= Deaths in August 2012 =

The following is a list of notable deaths in August 2012.

Entries for each day are listed alphabetically by surname. A typical entry lists information in the following sequence:

- Name, age, country of citizenship and reason for notability, established cause of death, reference (and language of reference, if not English).

== August 2012 ==
=== 1 ===
- Ülkü Adatepe, 79, Turkish adoptee, adopted daughter of Mustafa Kemal Atatürk, traffic collision.
- Shehzad Ahmed, 80, Pakistani Urdu poet.
- Archie Baxter, 90, Australian footballer.
- Joan Bernard, 94, British academic, first Principal of Trevelyan College, Durham.
- Dorothy D'Anna, 94, American actress.
- Sami Damian, 82, Romanian-born Jewish literary critic and essayist.
- Don Erickson, 80, American baseball player (Philadelphia Phillies).
- David Eyton-Jones, 88, British Army officer.
- Liselotte Funcke, 94, German politician.
- Aldo Maldera, 58, Italian footballer (AC Milan).
- Riccardo Ruotolo, 83, Italian Roman Catholic prelate, Auxiliary Bishop of Manfredonia-Vieste-San Giovanni Rotondo (1995–2004).
- Abel Salinas, 82, Peruvian politician.
- Douglas Townsend, 90, American composer and musicologist.
- Barry Trapnell, 88, English cricketer and headmaster.
- Keiko Tsushima, 86, Japanese actress (Seven Samurai), stomach cancer.
- Gustavo Vassallo, 92, Argentine fencer.

=== 2 ===
- Thor Axelsson, 91, Finnish sprint canoer.
- Alistair Bell, 82, British judge and politician.
- Jacques Caufrier, 70, Belgian Olympic water polo player (1960 and 1964).
- Ruy de Freitas, 95, Brazilian Olympic bronze medal-winning (1948) basketball player, multiple organ failure.
- Felix De Smedt, 88, Belgian pioneer judo teacher.
- Amos Hakham, 91, Israeli Bible scholar, first winner of the International Bible Contest (1958).
- Sir Gabriel Horn, 85, British biologist.
- Magnus Isacsson, 64, Canadian documentary filmmaker (Maxime, McDuff & McDo), cancer.
- Jimmy Jones, 82, American pop singer ("Handy Man", "Good Timin'").
- Sir John Keegan, 78, British military historian and journalist.
- Giovanni Lucchi, 69, Italian bow maker.
- Jacques Marty, 72, French Olympic boxer.
- Bernd Meier, 40, German footballer, heart attack.
- Jean Merrill, 89, American children's author (The Pushcart War), cancer.
- Marguerite Piazza, 90, American singer, heart failure.
- Cesare Pinarello, 79, Italian Olympic dual bronze medallist racing cyclist (1952, 1956).
- Gilbert Prouteau, 95, French poet and film director.
- William Smith, 4th Viscount Hambleden, 82, British peer, cancer.
- Jacques-Raymond Tremblay, 88, Canadian politician.
- Mihaela Ursuleasa, 33, Romanian pianist, cerebral hemorrhage.
- Herman van Ham, 81, Dutch head chef.

=== 3 ===
- Jan Muhammad Baloch, 60, Pakistani Olympic boxer.
- John Berry, 67, English speedway promoter (Ipswich Witches) and national team manager.
- Garth Burkett, 85, Australian football player.
- Fernando Cavaleiro, 95, Portuguese Olympic equestrian.
- Chang Do-yong, 89, South Korean general, politician and professor, dementia.
- Al Conway, 82, American football player and official.
- Frank Evans, 90, American Negro league baseball player.
- Martin Fleischmann, 85, Czech-born British chemist, complications of Parkinson's disease.
- Giorgi Gomiashvili, 39, Georgian business executive and diplomat, suicide by gunshot.
- Paul McCracken, 96, American economist, Chairman of the Council of Economic Advisers (1969–1971).
- John Pritchard, 85, American basketball player.
- George Shanard, 86, American politician and agribusinessman.

=== 4 ===
- István Andrássy, 85, Hungarian nematologist.
- Johnnie Bassett, 76, American blues musician, cancer.
- Josy Braun, 74, Luxembourgish writer, journalist and translator.
- Abdul Matin Chowdhury, 78, Bangladeshi politician, old age complications.
- Giuseppe Coco, 76, Italian comics artist and illustrator.
- Brian Crozier, 94, British author and journalist.
- Metin Erksan, 83, Turkish film director, renal failure.
- Hanley Funderburk, 81, American academic administrator, President of Auburn University (1980–1983).
- Con Houlihan, 86, Irish sports journalist.
- John J. Phelan Jr., 81, American financier and chief executive (New York Stock Exchange).
- Bud Riley, 86, American CFL coach (Winnipeg Blue Bombers, Hamilton Tiger-cats).
- Arnie Risen, 87, American Hall of Fame basketball player (Boston Celtics, Rochester Royals), complications from chronic obstructive pulmonary disease (COPD) and lung cancer.
- Henry Scholberg, 91, American bibliographer.
- Jimmy Thomson, 75, Scottish footballer (Dunfermline Athletic).

=== 5 ===
- Erwin Axer, 95, Polish theatre director.
- Michel Daerden, 62, Belgian politician, heart attack.
- Benjamin W. Heineman, 98, American railroad executive.
- Fred Matua, 28, American football player, heart failure.
- Martin E. Segal, 96, Russian-born American entrepreneur (Film Society of Lincoln Center).
- Sister Boom Boom, 57, American gay rights activist, member of the Sisters of Perpetual Indulgence, liver cancer.
- Kirk Urso, 22, American soccer player, heart failure.
- Chavela Vargas, 93, Costa Rican-born Mexican singer-songwriter, respiratory arrest.
- Roland Charles Wagner, 51, French author, traffic collision.
- Péter Zwack, 85, Hungarian businessman, philanthropist, diplomat and U.S. ambassador.
- Manie van Zyl, 83, South African Olympic wrestler.

=== 6 ===
- Míne Bean Uí Chribín, 84, Irish conservative campaigner.
- Celso Blues Boy, 56, Brazilian singer and guitarist, laryngeal cancer.
- Valentin Chernykh, 77, Russian screenwriter.
- Douglas Alan Clark, 95, American pilot.
- Richard Cragun, 67, American ballet dancer, heart attack.
- Marvin Hamlisch, 68, American composer and arranger (The Way We Were, A Chorus Line, The Sting), EGOT winner, lung failure.
- Robert Hughes, 74, Australian art critic and writer (The Fatal Shore).
- Gerry Kearby, 65, American businessman, traffic collision.
- Sir Bernard Lovell, 98, British astronomer.
- Mark O'Donnell, 58, American playwright (Hairspray, Cry-Baby) and author, respiratory arrest.
- Boris Razinsky, 79, Russian football player.
- Ruggiero Ricci, 94, American violinist, heart failure.
- Dan Roundfield, 59, American basketball player (Atlanta Hawks), drowning.
- Shunpei Ueyama, 91, Japanese philosopher.
- Frits Vandenboer, 78, Belgian footballer.
- Eleftherios Veryvakis, 77, Greek politician.
- Gregor W. Yeates, 68, New Zealand soil zoologist and ecologist.

=== 7 ===
- Murtuz Alasgarov, 83, Azerbaijani politician, Speaker of the National Assembly (1996–2005).
- Fritzi Jane Courtney, 89, American actress.
- George Crawford, 86, Australian politician, member of the Victorian Legislative Council for Jika Jika (1985–1992).
- Judith Crist, 90, American film critic.
- Luc de Heusch, 85, Belgian filmmaker and academic.
- Sabahattin Kalender, 93, Turkish composer.
- Vladimir Kobzev, 52, Russian football player and coach, stroke.
- Donald C. Paup, 73, American badminton player and academic.
- Anna Piaggi, 81, Italian fashion writer.
- Ranking Trevor, 60, Jamaican reggae musician, traffic collision.
- Veljko Rogošić, 71, Croatian Olympic long-distance swimmer.
- Hans Hammond Rossbach, 80, Norwegian politician.
- Samala Sadasiva, 84, Indian writer.
- Sir John Joseph Swaine, 80, Hong Kong politician and barrister, President of the Legislative Council (1993–1995).
- Marvin Lee Wilson, 54, American convicted murderer, execution by lethal injection.
- Mayer Zald, 81, American sociologist.
- Dušan Zbavitel, 87, Czech Indologist.

=== 8 ===
- Fay Ajzenberg-Selove, 86, German-born American physicist.
- Japie Basson, 94, South African politician.
- Hans Camenzind, 78, Swiss electronics engineer.
- Aung Shwe Prue Chowdhury, 98, Bangladeshi politician.
- Lou Costello, 76, English footballer.
- András Domahidy, 92, Hungarian-Australian novelist and librarian.
- Ruth Etchells, 81, English poet and college principal.
- Sancho Gracia, 75, Spanish actor, lung cancer.
- Azizul Haque, 93, Bangladeshi Islamic scholar and politician.
- Georgios Katsifaras, 77, Greek politician.
- Surya Lesmana, 68, Indonesian football player and manager, heart attack.
- Kurt Maetzig, 101, German film director.

=== 9 ===
- José Aruego, 80, Filipino children's book author and illustrator.
- Harry G. Barnes Jr., 86, American diplomat.
- Ralph W. Beiting, 88, American priest.
- Max Bound, 87, Australian environmental activist and trade unionist.
- Gerard J. Campbell, 92, American Jesuit and academic, President of Georgetown University (1964–1968).
- Carnegie, 21, British-bred French-trained Thoroughbred racehorse, winner of the Prix de l'Arc de Triomphe (1994), euthanized (death announced on this date).
- Paule Castaing, 101, French chef.
- Ananda Dassanayake, 92, Sri Lankan politician.
- Carl Davis, 77, American record producer ("Duke of Earl", "(Your Love Keeps Lifting Me) Higher and Higher"), lung disease.
- Tom Dockrell, 88, American ice hockey player and coach.
- Pyotr Fomenko, 80, Soviet and Russian film and theater director, teacher, and artistic director.
- Gene F. Franklin, 85, American control theorist, professor emeritus of electrical engineering (Stanford University).
- Al Freeman Jr., 78, American actor (Malcolm X, My Sweet Charlie, One Life to Live) and professor.
- Dale Olson, 78, American publicist, cancer.
- David Rakoff, 47, Canadian-born American writer and actor (Capote, Strangers with Candy), cancer.
- Hjalte Rasmussen, 71, Danish academic.
- Carmen Belén Richardson, 81, Puerto Rican actress and comedian.
- Jan Sawka, 65, Polish-born American artist and architect, heart attack.
- Mel Stuart, 83, American film director (If It's Tuesday, This Must Be Belgium; Willy Wonka & the Chocolate Factory), cancer.
- Erol Togay, 62, Turkish footballer.

=== 10 ===
- James Lloyd Abbot Jr., 94, American U.S. Navy rear admiral.
- Umar Sulaiman Al-Ashqar, 72, Jordanian academic.
- Altay Sarsenuly Amanzholov, 78, Kazakh Turkologist.
- Art Andrew, 81, United States Virgin Islands Olympic sailor.
- William G. Bade, 88, American mathematician.
- Robert C. Becklin, 86, American businessman and politician.
- Billy Bootle, 86, English footballer.
- Philippe Bugalski, 49, French rally driver, injuries from fall.
- Suresh Dalal, 79, Indian poet and writer in Gujarati language, heart attack.
- Amjad Hameed Khan Dasti, 94, Pakistani politician.
- Ioan Dicezare, 95, Romanian WWII fighter pilot ace.
- Joe Douse, 82, American Negro League baseball player.
- Irving Fein, 101, American film and television producer, manager of Jack Benny and George Burns.
- Madeleine Leininger, 87, American nursing theorist.
- William W. Momyer, 95, American air force general, heart ailment.
- Carlo Rambaldi, 86, Italian special effects artist (Alien, Close Encounters of the Third Kind, E.T. the Extra-Terrestrial), Oscar winner (1976, 1980, 1983).

=== 11 ===
- Red Bastien, 81, American professional wrestler, Alzheimer's disease.
- Carlo Curley, 59, American classical organist.
- Michael Dokes, 54, American former WBA heavyweight champion boxer, liver cancer.
- Marco Antonio Dorantes García, 76, Mexican football referee.
- Beverly Milton Dyck, 78, Canadian politician, progressive supranuclear palsy.
- Hans Einstein, 89, American physician.
- Karl Fleming, 84, American journalist, respiratory complications.
- Birgit Fogh-Andersen, 89, Danish politician.
- Von Freeman, 88, American hard bop jazz tenor saxophonist, heart failure.
- Lucy Gallardo, 82, Argentine-born Mexican film and telenovela actress (How the Garcia Girls Spent Their Summer), chronic obstructive pulmonary disease.
- Hilary Gardner, 90, South African cricketer.
- Heidi Holland, 64, Zimbabwean journalist and author, apparent suicide by hanging.
- Shafaat Jamil, 72, Bangladesh Army officer.
- Bhadriraju Krishnamurti, 84, Indian linguist.
- R. Duncan Luce, 87, American cognitive scientist.
- Henning Moritzen, 84, Danish actor, heart attack.
- Dame Simone Prendergast, 82, British public servant and philanthropist.
- Bill Rafferty, 68, American comedian and television host (Blockbusters, Card Sharks, Real People), heart failure.
- Stuart Randall, Baron Randall of St Budeaux, 74, British politician, MP for Kingston upon Hull West (1983–1997).
- Roger Sandall, 79, New Zealand anthropologist and writer.
- Sid Waddell, 72, British darts commentator and author, bowel cancer.
- Susan Weiner, 66, American politician, Mayor of Savannah (1992–1996), complications from surgery.

=== 12 ===
- Eileen Beasley, 91, Welsh teacher and Welsh language campaigner, pancreatic cancer.
- Ève Cournoyer, 43, Canadian singer-songwriter.
- Prabuddha Dasgupta, 55, Indian fashion photographer, heart attack.
- Alex Falconer, 72, Scottish politician, MEP for Mid Scotland and Fife (1984–1999).
- Pedro Gasset, 88, Spanish Olympic field hockey player.
- Jerry Grant, 77, American race car driver, liver failure and diabetes.
- Dominic Hibberd, 71, English biographer, pneumonia-induced corticobasal degeneration.
- Barbara Kimenye, 82, British-born Ugandan children's author.
- Joe Kubert, 85, Polish-born American comic book artist (Sgt. Rock, Hawkman), multiple myeloma.
- Jakov Labura, 74, Croatian Olympic rower.
- Frank Martin, 73, American defense attorney and politician, Mayor of Columbus, Georgia (1991–1994), pancreatic cancer.
- Robert W. McNitt, 97, American U.S. Navy rear admiral, dean of admissions at the U.S. Naval Academy, heart failure.
- Édgar Morales Pérez, Mexican politician, mayor-elect of Matehuala, shooting.
- Alf Morris, Baron Morris, 84, British politician and disability rights campaigner, MP for Manchester Wythenshawe (1964–1997).
- Jackie Watters, 92, Scottish footballer (Celtic).

=== 13 ===
- Hugo Bedau, 85, American philosopher, complications from Parkinson's disease.
- Beverly Bender, 94, American sculptor.
- Helen Gurley Brown, 90, American author, publisher, and businesswoman; editor-in-chief of Cosmopolitan magazine (1965–1997).
- Robert Bruce, 96, Scottish composer.
- Jimmy Carr, 79, American football player (Philadelphia Eagles).
- Dan Daniels, 90, American sportscaster.
- Salvador Escudero, 69, Filipino politician, cancer.
- E. X. Giroux, 88, U.S.-born Canadian writer.
- Kathi Goertzen, 54, American journalist and television anchor (KOMO-TV), benign brain tumors.
- Nellie Gray, 88, American anti-abortion activist and lawyer, natural causes. (body discovered on this date)
- Ray Jordon, 75, Australian cricketer and football coach, cancer.
- Deborah Scaling Kiley, 54, American shipwreck survivor, sailor, author, motivational speaker and businesswoman.
- Hervé Le Cléac'h, 97, French Roman Catholic prelate, Bishop of Taiohae o Tefenuaenata (1973–1986).
- W. Michael Mathes, 76, American historian, expert on the history of Baja California.
- Johnny Munkhammar, 37, Swedish politician, MP (2010–2012) and writer, adenoid cystic carcinoma.
- Johnny Pesky, 93, American baseball player, manager, and coach (Boston Red Sox).
- Joan Roberts, 95, American musical theatre actress (Oklahoma!), heart failure.
- Typhoon Tracy, 6, Australian Thoroughbred racehorse, winner of the Coolmore Classic (2009) and Futurity Stakes (2010).

=== 14 ===
- Agitay Adilov, 71, Uzbek politician.
- Maja Bošković-Stulli, 89, Croatian historian, writer, publisher and academic.
- Remy Charlip, 83, American dancer.
- Colorspin, 29, French-bred, British-trained Thoroughbred racehorse and broodmare, suspected heart attack.
- Vilasrao Deshmukh, 67, Indian politician, kidney and liver failure.
- Svetozar Gligorić, 89, Serbian chess grandmaster, stroke.
- Brian Green, 77, British football coach and player.
- Svein Hansen, 69, Norwegian ice hockey player.
- Sergey Kapitsa, 84, Russian physicist, demographer, and television host; son of Pyotr Kapitsa.
- Billy Kerr, 67, Irish Olympic cyclist.
- Marilyn Leavitt-Imblum, 66, American embroidery designer.
- Charles Maynard, 42, Bahamian politician, chairman of the opposition Free National Movement (since 2012), apparent heart attack.
- Anna Orso, 73, Italian actress.
- Ron Palillo, 63, American actor (Welcome Back, Kotter, Rubik, the Amazing Cube, Friday the 13th Part VI: Jason Lives), heart attack.
- Al Rabin, 76, American producer and director (Days of Our Lives).
- Rosemary Rice, 87, American radio and television actress (Archie Andrews, Mama).
- Juliette Slaughter, British racing driver, 66, cancer.
- Smoke, American donkey, therapy animal for the United States Marine Corps.
- Phyllis Thaxter, 92, American actress (Superman, Thirty Seconds Over Tokyo, The World of Henry Orient), complications from Alzheimer's disease.
- Zhou Kehua, 42, Chinese criminal, shooting.

=== 15 ===
- Elson Iazegi Beyruth, 70, Brazilian footballer, complications of diabetes.
- Bob Birch, 56, American musician (Elton John), apparent suicide by gunshot.
- Jeffery Boswall, 81, British naturalist and broadcaster, cancer.
- Richard B. Brewer, 61, American chief executive officer (Myrexis), cancer.
- Altamiro Carrilho, 87, Brazilian musician and composer, lung cancer.
- Enzo Cavazzoni, 80, Italian Olympic water polo player.
- Biff Elliot, 89, American actor (Alfred Hitchcock Presents, I, the Jury, The Enemy Below).
- Joaquín Filba, 89, Spanish cyclist.
- Punch Gunalan, 68, Malaysian badminton player, liver cancer.
- Harry Harrison, 87, American science fiction writer (Make Room! Make Room!, The Stainless Steel Rat).
- Henry Herx, 79, American film critic, complications from liver cancer.
- Ralph Holman, 94, American biochemist.
- Matthew Ianniello, 92, American mobster, member of the Genovese crime family.
- Elisabeth von Janota-Bzowski, 99, German graphic artist and postage stamp designer.
- Müşfik Kenter, 79, Turkish theater actor, lung cancer.
- Colleen B. Lemmon, 85, American Latter Day Saint counselor.
- Ashok Mehta, 65, Indian cinematographer (Bandit Queen), lung cancer.
- Carina Moberg, 46, Swedish politician, MP for Stockholm County (1994–2012), cancer.
- Albert (Peto) Nicholas, 61, Cook Islands politician, heart attack.
- Burl Osborne, 75, American publisher, chairman of the Associated Press (2002–2007), after short illness.
- Mitchell Todd, 21, British rugby player (Nottingham), traffic collision.
- Sir Ray Whitney, 81, British politician, MP for Wycombe (1978–2001).
- Heinz Wittig, 74, German Olympic water polo player.
- Arbën Xhaferi, 64, Macedonian politician and Albanian-rights activist, complications from a stroke.

=== 16 ===
- Peter Joseph Bis, app. 61, American homeless man, heart attack.
- Larry R. Brown, 69, American politician, member of the North Carolina House of Representatives (since 2005), heart attack.
- Dominique Chevalier, 56, French footballer.
- Candice Cohen-Ahnine, app. 35, French-born former Saudi royal, fall from apartment window.
- T. G. Kamala Devi, 81, Indian actor and playback singer.
- Evon Dickson, 77, New Zealand cricketer.
- Akiva Ehrenfeld, 90, Austrian-born Israeli Orthodox Jewish rabbi.
- Martine Franck, 74, Belgian photographer, bone marrow cancer.
- Owsley Brown Frazier, 77, American philanthropist.
- Jang Hyun-kyu, 30, South Korean footballer, suspected heart attack.
- Phil Kelly, 73, Irish footballer.
- William Kent, 93, American artist.
- Constance Kgosiemang, 66, Namibian politician, paramount chief of the Tswana people, heart attack.
- Princess Lalla Amina of Morocco, 58, Moroccan royal, daughter of Mohammed V of Morocco, lung cancer.
- Marvin Meyer, 64, American biblical scholar, cancer.
- Abune Paulos, 76, Ethiopian patriarch of the Ethiopian Orthodox Tewahedo Church, heart attack.
- Bystrík Režucha, 77, Slovak conductor.
- William Windom, 88, American actor (Murder She Wrote, To Kill a Mockingbird, Star Trek), heart failure.
- Katsumi Yamauchi, 100, Japanese politician, mayor of Iwata, Shizuoka, natural causes.

=== 17 ===
- Joan Bielski, 88, Australian activist.
- Aase Bjerkholt, 97, Norwegian politician and government minister, Minister of Family and Consumer Affairs (1956–1963, 1963–1965).
- Pál Bogár, 84, Hungarian Olympic basketball player.
- Amparo Cuevas, 81, Spanish Roman Catholic seer.
- Axel Edelstam, 88, Swedish diplomat.
- Joey Kovar, 29, American reality TV star (The Real World: Hollywood, Celebrity Rehab with Dr. Drew), opiate intoxication.
- Geoffrey Lees, 92, English cricketer and educator, prolonged illness.
- John Lynch-Staunton, 82, Canadian politician, Senator (1990–2005), leader of the Conservative Party (2003–2004), heart attack.
- Willem G. van Maanen, 91, Dutch journalist and writer.
- Panos Markovic, 87, Greek football coach and player.
- Lou Martin, 63, Northern Irish musician (Rory Gallagher).
- Brian Oakley, 84, British civil servant and scientist.
- Shirley W. Palmer-Ball, 82, American businessman and politician.
- Veronique Peck, 80, French-born American arts patron.
- Victor Poor, 79, American engineer, co-developer of the microchip and various radio developments, cancer.
- Patrick Ricard, 67, French entrepreneur (Pernod Ricard), complications from a heart attack.

=== 18 ===
- Samuel Anderson, 82, Cuban Olympic hurdler.
- Hisham al-Hayali, Iraqi politician, Governor of Diyala Governorate (2012), traffic collision.
- Tayseer al-Mashhadani, Iraqi engineer and politician, traffic collision.
- Alan Bateman, 76, Australian film producer and television screenwriter, cancer.
- Harrison Begay, 94, American painter.
- George Bowers, 68, American film editor (A League of Their Own, The Country Bears, Harlem Nights), complications following heart surgery.
- Lourival Mendes França, Brazilian draughts player.
- Robert B. Gaither, 83, American mechanical engineer.
- Les Kaine, 76, Australian footballer (Hawthorn).
- John Kovatch, 92, American football player (Washington Redskins).
- Scott McKenzie, 73, American singer ("San Francisco (Be Sure to Wear Flowers in Your Hair)") and songwriter ("Kokomo"), Guillain–Barré syndrome.
- Ra. Ki. Rangarajan, 85, Indian Tamil language writer.
- Jesse Robredo, 54, Filipino politician, Mayor of Naga City (1988–1998, 2001–2010), Secretary of the Interior and Local Government (since 2010), plane crash.
- Eilif Straume, 83, Norwegian writer and critic.

=== 19 ===
- Ghazi al-Sadiq, Sudanese politician, Minister of Guidance and Religious Endowments, plane crash.
- Yuriy Avanesov, 77, Soviet football player and coach.
- Doug Dench, 82, Australian football player.
- Hellmut Geissner, 86, German scholar.
- Donal Henahan, 91, American music critic.
- Ivar Iversen, 97, Norwegian Olympic sprint canoeist.
- Laura Latini, 42, Italian voice actress, cancer.
- Maïté Nahyr, 64, South African-born Belgian actress.
- Samia Yusuf Omar, 21, Somali Olympic runner, drowning. (death announced on this date)
- Tony Scott, 68, British film director (Top Gun, True Romance, Man on Fire) and producer, suicide by jumping.
- Edmund Skellings, 80, American poet.

=== 20 ===
- Agnes World, 17, American-bred, Japanese-trained Thoroughbred racehorse and sire.
- Seweryn Chajtman, 93, Polish scientist.
- Lucy Dickenson, 32, Welsh charity worker, road accident.
- Phyllis Diller, 95, American comedian and actress (The Pruitts of Southampton, Splendor in the Grass, A Bug's Life).
- Virginia Dwyer, 92, American actress (Another World, As the World Turns, Guiding Light).
- Juan Edmunds Rapahango, 89, Chilean Rapa Nui politician.
- Daryl Hine, 76, American poet, editor, and translator, intestinal blockage.
- Jacob Matijevic, 64, American engineer (NASA).
- Dom Mintoff, 96, Maltese politician, Prime Minister (1955–1958, 1971–1984), natural causes.
- Len Quested, 87, English footballer.
- Kapu Rajaiah, 87, Indian painter, complication of Parkinson's disease.
- Alexander Saxton, 93, American novelist and historian.
- Mika Yamamoto, 45, Japanese journalist, shooting.
- Meles Zenawi, 57, Ethiopian politician, President (1991–1995), Prime Minister (since 1995), liver cancer.

=== 21 ===
- Flavio Ambrosetti, 92, Swiss saxophonist and engineer.
- Vinus van Baalen, 70, Dutch Olympic swimmer.
- Paul Bassim, 89, Lebanese Roman Catholic prelate, Vicar Apostolic of Beirut (1974–1999).
- Joe Cunningham, 80–81, Northern Irish Gaelic footballer.
- Tissa David, 91, Hungarian-born American animator (Raggedy Ann & Andy: A Musical Adventure), cancer.
- John Davidson, 87, American politician, member of the Illinois Senate (1973–1993), natural causes.
- Genoveva Dawson, 94, Argentine botanist, curator, teacher, and explorer.
- Hans Josephsohn, 92, Swiss sculptor.
- Delcia Kite, 88, Australian politician, member of the New South Wales Legislative Council (1976–1995).
- Kyle Larsen, 62, American contract bridge player.
- Georg Leber, 91, German politician, Minister of Defence (1972–1978).
- Shimon Lev-Ari, 70, Israeli actor, theatre director and translator.
- Gary Mara, 50, Australian rugby league player (Balmain Tigers), traffic collision.
- Taketoshi Naito, 86, Japanese actor.
- Don Raleigh, 86, Canadian ice hockey player (New York Rangers), complications of a fall.
- J. Frank Raley Jr., 85, American politician, member of the Maryland Senate (1963–1966), heart attack.
- Roy Speer, 80, American businessman (Home Shopping Network).
- Guy Spitaels, 80, Belgian politician, Leader of the Socialist Party (1981–1992), Minister-President of Wallonia (1992–1994), brain tumor.
- William Thurston, 65, American mathematician, melanoma.
- Sergio Toppi, 79, Italian cartoonist, cancer.
- Ivan the Gorilla, 49–50, gorilla who didn't see his kind for 27 years, chest tumor.

=== 22 ===
- Houcine Anafal, 59, Moroccan footballer, heart attack.
- Bernie Anderson, 71, Australian footballer.
- Nina Bawden, 87, British author (Carrie's War).
- Larry Carp, 86, American attorney and diplomat.
- Rudy Challenger, 83, American supporting actor.
- David K. Cheng, 94, Chinese-born American professor.
- Charles Flores, 41, Cuban-born American jazz bassist, throat cancer.
- José Foralosso, 74, Italian-born Brazilian Roman Catholic prelate, Bishop of Marabá (2000–2012), complications from a stroke.
- Trevor French, Australian Paralympic swimmer.
- Guy Landry Hazoumé, 72, Beninese politician and poet.
- Paulino Matip Nhial, 69–70, South Sudanese military leader and politician, complications of diabetes.
- Paul Shan Kuo-hsi, 88, Taiwanese Roman Catholic cardinal, Bishop of Kaohsiung (1991–2006), pneumonia.
- Martin Shikuku, 79, Kenyan politician, MP for Butere (1963–1975, 1979–1988, 1992–1997), cancer.
- Jeffrey Stone, 85, American actor, model for Prince Charming in Cinderella.
- András Szennay, 91, Hungarian Roman Catholic prelate, Abbot of the Pannonhalma Archabbey (1973–1991).

=== 23 ===
- Col Campbell, 78, Australian gardener, cancer.
- Paul Ch'eng Shih-kuang, 96, Taiwanese Roman Catholic prelate, Bishop of Tainan (1966–1990).
- Jean-Luc Delarue, 48, French television producer and host, stomach cancer.
- Aubrey Dunn Sr., 84, American politician, member of the New Mexico Senate (1965–1980), cancer.
- James Fogle, 75, American author (Drugstore Cowboy), mesothelioma.
- Byard Lancaster, 70, American jazz multi-instrumentalist, pancreatic cancer.
- Howard Lee, 77, Bermudian Olympic sailor.
- Edith Mastenbroek, 37, Dutch politician, Member of the European Parliament (2004–2008), cardiac arrest.
- Bob Myrick, 59, American baseball player (New York Mets), heart attack.
- Merv Neagle, 54, Australian AFL football player (Essendon), traffic collision.
- Jerry Nelson, 78, American puppeteer (The Muppet Show, Sesame Street, Fraggle Rock), prostate cancer and COPD.
- James Serrin, 85, American mathematician.
- Josepha Sherman, 65, American science fiction author.
- Steve Van Buren, 91, American Hall of Fame football player (Philadelphia Eagles), pneumonia.

=== 24 ===
- Henry H. Black, 83, American marine.
- Werner Braun, 86, German musicologist.
- Cornelia Brierly, 99, American architect.
- Jan Bureš, 86, Czech neurophysiologist, Alzheimer's disease.
- Bud Chamberlain, 92, American baseball player and realtor.
- Dadullah, app. 47, Pakistani Taliban leader (Bajaur Agency), airstrike.
- Richard William Davis, 70, American child murderer and rapist, natural causes.
- Aleksander Donner, 65, Ukrainian handball coach.
- Lijon Eknilang, 66, Marshallese anti–nuclear weapons activist. (death reported on this date)
- Pauli Ellefsen, 76, Faroese politician, Prime Minister (1981–1985).
- Sir Richard Evans, 84, British diplomat, Ambassador to the People's Republic of China (1984–1988).
- Félix Miélli Venerando, 74, Brazilian footballer, 1970 FIFA World Cup winner, cardiac arrest.
- Steve Franken, 80, American actor (Bewitched, The Many Loves of Dobie Gillis), cancer.
- Bud Goodall, 59, American scholar and writer, pancreatic cancer.
- Gerd Greune, 63, German politician.
- Zygmunt Kiszkurno, 91, Polish Olympic sport shooter.
- Claire Malis, 69, American actress (One Life to Live, From Here to Eternity, The Facts of Life), heart failure and pneumonia.
- Dale Sommers, 68, American radio personality, Addison's disease.
- Maureen Toal, 82, Irish actress.
- Krum Yanev, 83, Bulgarian Olympic footballer.

=== 25 ===
- Florencio Amarilla, 77, Paraguayan footballer, coach and actor.
- Neil Armstrong, 82, American astronaut, first person to walk on the Moon, complications from surgery.
- R. Palmer Beasley, 76, American physician, public health educator, and epidemiologist, pancreatic cancer.
- Ray Booty, 79, English cyclist, British Empire and Commonwealth Games gold medallist (1958), cancer.
- Stephen Bradford, 48, English cricket player (Lincolnshire).
- Willard C. Butcher, 85, American banker, cancer.
- Joshua Casteel, 32, American soldier and playwright, lung cancer.
- Stanley Crooks, 70, American tribal leader, Chairman of the Shakopee Mdewakanton Sioux Community (1992–2012), respiratory ailment.
- Wisse Dekker, 88, Dutch businessman, traffic collision.
- Georg Feuerstein, 65, German-born Canadian scholar of Hinduism.
- Roger Fisher, 90, American academic.
- Vesna Girardi-Jurkić, 68, Croatian archeologist and museologist.
- Roberto González Barrera, 82, Mexican businessman, founder of Gruma, cancer.
- Donald Gorrie, 79, Scottish politician, MSP for Central Scotland (1999–2007), MP for Edinburgh West (1997–2001).
- Aurélio Granada Escudeiro, 92, Portuguese Roman Catholic prelate, Bishop of Angra (1979–1996), pneumonia.
- Angkarn Kalayanapong, 86, Thai poet and artist, heart disease and diabetes.
- Eduardo Koaik, 86, Brazilian Roman Catholic prelate, Bishop of Piracicaba (1984–2002), cancer.
- V. K. Lakshmanan, 80, Indian politician, MP for Coimbatore East (1991–2006).
- Richard Norris, 80, British Olympic bronze medallist field hockey player (1952).
- Emilio Pacione, 92, Scottish footballer (Dundee United).
- Manola Saavedra, 76, Spanish-born Mexican actress.
- Pontus Schultz, 40, Swedish journalist, ravine fall during 2012 Haute Route bicycle race.
- Juan Valdez, 74, American land rights activist.

=== 26 ===
- Russ Alben, 82, American advertising executive.
- Reginald Bartholomew, 76, American diplomat, cancer.
- Jacques Bensimon, 69, Canadian film executive, cancer.
- Gérard Bitsindou, 70, Congolese politician.
- Viredo Espinosa, 83, Cuban artist, vascular disease.
- Robert T. Gannett, 94, American politician and lawyer.
- John Goldkamp, 64, American criminologist, multiple myeloma.
- George Gunther, 92, American politician.
- A. K. Hangal, 98, Indian actor, complications from a fall.
- Countess Alix de Lannoy, 70, Belgian countess, mother of Stéphanie de Lannoy, stroke.
- Peter L. Shelton, 67, American architect, cancer.
- Karsten Anker Solhaug, 97, Norwegian salvationist.
- Alan Steen, 90, English footballer (Wolverhampton Wanderers).
- Krzysztof Wilmanski, 72, Polish physicist, pancreatic cancer.

=== 27 ===
- Sonja Albrink, 64, Danish politician, member of the Folketing (1984–2001).
- Neville Alexander, 75, South African revolutionary and linguist, cancer.
- Aurora Bautista, 86, Spanish film actress.
- Malcolm Browne, 81, American journalist and photographer (1964 Pulitzer Prize), complications of Parkinson's disease.
- Irwin Cohen, 60, American judoka, amyloidosis and myelodysplastic syndromes.
- Tony Dumper, 88, British Anglican prelate, Bishop of Dudley (1977–1993).
- Richard L. Fisher, 64, American politician and energy executive, heart attack.
- Art Heyman, 71, American basketball player (New York Knicks, Philadelphia 76ers).
- Allan Horsfall, 84, British gay rights activist.
- Ivica Horvat, 86, Croatian football player and manager.
- Richard Keyes, 81, American painter.
- Sir Richard Kingsland, 95, Australian RAAF pilot and public servant.
- Geliy Korzhev, 87, Russian painter.
- Karl Lennert, 91, German physician and pathologist.
- Leonard Linsky, 90, American philosopher.
- Louis Ncamiso Ndlovu, 67, Swazi Roman Catholic prelate, Bishop of Manzini (1985–2012), heart failure.
- Antoine Redin, 77, French footballer and football manager.
- Aboud Rogo, 44, Kenyan Islamic cleric, shooting.
- Russell Scott, 91, American clown and television host (Blinky's Fun Club), pneumonia.
- Tomáš Sedláček, 94, Czech general, anti-Nazi resistance member, and political prisoner, melanoma.
- Tao Wei, 46, Chinese football player and commentator, heart attack.
- Roger J. White, 71, British-born American Episcopal prelate, Bishop of Milwaukee (1985–2003), brain aneurysm.
- Albert George Wilson, 94, American astronomer.

=== 28 ===
- Akhlakul Hossain Ahmed, 85, Bangladeshi physician and politician.
- Said Afandi al-Chirkawi, 74, Russian Muslim Sufi leader, suicide bomb attack.
- Sir Rhodes Boyson, 87, British educator, author and politician, MP for Brent North (1974–1997).
- Norm Dussault, 86, American ice hockey player (Montreal Canadiens).
- Maffeo Giovanni Ducoli, 93, Italian Roman Catholic prelate, Bishop of Belluno-Feltre (1975–1996).
- Eva Figes, 80, English author.
- Shulamith Firestone, 67, Canadian-born American feminist writer (The Dialectic of Sex).
- Dave Fredrickson, 85, American archaeologist, anthropologist, and folk singer.
- William Pascal Kikoti, 55, Tanzanian Roman Catholic prelate, Bishop of Mpanda (since 2000), complications of high blood pressure.
- Dick McBride, 84, American beat poet.
- Saul Merin, 79, Israeli ophthalmologist.
- K. Pankajakshan, 84, Indian politician, MLA in Kerala (1971–1977, 1980–1991), cardiac arrest.
- Alfred Schmidt, 81, German philosopher.
- Ramón Sota, 74, Spanish golfer, pneumonia.

=== 29 ===
- Said Aburish, 77, Palestinian journalist.
- Margie Foote, 82, American politician.
- Ruth Goldbloom, 88, Canadian philanthropist, co-founder of the Pier 21 museum, cancer.
- Nicholas Goodrick-Clarke, 59, British academic and author (The Occult Roots of Nazism), cancer.
- Shoshichi Kobayashi, 80, Japanese mathematician.
- Anne McKnight, 88, American opera singer.
- Les Moss, 87, American baseball player (St. Louis Browns).
- Daniel O'Keefe, 84, American author and editor (Reader's Digest), inventor of Festivus.
- Sergei Ovchinnikov, 43, Russian volleyball coach (women's national team), suspected suicide by hanging.
- Jeremy Pope, 76, New Zealand activist and lawyer.
- Donald E. Tewes, 96, American businessman and politician, Representative from Wisconsin (1957–1959).
- Valyra, 3, British-bred French-trained Thoroughbred racehorse, winner of the Prix de Diane (2012), euthanized.

=== 30 ===
- Tadeusz Skowroński, 48,Polish music composer,Birthplace,Bydgoszcz.
- Daire Brehan, 55, Irish broadcaster, actress and barrister, cancer.
- L. Macon Epps, 92, American engineer, inventor, author and poet.
- Gaeton Fonzi, 76, American investigative journalist, complications from Parkinson's disease.
- Kristian Fougner, 93, Norwegian engineer and resistance member.
- Paul Friedrichs, 72, German motocross racer.
- Bill Kini, 75, New Zealand boxer and rugby player, cancer.
- Igor Kvasha, 79, Russian actor.
- Carlos Larrañaga, 75, Spanish actor, cardiac decompensation.
- Chris Lighty, 44, American talent manager, co-founder of Violator Entertainment, suicide by gunshot.
- Nat Peeples, 86, American professional baseball player.
- Don Richard Riso, 66, American teacher and author, cancer.
- Jacek Sempoliński, 85, Polish painter, art professor, critic, and essayist.
- Anton Skulberg, 90, Norwegian scientist and politician, MP for Østfold (1969–1972, 1974–1977).
- Vidar Theisen, 79, Norwegian meteorologist and weather presenter, Parkinson's disease.
- Gabriel Vahanian, 85, French Christian theologian.
- Christopher Williams, 85, British Olympic bobsledder.
- Xin Kegui, 61, Chinese academic and civil engineer.

=== 31 ===
- Cornelis Christiaan Berg, 78, Dutch botanist.
- Max Bygraves, 89, British singer, variety performer, and TV game show host (Family Fortunes), complications from Alzheimer's disease.
- Lucas Luis Dónnelly, 91, Argentine Roman Catholic prelate.
- Mark J. Dworkin, 66, Canadian writer.
- Rajvinder Kaur Gill, 40, Canadian banker, strangulation.
- Tom Keating, 69, American football player (Oakland Raiders), prostate cancer.
- Alan M. Kriegsman, 84, American dance critic (1976 Pulitzer Prize for Criticism), heart disease.
- Kris Kin, 12, American-bred British-trained Thoroughbred racehorse, winner of The Derby (2003), cervical fracture. (death announced on this date)
- Joe Lewis, 68, American martial arts master, actor, brain tumor.
- Carlo Maria Martini, 85, Italian Roman Catholic prelate, Cardinal Archbishop of Milan (1979–2002), Parkinson's disease.
- Frank B. McDonald, 87, American astrophysicist.
- Pedro Medina Avendaño, 96, Colombian poet.
- Steven Smith Mijiga, 74, Malawian civil servant, Post Master General.
- Anthony Mathias Mundadan, 88, Indian priest.
- Kashiram Rana, 74, Indian politician, MLA for Surat East (1975–1980) and MP for Surat (1989–2009), heart attack.
- Heraldine Rock, 79, Saint Lucian educator and politician.
- John C. Shabaz, 81, American judge and politician, member of the Wisconsin State Assembly (1964–1979).
- Sergey Sokolov, 101, Soviet military commander, Marshal of the Soviet Union, Minister of Defense of the Soviet Union (1984–1987).
- Theatrical, 30, Irish-bred American Thoroughbred racehorse, winner of the Breeders' Cup Turf (1987), euthanized.
- Edward Vincent, 78, American politician, first African-American Mayor of Inglewood, California (1983–1996), member of the California State Assembly (1996–2000).
- Norbert Walter, 67, German economist.
- Mahmoud El-Gohary, 74, Egyptian football player and coach, complications of a stroke.
