= Xin Kegui =

Professor Chen Kegui (Chinese: 辛克贵; pinyin: Xīn Kègùi) (October 6, 1950 – August 30, 2012) was the head of department of civil engineering at Tsinghua University and deputy dean of School of Civil Engineering at Tsinghua University from 2005 until his death in 2012.

Xin was born October 6, 1950, in Sichuan Province, China. He began his college life when he was 23, but he made progress fast. He received his B.Sc. in 1977, M.Sc. in 1983 from Tsinghua University, supervised by professor Yu-qiu Long (a member of the Chinese Academy of Engineering). He later earned a Ph.D. from The Hong Kong Polytechnic University.

Xin served as deputy dean in School of Civil Engineering until his death. He was author and co-author of numerous scientific publications, an editor, and was on the editorial board of the Journal of Engineering Mechanics. He served on the editorial board of the Journal of Engineering Mechanics from 1997 and contributed to numerous professional activities in structural engineering.

== Education background ==
- 1973-1977 Dept. of Construction and Civil Engineering, Tsinghua University, B.Sc.
- 1979-1983 Dept. of Civil Engineering, Tsinghua University, M.Sc. (Advisor:Prof. Yuqiu Long)
- 1990-1994 Dept. of Structure and Civil Engineering, The Hong Kong Polytechnic University, Ph.D.

== Honors ==
- Liangshi Yiyou Graduate Mentor Awards, 2008
- Excellent Individual Faculty Awards, Tsinghua, 2003
- National Education First Awards. Chinese Gov't, 2002
- Outstanding Journal Paper Awards, 1986

== Research experience ==
- 1986.06–1990.06 Dept. of Civil Engineering, Tsinghua University, lecturer
- 1990.06–1994.12 Dept. of Structure and Civil Engineering, The Hong Kong Polytechnic University, lecturer, associate researcher
- 1995.08–2001.08 Dept. of Civil Engineering, Tsinghua University, associate professor
- 2001.08–current Dept. of Civil Engineering, Tsinghua University, professor, doctoral tutor
- 1992.04–2000.02 head, Dept. of Civil Engineering, Tsinghua University
- 2000.01–2003.06 director, Office of Construction of Heat & Electricity, Tsinghua University
- 2001.11–2002.01 associate dean, School of Civil Engineering, Tsinghua University
- 2003.06–present chair, deputy dean, School of Civil Engineering, Tsinghua University

== Publications ==
Monographs and textbooks:

- Structural Mechanics, 4th Edition, 2001
- Matrix Analysis and Programming, 1989

Research Articles:

- Yuqiu Long, Kegui Xin. Generalized conforming element for bending and buckling analysis of plates. Finite Elements in Analysis and Design, 1989, 5(1): 15-30. doi:10.1016/0168-874X(89)90003-6
- Minghua He, Kegui Xin. Separation work analysis of cohesive law and consistently coupled cohesive law, Applied Mathematics and Mechanics, 2011, 32(11): 1437-1446. doi:10.1007/s10483-011-1513-x
- Kegui Xin, Shihua Bao, W.Y. Li. A Semi-discrete method for analysis of tube-in-tube structures, Computers & Structures, 1994, 53(2): 319-325. doi:10.1016/0045-7949(94)90204-6
- W.Y. Li, Kegui Xin. Analysis of thin-walled members by complementary energy method using spline function, Thin-walled Structures, 1992, 14(4): 327-342. doi:10.1016/0263-8231(92)90039-Y
