= Larry Carp =

American lawyer

Richard Lawrence 'Larry' Carp (January 26, 1926 – August 22, 2012) was an attorney-at-law, senior partner in the Clayton, Missouri firm of Carp & Sexauer (formerly Carp & Morris). A long-time advocate for reform in Missouri Democratic politics, he was the Democratic nominee for Congress from the 2nd congressional district in 1960, losing to Republican incumbent Thomas B. Curtis in the general election; and a candidate for the Democratic nomination for Missouri State Treasurer in 1972, losing the primary election to Dr. James Spainhower, who was elected to the office in the general election. Carp later went on to head the Missouri chapter of Common Cause.

Carp gained a Bachelor of Arts from Washington University in St. Louis in 1947, and also studied at the Sorbonne. He earned a Master of Arts from the Graduate Institute of International Studies in 1949. Carp earned his J.D. from Washington University School of Law. While in law school he became a member of the Phi Delta Phi fraternity. Prior to going into private practice he worked for the United States Department of State and then was Associate Counsel for the Senate Judiciary Subcommittee on Constitutional Rights.

Carp held memberships in the Bar Association of Metropolitan St. Louis (former chairman, Immigration Law Committee; former vice chairman, Immigration and Nationality Committee); the St. Louis County Bar Association; the American Bar Association; the American Immigration Lawyers Association; and the Missouri Bar. He was a Fellow of the American Academy of Matrimonial Lawyers and was Treasurer of its Missouri Chapter.

Carp was also a former vice chairman and commissioner of the Missouri Commission on Human Rights; a former member of the Advisory Board of the George Engelmann Math and Science Institute; and former Legal Advisor to the St. Louis Chapter of Image, Inc. (An Hispanic Organization). During the final year of the Clinton Administration he was a Presidential Appointee as Senior Adviser and U. S. Public Delegate to the 55th session of the United Nations General Assembly.

Carp was on the Board of Trustees of the Academy of Science of St. Louis and the Board of directors of the St. Louis Center for International Relations, and was an Adviser to the Ethiopian Community Association of St. Louis.
