= Margie Foote =

American politician

Member of the Nevada Senate
- In office November 6, 1974 – November 8, 1978

Member of the Nevada Assembly
- In office November 9, 1966 – November 6, 1974

Personal details
- Born: December 23, 1929 Reno, Nevada
- Died: August 29, 2012 (aged 82) Sparks, Nevada
- Party: Democratic

Margie Foote (December 23, 1929 – August 29, 2012) was an American politician.

== Career ==
She served in the Nevada Assembly from 1966 to 1974 and in the Nevada Senate from 1974 to 1978.

== Death ==
She died on August 29, 2012, in Sparks, Nevada at age 82.
