= Juan Valdez (activist) =

Activist (1938-2012)

Juan Valdez (1938 – August 25, 2012) was an activist of Spanish and indigenous descent and an advocate for land-grant rights. He fired the first shot during a 1967 New Mexico courthouse raid that seized international attention and helped spark the Chicano Movement.

== Biography ==
Valdez was born in 1938 in Rio Arriba County, New Mexico. Heir to a northern New Mexico land grant, Valdez was 29 years old when he joined the group of land grant advocates Alianza Federal de Mercedes (Federal Land Grant Alliance) in raiding a Rio Arriba County courthouse in Tierra Amarilla. Their goal was to attempt a citizen's arrest of then-District Attorney Alfonso Sanchez over Hispanic land rights issues. "Tijerina [the leader of the group] impressed me when he and most of the people who had walked from Albuquerque set up a camp and refused to leave," Valdez told retired lawyer Mike Scarborough in the book Trespassers On Our Own Land, an oral history of the Valdez family. During the raid, Valdez shot and wounded state police officer Nick Saiz after Saiz went for his pistol and refused commands by Valdez to put his hands up. "It came down to; I shoot him or he was going to shoot me — so I pulled the trigger," Valdez is quoted as saying in the book. "Lucky for both of us, he didn't die." The raiders also beat a deputy and took a sheriff and reporter hostage. After holding at the courthouse for a couple of hours, the armed group fled to the mountains under pursuit from the National Guard. Valdez was convicted of assault and sentenced to 10 to 12 years in prison, but was later pardoned by Governor Bruce King. The episode cemented Valdez and Tijerina's legacy among activists from the Chicano Movement of the 1970s who favoured more radical methods of fighting discrimination over those of the moderate Mexican American civil rights leaders a generation before.

"He loved the attention," said daughter Juanita Montoya, 48. "He wanted people to know our history and what happened to our land." Valdez died peacefully from apparent heart conditions at his Canjilon ranch on August 25, 2012.
