= Elisabeth von Janota-Bzowski =

German artist and graphic designer

- Born: 23 November 1912
- Died: 15 August 2012 (aged 99)
- Known for: Graphic Design

Elisabeth von Janota-Bzowski (23 November 1912 – 15 August 2012) was a German graphic artist known for her postage stamps and magazine designs. Born in Kiel, Schleswig-Holstein Province, in 1912, Von Janota-Bzowski sold her first art as a teenager.

She began designing stamps later in her career. Von Janota-Bzowski designed more than thirty stamps for the Deutsche Post during her career. She one remarked, "Eine Briefmarke ist ein Mini-Plakat, und ein Plakat ist ein Telegramm," which roughly translates to, "A stamp is a mini-poster, and a poster is a telegram."

She died in Marl, North Rhine-Westphalia, Germany, on 15 August 2012, at the age of 99.
