= Lou Costello (footballer) =

English footballer (1936–2012)

Personal information
- Full name: Mortimer Daniel Costello
- Date of birth: 8 July 1936
- Place of birth: Dagenham, England
- Date of death: 8 August 2012 (aged 76)
- Place of death: Doddinghurst, England
- Position: Wing half

Senior career*
Years	Team	Apps	(Gls)
- Leytonstone
1956–1957	Aldershot	28	(7)
1957–1965	Southend United	251	(15)
1965–1971	Chelmsford City	168	(12)
1971–1972	Stevenage Athletic	10	(2)
- * Club domestic league appearances and goals

Mortimer Daniel Costello (8 July 1936 — 8 August 2012) was an English footballer who played as a wing half.

== Career ==
Costello began his career at Leytonstone, before signing for Aldershot in 1956. Costello remained at Aldershot for a single season, signing for Southend United in 1957. At Southend, Costello played 266 times in all competitions, scoring 15 goals. In 1965, Costello signed for fellow Essex club Chelmsford City. During his time at Chelmsford, Costello made 287 appearances in all competitions, scoring 24 times, winning the 1967–68 Southern League in the process. Following his time at Chelmsford, Costello played for Stevenage Athletic, where he scored three times in 11 appearances in all competitions.

== Personal life ==
A tailor by trade, Costello founded Costello Tailors in 1970.
