= Pontus Schultz =

- Born: Nils Axel Pontus Forsström; 22 August 1972; Bromma, Sweden
- Died: 25 August 2012 (aged 40); Alpes-Maritimes, France
- Occupations: Journalist, columnist, debater and entrepreneur
- Spouse: Lisen Schultz

Nils Axel Pontus Forsström Schultz (22 August 1972 – 25 August 2012) was a Swedish journalist, columnist, debater and entrepreneur. He was chief editor and publisher of Veckans Affärer from 2006 until his death.

Schultz participated in the French cyclosportive Haute Route on 25 August 2012. He crashed into a ravine and died during the last stage.

The Swedish magazine Résumé gave him a tribute after his death.
