= William Kent (artist) =

American sculptor

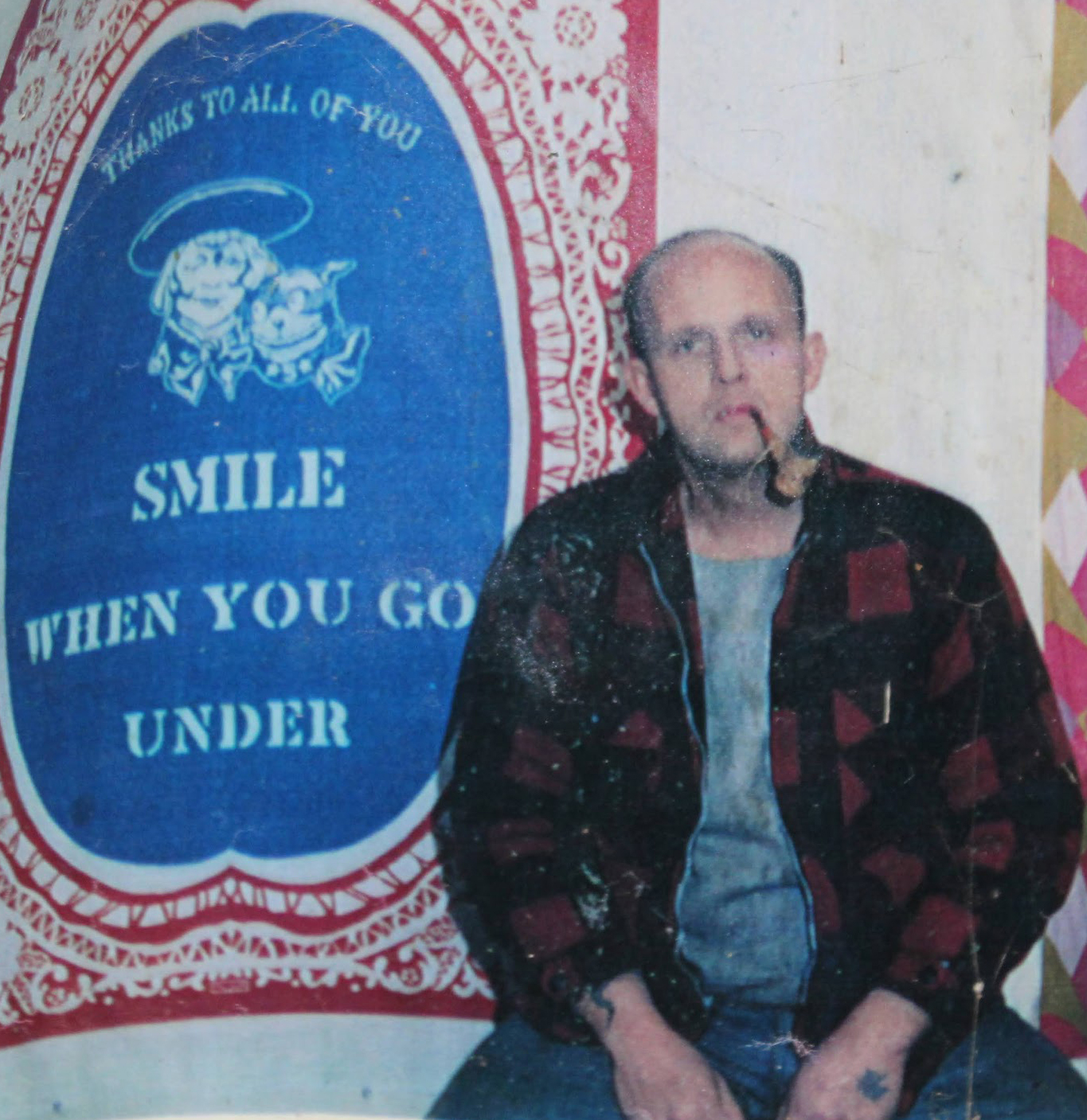
- Born: 1919; Kansas City, Missouri
- Died: August 16, 2012 (aged 92–93); Durham, Connecticut
- Education: Northwestern University, Yale University
- Occupations: Artist, sculptor, printmaker
- Website: https://williamkentfoundation.org/

William Kent (C. 1919 - August 16, 2012) was an American sculptor and printmaker. He is known for inventing a new form of printing for his artworks involving slate printing.

== Biography ==
William Kent was born in Kansas City, Missouri, in 1919. During the Great Depression, his family struggled to make ends meet. However, Kent shone with his skill to play the piano and his high reading ability. In 1940, Kent was drafted into the US Navy and served at the Naval Station at Great Lakes as a storekeeper. He graduated from Northwestern University, Chicago, and later came to Yale University to study music theory with world-famous composer Paul Hindemith.

While at Yale he became interested in art, and began to teach himself to paint in oils, sculpt in clay, and carve in marble and wood. Kent cites meeting Katherine S. Dreier as one of the catalysts for this shift from music to visual art. In the early 1960s he began carving huge discarded slate blackboards, and developed a unique method of printing monoprints on fabric without assistance or the use of machinery. His exhibitions in New York City in the 1960s were critically acclaimed, and his sculptures and slate prints were bought by museums and important collectors. He had a one-person exhibition at the Castellane Gallery in New York City, which is considered to be one of the first 'Pop Art' exhibitions. In 1966, he was featured in the Whitney Museum of American Art's exhibit of leading Pop Art figures.

In 1964, Kent moved to a farm house in Durham, Connecticut and continued working there on his monumental wood sculptures all the way up until two days before his death in 2012. Kent became the first curator for the John Slade Ely House, an art center in New Haven, Connecticut. However, in 1965, he was fired from this job after some of his work was deemed 'pornographic' by some New Haven locals. Additionally, the Castellane Gallery closed in 1967, which left Kent struggling financially. He became depressed and isolated himself from society, working by himself in his Durham home.

It is estimated that Kent carved over 800 wood sculptures and made over 2,000 prints. Many of these works remain in his house at Durham.

In 2009, he received an award honoring artistic excellence from the Arts Council of Greater New Haven. In recent years he has exhibited locally with The Sculpture Mile at Madison, Greene Art Gallery, Guilford, the York Square Cinema in New Haven, and Kehler Liddell Gallery in Westville.

A number of years before his death he formed the William Kent Charitable Foundation for the purpose of helping indigent artists over 60 years of age, a state in which he found himself at times over the years.

== Style ==
Kent was self-taught and is often labelled an outsider artist. While initially grouped into the Pop Art movement, Kent denied this association, stating “I never studied art. If I had I wouldn’t be doing this kind of work. Some professor would have told me the ‘right’ way to do art”. Kent was seen as much more confrontational and provocative than typical pop artists. His work had strong environmental, social, and political messages and were usually satirical and humorous, but also possessed an angry, bitter tone. Some pieces depicted zoomorphic subjects, especially fish and insects, or contained phallic imagery. Prints of major political figures and provocative remarks were also common.

Kent was acclaimed for is invention of a new form of printing using slate. Print historian Fritz Eichenberg was especially fond of Kent's work, hailing it as a new medium in his 1976 book The Art of the Print.
