= Lijon Eknilang =

Marshallese activist and nuclear fallout survivor

Lijon Eknilang (March 1, 1946 – August 2012) was a Marshallese activist and nuclear fallout survivor. Eknilang advocated on behalf of residents of Rongelap Atoll, who were victims of nuclear fallout stemming from the Castle Bravo hydrogen bomb test at Bikini Atoll in 1954.

== Biography ==
Eknilang was just eight years old at the time of the Castle Bravo hydrogen bomb test on March 1, 1954. The resulting fallout from the test on Bikini Atoll sent a snowstorm-like covering of radioactive fallout, which covered Rongelap Atolls. The eighty-two residents of Rongelap, including Eknilang, suffered long-term health problems due to the radiation. Eknilang suffered eight miscarriages and could not have children.

Eknilang traveled extensively throughout the United States and Europe to draw attention to the health problems experienced by Rongelap's residents due to Castle Bravo. She has been called an "icon in the Marshall Islands for her international advocacy on behalf of nuclear test victims." Eknilang spoke on behalf of the former residents of Rongelap before the United States Congress. She also spoke before the Advisory Proceedings on the Legality of the Threat or Use of Nuclear Weapons at the International Court of Justice in The Hague in November 1995.

Lijon Eknilang died in Majuro in late August 2012.
