= Riccardo Ruotolo =

- Auxiliary-bishop of Roman Catholic Archdiocese of Manfredonia-Vieste-San Giovanni Rotondo
- Church: Roman Catholic Church
- See: Archdiocese of Manfredonia-Vieste-San Giovanni Rotondo
- In office: 1995 - 2004

Orders
- Ordination: 15 July 1951
- Consecration: 6 January 1996 by pope John Paul II

Personal details
- Born: Andria, Italy
- Died: San Giovanni Rotondo, Italy

Styles of Riccardo Ruotolo
- Reference style: The Most Reverend
- Spoken style: Your Excellency
- Religious style: Monsignor
- Posthumous style: none

Riccardo Ruotolo (15 November 1928 – 1 August 2012) was the titular bishop of Castulo and auxiliary bishop of the Catholic Archdiocese of Manfredonia-Vieste-San Giovanni Rotondo, Italy.

Ordained to the priesthood in 1951, Ruotolo became bishop in 1995 and he was 25 years (1978–2003) special delegate of the Holy See and president of the "Fondazione casa Sollievo della Sofferenza, Opera di San Pio da Pietrelcina".

He retired in 2004 and died in 2012.

== Resources ==
- Profile of Mons. Ruotolo www.catholic-hierarchy.org
