= Tomáš Sedláček (general) =

Czech general (1918–2012)

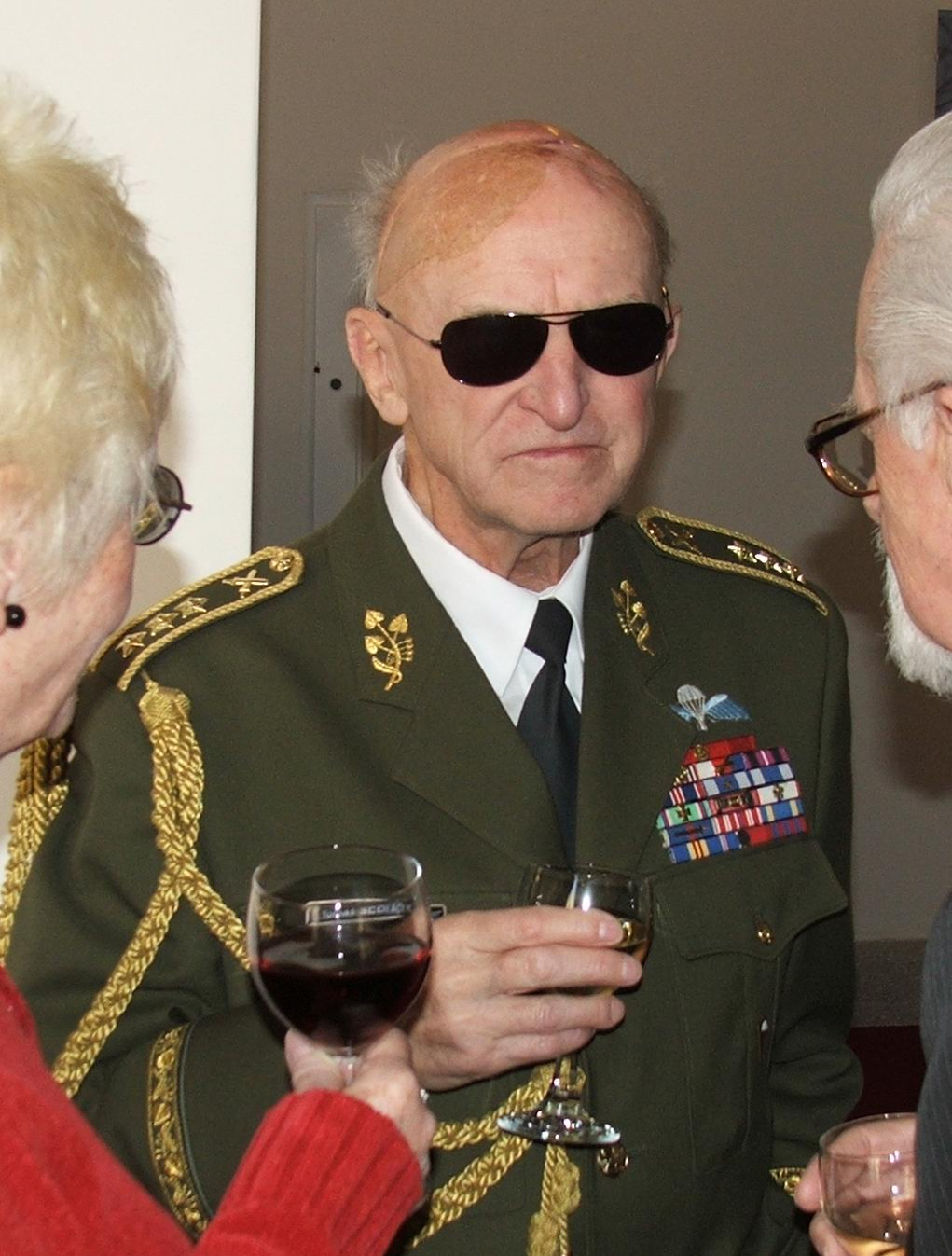
Sedláček in 2008

Tomáš Sedláček (8 January 1918 – 27 August 2012) was a Czech general.

== Biography ==
Sedláček was born on 8 January 1918 in Vienna. He studied at the Military Academy in Hranice and fled to France in 1940 when his nation was occupied by Nazi troops. After France was defeated, Sedláček joined the British Army. In England, he went through paratrooper training. He then moved to the Soviet Union in 1944 and helped liberate Czechoslovakia.

After the liberation of Czechoslovakia, he was promoted to Major and graduated from the Military College in Prague. In the summer of 1948, he then became the Head of the Operation Division of the 11th Infantry Division in Plzeň. Starting in 1949, he taught at the Military Academy in Prague.

After the Communists took power in Czechoslovakia, he was arrested in 1951 and tortured in the Domeček in Prague. He was then convicted of anti-communist activities and jailed for life. He was imprisoned in the prisons of Valdice, Mírov, Leopoldov, and Bytíz. He was released in 1960 and exonerated by the Velvet Revolution in 1989.

After November 1989, he was rehabilitated. He became the chairman of the Confederation of Political Prison Inspection Commission and the chairman of the Czechoslovak Legionary communities. He also worked in the Central Rehabilitation Commission of the MNO. In 1999, he was promoted to the rank of Lieutenant General, then on 14 November 2008, he was promoted to the highest military rank of Army General.

Sedlacek died on the 27 August 2012 in Prague, of melanoma at the age of 94.

== Personal life ==
Sedláček was a practicing member of the Czechoslovak Hussite Church.
