= Shimon Lev-Ari =

Israeli actor (1942–2012)

- שמעון לב-ארי
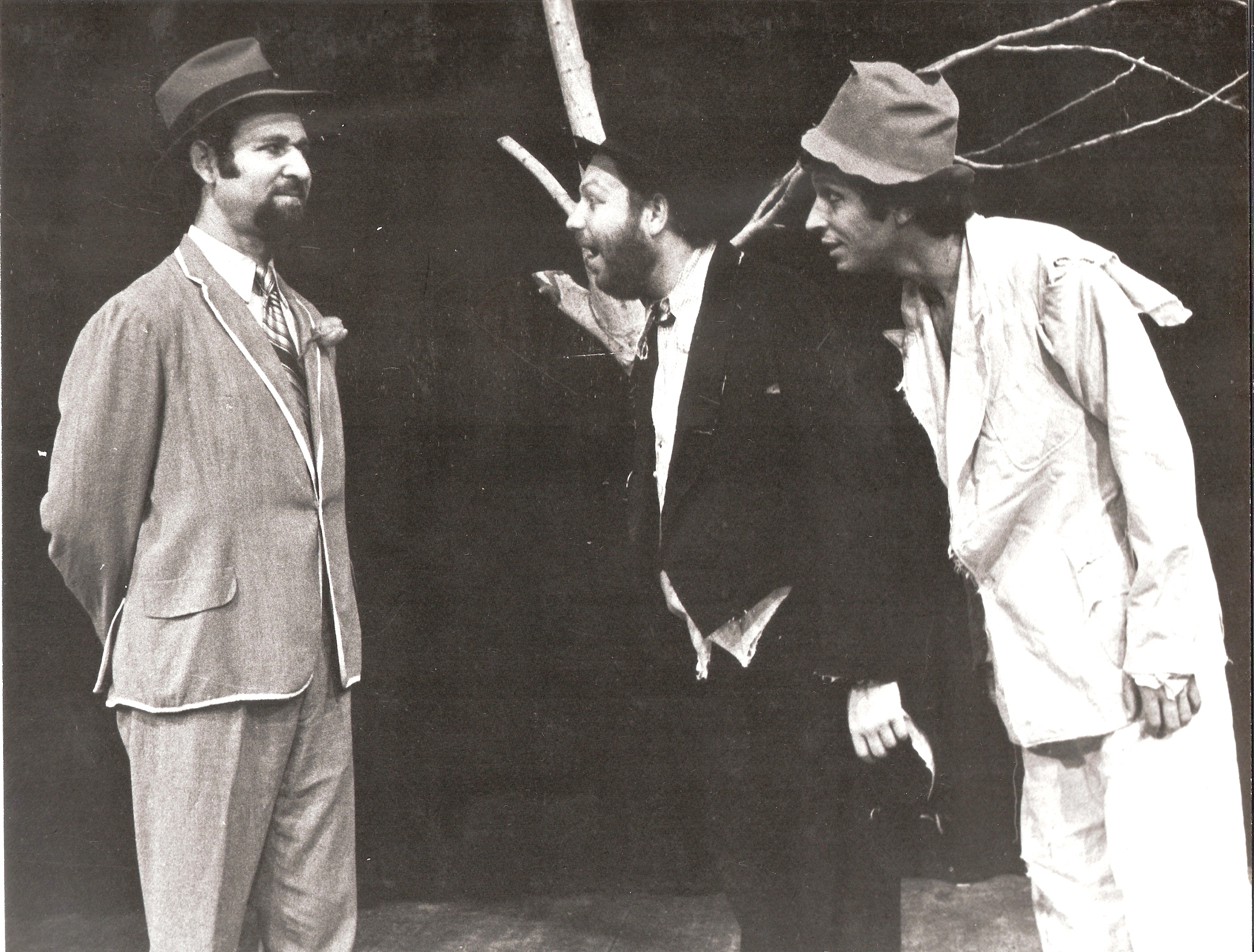
- Lev-Ari (centre) performing on stage in 1973
- Born: Shimon Lobel; 6 August 1942; Bucharest, Romania
- Died: 21 August 2012 (aged 70); Bat Yam, Israel
- Occupations: Actor; director; translator; educator; archivist
- Years active: 1961–2009
- Children: 3, including Dorit Lev-Ari

Shimon Lev-Ari (Hebrew: שמעון לב-ארי; 6 August 1942 – 21 August 2012) was an Israeli actor, theatre director and translator.
