= Paule Castaing =

French chef

Paulette Castaing, née Paule Germaine Célina Penel, often known as Mère Castaing, born 14 March 1911 in Nîmes (Gard) and died 9 August 2012 in Lyon (Rhône) aged 103, was a French chef, twice starred in the Michelin Guide from 1964 to 1984, and 3 out of the maximum of 4 Toques in Gault Millau in 1967 for her restaurant 'Beau Rivage' in Condrieu (Rhône). She is considered the last of the Mères Lyonnaises, the famous female restaurant owners-chefs offering traditional, high quality Lyonnaise cuisine.

Castaing was born in Nîmes to parents who were bakers who then moved to Alboussière, in Ardèche. She obtained her school certificate in 1923, then her Higher Diploma in 1924 when she began a cooking apprenticeship with Mademoiselle Cheynet at the Hôtel Beau Séjour in Alboussière. The hotel was then bought by Eugénie Castaing, widow of Pierre Castaing. Castaing continued her apprenticeship in the establishment with chef Chazotte, from whom she learned the basics of classic cuisine, then with chefs Chauvin and Rambion. She was later put in charge of the kitchen. She met Eugénie Castaing's son, Raymond, a student at the hotel school in Nice, and they were married in Porte-lès-Valence in 1933.

Paule and Raymond Castaing worked during the winter seasons in Megève from 1933. During the Nazi occupation, the hotel was requisitioned by the Vichy regime. From 1933, she worked the seasons in Megève and the couple worked for a poultry breeder in Villefranche-sur-Saône then at the restaurant Alaize in the Rue Royale, Lyon; Paule managed the kitchen and Raymond was head waiter. In the same street Eugénie Brazier had already been in operation since 1921. Paulette had refused a job with the already-starred "Mère Brazier" but called her "Mère" out of respect.

In 1946, Eugénie Castaing sold the Beau Séjour hotel in Alboussière and bought shares for Paule and Raymond in a small hotel-restaurant on the banks of the Rhône, the Maison du pêcheur (Fisherman's House) with gardens and terraces in Condrieu, which they transformed into a more upscale establishment and renamed it the Beau Rivage. The Beau Rivage became a privileged stage on the Paris-Côte d'Azur axis and received personalities such as Sacha Guitry, René Clair, and Charles Vanel.

The cuisine of Mère Castaing attracted the attention of the Michelin Guide which awarded it a first star in 1950 and a second star in 1963. The two stars were kept until 1988.

== Specialities ==
Castaing specialised in menus of freshwater fish including blue or Champagne trout, and eel matelote, one of her signature dishes, made from eels from the Rhône purchased alive. It was topped with grilled and garlic-rubbed croutons, trussed crayfish and thinly sliced fillets of sole – dubbed "fried gudgeons" – dipped in cabbage batter and deep-fried.
