= Peter Joseph Bis =

Peter Joseph Bis (c. 1951 - August 16, 2012) was a homeless man in Washington, D.C., known by the Capitol Hill community for his social personality and keen, savant-like memory. His usual daytime location was the corner of Second Street and Massachusetts Avenue NE, sitting on a crate under a tree outside an Exxon station by Washington Union Station.

According to his brother, James Bis, Bis suffered from schizophrenia. He would greet and converse with passers-by, often offering repetitive, random advice, such as "No skinny dipping!" or pointing out the number of days until the weekend. He never drank alcohol or used drugs, but did smoke cigarettes and drink coffee. He took pride in his neighborhood, spent his days saying hello to the regulars who passed him on the sidewalk, and was provided with food and clothes by the local community. He was even given an apartment at one point, but was eventually evicted because his hoarding tendencies filled up his residence. He would usually sleep in the garage of the Exxon station, and the Exxon workers would let him use a computer in the office.

== Early life and education ==
Little is known about Bis's childhood or pre-college years. He grew up in Kalamazoo, Michigan, near Western Michigan University, the son of two teachers. According to his younger brother James, Peter Bis attended Monsignor John R. Hackett High School, where he graduated in 1969, and then Western Michigan University, where he graduated in 1974 with a bachelor's degree in history. He attended Thomas M. Cooley Law School in Lansing, Michigan for a year, then worked as a hotel night clerk, then started a car painting company. He was unable to stick with these plans, however, and eventually started wandering the country as a result of his developing schizophrenia.

== Mental health and personal traits ==
=== Schizophrenia ===
James Bis reported that the illness first appeared in Peter Bis's adult years. Peter started frequently wearing a lead-lined baseball cap with red lights. The schizophrenia was eventually diagnosed, and his family petitioned that he be committed for treatment. After only a few months of in-patient treatment, however, Bis began wandering the country. Though he was never known to have purposefully hitchhiked, he would accept rides from drivers. James Bis described his brother as "a harmless kind of schizophrenic" who avoided getting help for his illness.

Bis's schizophrenia often made it difficult for listeners to figure out what was accurate in his stories of his past. He claimed that he had received the equivalent of five or six doctorates, that he had studied in the Vatican, that he had been married and divorced, and that he once had a job as a cab driver in Michigan. While at least some of his claims were ungrounded, they endeared Bis to the community, since they could never fully figure out his true background.

=== Profound memory ===
The people of the local community frequently knew him for his keen memory. After his death, personal blogs and Washington, D.C. published articles in memory of him, specifically mentioning his uncanny memory. Washington, D.C. journalist and professor, Terry Mattingly, an Orthodox Christian, referenced a conversation with Bis in which Bis wished him a happy Easter. After Mattingly had gone a few steps, Bis stopped him and recalled that the Orthodox Easter was not until a week later. "He was right, of course. Had I shared that personal detail with him or did he glean that tidbit of liturgical minutia from one of the newspapers he read, day after day? Anyone who knew him could describe similar mysterious encounters", Mattingly wrote in his October 1, 2012 E. W. Scripps Company column.

=== Conspiracy theories ===
Besides his sharp memory, Bis was also known by the community for his conspiracy theories, which he delved into on his personal blog, which according to the title, focused on "Vatican, finances, mafia, Kalamazoo." The blog was written in third person and was one long post, which Bis added to routinely. The blog may have actually been written for him by another person, according to one source, but the identity of the person is unknown, apart from a theory that the blog's dictation "to a friend" may have been the blog's scribe. Bis reportedly believed he was an alien, and was especially known for his claim that he was Princess Diana's ex-lover, and that the Central Intelligence Agency was responsible for her death. He preferred not to refer to himself as homeless, preferring to describe himself as a "political refugee".

== Effect in Washington, D.C. ==
Numerous bloggers and Capitol Hill voices referenced him as being extremely influential in the local community. After a period of time living by the United Nations building in New York City, Bis moved to Capitol Hill in Washington, D.C. He stationed himself outside the Exxon station next to Washington Union Station, usually under the tree in front of the station. He usually sat on a crate under the tree, where he would greet passers-by every day. He would use the restrooms at the Exxon station, and help to keep it clean; he would only sleep inside the garage on especially cold nights. Other than that, he insisted on sleeping outside.

Since he usually kept his belongings under his tree, the Washington, D.C. local city government once threatened to remove his belongings. Betsy Woodruff of National Review Online reported that 24 of his acquaintances, including lobbyists and Capitol Hill staff, signed a petition against the removal of his possessions. Woodruff herself was acquainted with Bis from her time as an intern at The Heritage Foundation, which was located right next to Bis's Exxon station. She said that upon introducing a friend of hers to Bis one day, he proceeded to take them into the Exxon to watch YouTube videos, smoke, and weep over the death of what he described as his ex-girlfriend Princess Diana. "So he probably didn't date Lady Di", Woodruff wrote. "But I've never heard anyone talk about a significant other with as much passion and kindness as Pete."

A 2006 post from another blog, The World According to Marc, reported meeting Bis while he happened to be sitting on a bench near Union Station in proximity to three United States Senate buildings. The blogger, Marc, included a picture of Bis and shared the story of how Bis would never ask for money, but seemed particularly interested in the people he would meet. The blogger also mentioned that Bis gave him a business card and told him to follow his own blog, which featured a lengthy, convoluted path of far-reaching conspiracy theories. Marc said that after initially meeting, he would make a point to walk to work early so that he could sit and chat with Bis for a bit.

Another blogger, Josie, of TellMeAStoryJosie blog, reported having had a number of personal interactions with Bis. She reported his common "Three more days 'til the weekend!" greeting, and his unrelated "No skinny dipping!" advice. "Pete was as much a part of the landscape of our life here on the Hill as the Capitol dome in the distance," she wrote in her post about him following the news of his death.

Bis also was a popular individual for many Washington, D.C. interns, including the interns for Talk Radio News, two of whom performed an interview with him in 2008. Also in 2008, an intern at the Washington Journalism Center blogged about him on the program's blog.

== Death ==
His death on August 16, 2012 was initially reported by the blog Running For 28 Years, published in the Washington metropolitan area. The blogger reported that he awoke to flashing blue and red lights around 1:30 a.m. outside his apartment window, not far from the Exxon station. After walking to the station, the blogger inquired with a police officer about what was occurring, and the officer confirmed that Bis had been found dead inside the Exxon garage from an apparent heart attack. His body was later cremated and sent to his brother, James Bis.

A neighborhood Catholic church, St. Joseph's on Capitol Hill, held a memorial Mass for him several weeks later. Terry Mattingly reported that a painting of Bis, A Contemplation of Justice, was placed near the entrance of the church. The homilist, Deacon Gary Bockweg, said that over the years many people suggested opportunities for Bis to get off the streets and into an actual job, including Bockweg's own suggestion to work as a Wal-Mart greeter. However, Bockweg said that Bis turned down the offer, saying he was overqualified to work as a Wal-Mart greeter. Additionally, Bockweg shared that when he had first seen Bis many years ago, Bis had been in St. Joseph's and was well-dressed but quiet. As time passed, Bis began to arrive with less propriety, and even began bringing a wheelchair that stored what appeared to be his personal effects. He also grew more talkative, which drew Bockweg to get to know him better.

"The last thing people do today when talking to a stranger is call them by name," said Bockweg. "That's how Pete connected...He called us by name and that slowed us down. That made Pete real to us."
