= Robert W. McNitt =

- Born: July 29, 1915; Perth Amboy, New Jersey
- Died: August 12, 2012 (aged 97) Annapolis, Maryland
- Allegiance: United States
- Branch: United States Navy
- Rank: Admiral
- Wars: World War II; Korean War
- Awards: Silver Star (2)

Robert W. McNitt (July 29, 1915 – August 12, 2012) was an American United States Navy admiral who was dean of admissions at the United States Naval Academy for more than a decade.

He graduated from the Naval Academy in 1938. During World War II, he was an executive officer to the submarine USS Barb which served in the Pacific and was credited with sinking 29 Japanese ships.

In 1967 he was promoted to the rank of rear admiral. He received two Silver Stars, including one for rescuing Allied prisoners of war. One year after retiring in 1971, McNitt was appointed the first civilian dean of admissions at the Naval Academy, serving in that capacity for 12 years.
