= Edmund Skellings =

American poet

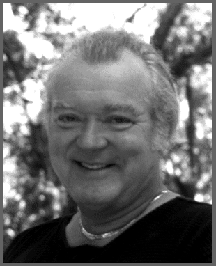
- Born: 12 March 1932; Ludlow, Massachusetts, USA
- Died: 19 August 2012 (aged 80); West Melbourne, Florida, USA
- Occupation: Poet
- Spouse: Louise Skellings
- Website: www.edmundskellings.com

Edmund Skellings (March 12, 1932 – August 19, 2012) was an American poet. He was the Poet Laureate of Florida from 1980 to 2012, and was succeeded by Peter Meinke.

== Biography ==
Edmund Skellings was born in 1932 in Ludlow, Massachusetts.

He attended Suffield Academy during his schooling career. In 1957, Skellings graduated with English honors from the University of Massachusetts Amherst. He received his doctorate in British and American literature from the University of Iowa, where he taught prosody and metrics in the Iowa Writer's Workshop.

In 1962, he published the first record-book, Duels and Duets, while experimenting with magnetic tape at the University of Iowa. The book's covers contained vinyl recording of the poet's voice. It ended up winning the Chicago Midwest Award for design. During this time Skellings also experimented with video-poems created by a combination of multicamera switching and cinescope transmission. These video-poems were then aired by WSUI.

In 1963, he founded the Alaska Writer's Workshop at the University of Alaska in Fairbanks. Skellings also organized the Alaska Flying Poets (an Upward Bound project), a group of five professors from the Workshop who flew a small airplane around Alaska and the Midwest to talk to high school students about the value of learning to write well. The program was an enormous success and influenced many students to attend college. The Office of Economic Opportunity even gave the poets a grant to fly out and visit students at fourteen different universities.

In 1967, Skellings joined the faculty of Florida Atlantic University where he taught Understanding Poetry and Shakespeare. He began to experiment with audio amplification and modification to augment his performance of poetry and billed himself as "The First Electric Poet." During the late 60s, he took his Electric Poet performance to scores of college campuses and appeared on numerous television stations such as NETCHE, a Nebraska college and university network. As his experimentation continued, Black Box, a cassette magazine, distributed a recording of his sixteen-track fifteen-minute concerto. Later, a quadraphonic three-dimensional voice recording of his was distributed from a studio performance of his at the University of Wisconsin.

In 1973, Skellings became Director of the International Institute of Creative Communication at Florida International University which brought poetry in the schools programs to over 100,000 children in South Florida. Skellings then published three volumes of poetry: Heart Attacks (1976), Face Value (1977) and Showing My Age (1978) with the University Presses of Florida. He published these three together afterewards as a collection of three books called Nearing the Millenium. Parts of this collection were recorded at the United States Library of Congress. In 1980, after a competition of four hundred Florida poets, Governor Robert Graham appointed Skellings the Poet Laureate of the State of Florida, a lifetime honor. Skellings published a new collection of poetry, Living Proof (1985) with the University Presses of Florida. Living Proof was a collection that celebrated the creative work of both artists and scientists. His most recent book is Collected Poems 1958-1998, published by the University Press of Florida, Gainesville. The book also contains a Compact Disc recording of Skellings reading fifty Selected Poems.

Edmund Skellings poetry has received high praise from some of America's most respected poets. After reading Heart Attacks, Robert Penn Warren wrote Skellings poems had, "True imagination, the real flash of language, the living rhythm." William Stafford wrote, "One of the greatest things since Shakespeare loosed Puck.” And Richard Eberhart wrote, "Racy gifts. They hardly hold themselves down to earth."

Skellings purchased his first personal computer in 1978, and immediately applied for a patent which used matching colors on a computer monitor to show relationships between alphanumerics and symbols. He was awarded a United States patent for his color system in 1981, and later received similar patents from the United Kingdom and Canada. Skellings' system of organizing text on a color monitor led to the publication of a color authoring system entitled Electric Poet by International Business Machines Inc. in 1984 and a further product entitled Easy Street by McGraw-Hill. Electric Poet was distributed to English faculty at nine of the state universities in Florida along with an Apple microcomputer. IBM then published Electric Poet along with Comma Cat, and called Skellings' system "the best of the best" in computer-assisted teaching programs. IBM later appointed Edmund Skellings as one of twelve IBM Consulting scholars in the entire nation in 1989 and awarded him a grant to establish a Florida Writers Network to connect three universities creative writing programs.

In 1986, Skellings designed and implemented a microcomputer information system for the Florida House of Representatives and its district offices. The system was the first large scale legislative implementation of a token-ring network. It was one of the first government systems to utilize electronic mail to transfer documents.

Skellings became the founding Director of the Florida Center for Electronic Communication at Florida Atlantic University in Fort Lauderdale in 1990. There he developed one of the first Master of Fine Arts degrees in Computer Arts in the country. The Florida Center for Electronic Communication achieved an international reputation for the quality of its graduate program and the unique form of award-winning animated computer poems Skellings taught his students to create. Students wrote their own poems or selected favorite poems on which to base their imagery. They recorded the audio of the poem and occasionally collaborated with a musician to create a musical score for their animation. The Videography Magazine named the center's supercomputer studio "National Room of the Month". Skellings ended up being responsible for bringing over six million dollars to Florida Atlantic University during his time there from 1990 to 2006.

In 1992, Skellings developed yet another way to teach poetry by generating moving pictures to illustrate ideas in lines of poems. They were dubbed "SuperPoems" and presented by the American Film Institute during the National Video Festival. Skellings won awards from the New York Film Festival, Chicago Film Festival, National Poetry Festival Telly Awards, Berlin Film Festival, and the Image Forum Festivals in Japan. Skellings work became truly global.

In 2002, Skellings won the Videographer Crystal Award of Excellence for his video disc Word Songs, a surround sound recording of his own poetry and the first collection of 3D animated poetry in the world. This was the project which finally fulfilled Skellings early desires for what he wanted out of electronic poetry.

The Evans Library of the Florida Institute of Technology contains digitized Edmund Skellings innovative multimedia archives. The project began during the summer of 2009. The Edmund Skellings Collection contains literary correspondence, reviews of Skellings' poetry and innovative research, publications, lectures, and interviews.

Dr. Edmund Skellings was appointed a University Professor of Humanities at the Florida Institute of Technology in 2008, where he divided his time writing poetry and promoting programs in the humanities.

He retired in 2011 and also decided to step down from his lifetime appointment at the same time to allow new poets to take this honorary position.

He died in his West Melbourne, Florida, home on August 19, 2012.

Two films were made to look back at what Edmund Skellings accomplished. "Edmund Skellings: A Man Ahead of His Time" premiered in January 2011, while "Edmunds Skellings in His Own Words" premiered on October 12, 2012.

== Publications ==
=== Poetry ===
- Collected Poems, (University Press of Florida, 1998)
- Living Proof, (University Press of Florida, 1987)
- Showing My Age, (University Press of Florida, 1978)
- Face Value, (University Press of Florida, 1977)
- Heart Attacks, (University Press of Florida, 1976)
- The Marriage Fire, (Qara Press, 1963)
- Duels and Duets, (Qara Press, 1962)
- The Comma Cat, (Cornell Series, 1962) (children's verse)

=== Recordings ===
- Word Songs, (DVD, Florida Center for Electronic Communication, 2002)
- Selected Poems, (CD, University Press of Florida, 1997)
- Nearing The Millennium, (Compact Cassette, The Library of Congress, 1977)
- Ultra-Red, (Compact Cassette, Black Box, 1973)
- The Marriage Fire, (LP, RCA Victor, 1963)
- Duels and Duets, (LP, RCA Victor, 1961)

=== Software ===
- EasyStreet,(McGraw-Hill, 1986)
- Electric Literature Series, (IBM, 1984)
  - Electric Poet
  - Comma Cat
  - Dictionary Dog

== Awards ==
- Walk of Fame, 1997, Rollins College
- Doctor of Fine Arts, 1995, International Fine Arts College
- Moretti Award, 1983, American Express-Hollywood Sun Tattler
- Florida's Poet Laureate, 1980, Lifetime Appointment
- Florida Governor's Award for the Arts, 1979, Artist
