= István Andrássy (scientist) =

Hungarian nematologist (1927–2012)

István Andrássy (5 May 1927, Szolnok, Hungary - 4 August 2012, Budapest) was a Hungarian nematologist. Starting with his first publication in 1952 on the nematode fauna of Mount Bükk, over his dissertation in 1973 on the evolution of nematodes (published as ) to his last days he was a very prolific scientist, publishing more than 200 manuscripts, chapters and books on the class of Nematoda. He described 530 taxa of nematodes and at least 60 nematode taxa are named after him, which shows the huge respect he had in the nematologists' world.

== Nematode taxa named after Andràssy ==
- Andrassya Brzeski, 1960
- Afrodorylaimus andrassyi Zullini, 1973
- Aglenchus andrassyi Sultan, 1986
- Alaimus andrassyi Sabová, 1967
- AllodorylImus andrassyi (Meyl, 1955) Andrássy, 1986 (=Dorylaimus andrassyi Meyl, 1955)
- Andrassya Brzeski, 1960
- Anatonchus istvani Winiszewska-Slipinska, 1989
- Afrodorylaimus andrassyi Zullini, 1973
- Aglenchus andrassyi Sultan, 1986
- Alaimus andrassyi Sabová, 1967
- AllodorylImus andrassyi (Meyl, 1955) Andrássy, 1986 (=Dorylaimus andrassyi Meyl, 1955)
- Anatonchus istvani Winiszewska-Slipinska, 1989
- Aphelenchoides andrassyi Husain & Khan, 1967
- Aulolaimoides andrassyi Goseco, Ferris & Ferris, 1975
- Aulolaimus andrassyi Eliava & Eliashvili, 1973
- Bursaphelenchus andrassyi Dayi, Calin, Arkbulut, Gu, Schroder, Veira & Braasch, 2014
- Calodorylaimus andrassyi Baqri & Jana, 1983
- Calcaridorylaimus andrassyi Ahmad & Shaheen, 2004
- Caviputa andrassyi Sabová, 1967
- Chiloplectus andrassyi (Timm, 1971) Andrássy, 1984 (=Plectus andrassyi Timm, 1971)
- Chronogaster andrassyi Loof & Jairajpuri, 1965
- Coslenchus andrassyi Brzeski, 1987
- Deladenus andrassyi Vinciguerra, 1972
- Diplogasteroides andrassyi Kanzaki, Tanaka, Hirooka & Maehara, 2013
- Discolaimium andrassyi Baqri & Khera, 1975
- Discolaimus andrassyi Abou El Naga, 1989
- Discomyctus andrassyi Siddiqi, 1998
- Dorylaimellus andrassyi Heyns, 1963
- Ektaphelenchoides andrassyi Atighi, Pourjam, Aliramaji, Ye & Pedram, 2013
- Etamphidelus andrassyi Vinciguerra & Clausi, 1990
- Eumonhystera andrassyi (Bíró, 1969) Andrássy, 1981 (=Monhystera andrassyi Bíró, 1969)
- Eutobrilus andrassyi (Altherr, 1963) Tsalolikhin, 1981 (=Tobrilus andrassyi Altherr, 1963)
- Filenchus andrassyi (Szczygiel, 1969) Andrássy, 1979 (=Tylenchus andrassyi Szczygiel, 1969)
- Filenchus istvani Zell, 1988
- Glauxinema andrassyi (Timm, 1961) Andrássy, 1984 (=Diplogaster (Eudiplogaster) andrassyi Timm, 1961; Mononchoides andrassyi (Timm, 1961) Gagarin, 1998)
- Hemicycliophora andrassyi Brzeski, 1974
- Isolaimium andrassyi Hogewind & Heyns, 1967
- Labronema andrassyi Gagarin, 1992
- Malenchus andrassyi Merny, 1971
- Mesodorylaimus andrassyi Ahmad & Ahmad, 1999
- Metarhabditis andrassyana Tahseen, Hussain, Tomar, Shah & Jairajuri, 2004
- Mylonchulus andrassyi Loof, 1992
- Neothada cancellata (Thorne, 1942) Khan, 1973 (=Neothada andrassyi Heyns & Van den Berg, 1996)
- Nothacrobeles istvani Boström & Holovachov, 2013
- Nothacrobeles andrassyi Boström & Holovachov, 2013
- Nygolaimoides andrassyi Ahmad, Okada & Araki, 2003
- Ogma andrassyi Reay & Davies, 1998
- Opailaimus andrassyi Eliava & Bagathuria 2009
- Oriverutus andrassyi Peña-Santiago, Liébanas, DiscomictusTorres & Ahmad, 2013
- Oscheius andrassyi Tabassum & Shahina 2008
- Paravulvus andrassyi Heyns, 1968
- Prismatolaimus andrassyanus Mulk & Coomans, 1979
- Prismatolaimus andrassyi Khera & Chaturwedi, 1977
- Semitobrilus andrassyi Gagarin & Gusakov, 2013
- Teratorhabditis andrassyi Tahseen & Jairajpuri, 1988
- Thornenema andrassyi Khan, Jairajpuri & Ahmad, 1990
- Tigronchoides andrassyi Winiszewska, Susulovsky & Kornobis, 2013
- Tripylina iandrassyi Cid del Prado-Vera, Ferris & Nadler, 2016.
- Tylenchus neoandrassyi Geraert & Raski, 1987
- Xiphinemella andrassyi Ahmad, Rahaman & Jairajpuri, 1983

== Bibliography ==
- Andrássy, I. (1952): Freilebende Nematoden aus dem Bükk-Gebirge. Annales historico-naturales Musei nationalis hungarici, 2: 13–65.
- Andrássy, I. (1953): Freilebende Nematoden aus einer Torf-Probe. Nematologische Notizen, 1. Zoologischer Anzeiger, 150: 30–35.
- Andrássy, I. (1953): Die Wirkung der verschiedenen Pflanzenarten auf die Zusammensetzung der in der Rhizosphäre lebenden Nematodengemeinschaften. Annales historico-naturales Musei nationalis hungarici, 3: 93-99.
- Andrássy, I. (1953): Eine neue Art der Gattung Trilobus Bastian. Nematologische Notizen, 2. Annales historico-naturales Musei nationalis hungarici, 4: 71-73.
- Andrássy, I. (1953): Bátorliget vízben élő féregfaunája (Vermes). [Freshwater worm fauna of Bátorliget (Vermes)] In. Székessy, V. (Ed.) Bátor- liget élővilága, Akadémiai Kiadó Budapest, p. 143– 145.
- Andrássy, I. (1954): Über einige von Daday beschriebene Nematoden-Arten. Zoologischer Anzeiger, 152: 138–145.
- Andrássy, I. (1954): Parasitische Nematoden aus der Wurzel der Baumwolle. Annales Biologicae Universitatum Hungariae Budapestiensis, 2: 3–7.
- Andrássy, I. (1954): Drei neue Arten aus der Superfamilie Tylenchoidea. Nematologische Notizen, 3. Annales Biologicae Universitatum Hungariae Budapestiensis, 2: 9–15.
- Andrássy, I. (1954): Revision der Gattung Tylenchus Bastian, 1865 (Tylenchidae, Nematoda). Acta Zoologica Hungarica, 1: 5–42.
- Andrássy, I. (1955): Egy új burgonya-kártevő hazánkban. [A new potato pest in Hungary] Agrártudomány, 8: 123–124.
- Andrássy, I. (1955): Gyűrűsférgek (Annelida), I. Kevéssertéjű gyűrűsférgek (Oligochaeta). Magyarország állatvilága, 3(10): 1–59.
- Andrássy, I. (1955): Troglochaetus beranecki Delachaux, ein Repräsentant der für die Fauna Ungarns neuen Tierklasse Archiannelida. Annales historico- naturales Musei nationalis hungarici, 7: 371–375.
- Andrássy, I. (1955): Az erdei talajban élő fonálférgek (Nematoda) mennyiségi és produkciósbiológiai vizsgálata. [Quantitative and production biological investigations on free-living nematodes of forest-soils] PhD Dissertation, Budapest pp. 260.
- Andrássy, I. (1956): Die Rauminhalts- und Gewichtsbestimmung der Fadenwürmer (Nematoden). Acta Zoologica Hungarica, 2: 1–15.
- Andrássy, I. (1956): Eine interessante Nematodenfauna der Gerste. Nematologische Notizen, 4. Acta Zoologica Hungarica, 2: 307–317.
- Andrássy, I. (1956): Süsswasser-Nematoden aus Französisch-West-Afrika. Opuscula Zoologica Budapest, 1: 3–18.
- Andrássy, I. (1957): Deladenus aridus n. sp. und ein Wiederfund von Deladenus saccatus Andrássy, 1954. Nematologische Notizen 5. Opuscula Zoologica Budapest, 2: 3–8.
- Andrássy, I. (1957): Thornia gubernaculifera n. sp., ein neuer Süsswassernematode aus Ungarn. Nematologische Notizen 6. Opuscula Zoologica Budapest, 2: 9–14.
- Andrássy, I. (1957): Über die Gattung Chronogaster Cobb, 1913 (Nematoda, Plectidae). Annales Universitatis Scientiarum Budapestinensis de Rolando Eötvös Nominatae. Sectio biologica, 1: 3–12.
- Andrássy, I. (1957): Aphelenchoides citri n. sp., ein neuer Wurzelparasit der Zitrone. Nematologica, 2: 237–240.
- Andrássy, I. (1957): Zwei neue Arten der Gattung Amphidelus Thorne, 1939. Opuscula Zoologica Budapest, 2: 3–8.
- Andrássy, I. (1957): Dorylaimus rugosus n. sp., ein neuer Nematode aus Ungarn. Nematologische Notizen 7. Opuscula Zoologica Budapest, 2: 9–11.
- Andrássy, I. (1958): Dorylaimus deuberti n. sp., eine neue süsswasserbewohnende Nematoden-Art. Opuscula Zoologica Budapest, 2: 3–6.
- Andrássy, I. (1958): Noch einmal über die Gattung Chronogaster Cobb, 1913. Opuscula Zoologica Budapest 2: 7–11.
- Andrássy, I. (1958): Szabadonélő fonálférgek (Nematoda libera). Magyarország állatvilága, 3: (36): 1–362.
- Andrássy, I. (1958): Hoplolaimus tylenchiformis Daday, 1905 (Syn. H. coronatus Cobb, 1923) und die Gattungen der Unterfamilie Hoplolaiminae Filipjev, 1936. Nematologica, 3: 44–56.
- Andrássy, I. (1958): Diplogaster lepidus n. sp. und der Schlüssel der Diplogaster-Arten von unpaarigem Ovar. Nematologica, 3: 295–300.
- Andrássy, I. (1958): Erd- und Süsswassernematoden aus Bulgarien. Acta Zoologica Hungarica, 4: 1–88.
- Andrássy, I. (1958): Ergebnisse der zoologischen Aufsammlungen der Ungarischen Naturwissenschaftlichen Museums in Ägypten im Jahre 1957. 2. Nematoden aus ägyptischen Gewässern. Annales historico-naturales Musei nationalis hungarici, 50: 135–150.
- Andrássy, I. (1958): Über das System der Mononchiden (Mononchidae Chitwood, 1937; Nematoda). Annales historico-naturales Musei nationalis hungarici, 50: 151–171.
- Andrássy, I. (1959): Nematoden aus der Tropf- steinhöhle "Baradla" bei Aggtelek (Ungarn), nebst einer Übersicht der bisher aus Höhlen bekannten freilebenden Nematoden-Arten. Acta Zoologica Hungarica, 4: 253–277.
- Andrássy, I. (1959): Die Mundhöhlentypen der Mononchiden und der Schlüssel der Mylonchulus- Arten (Nematoda). Opuscula Zoologica Budapest, 3: 3–12.
- Andrássy, I. (1959): Dorylaimus holdemani n. sp., eine neue Nematoden-Art aus Bulgarien. Opuscula Zoologica Budapest, 3: 13–17.
- Andrássy, I. (1959): Freilebende Nematoden aus Rumänien. Annales Universitatis Scientiarum Budapestinensis de Rolando Eötvös Nominatae. Sectio biologica, 2: 3–27.
- Andrássy, I. (1959): Weitere Nematoden aus der Tropfsteinhöhle "Baradla". Acta Zoologica Hungarica, 5: 1–6.
- Andrássy, I. (1959): Neubenennungen einiger homonymen Nematoden-Gattungen. Nematologica, 4: 223–226.
- Andrássy, I. (1959): Taxonomische Übersicht der Dorylaimen (Nematoda), I. Acta Zoologica Hungarica, 5: 191–240.
- Andrássy, I. (1959): Was ist Dadays Nematoden-Art Pseudochromadora quadripapillata? Opuscula Zoologica Budapest, 3: 51–55.
- Andrássy, I. & Coman, D. (1959): Eine - vermutlich neue – Meloidogyne-Art (Nematoda) aus einer Wasserleitung. Opuscula Zoologica Budapest, 3: 57– 60.
- Andrássy, I. (1959): Ergebnisse der zoologischen Aufsammlungen des Ungarischen Naturwissenschaftlichen Museums in Ägypten im Jahre 1957. 3. Einige Nematoden aus dem Roten Meer. Annales historico-naturales Musei nationalis hungarici, 51: 247–257.
- Andrássy, I. (1959): Neue und wenig bekannte Nematoden aus Jugoslawien. Annales historiconaturales Musei nationalis hungarici, 51: 259–275.
- Andrássy, I. (1959): Nematoden aus dem Psammon des Adige-Flusses. Memorie del Museo Civico di Storia Naturale di Verona, 7: 163–181.
- Andrássy, I. (1960): Taxonomische Übersicht der Dorylaimen (Nematoda), II. Acta Zoologica Hungarica, 6: 1–28.
- Andrássy, I. (1960): Panagrobelus topayi n. sp., eine neue Nematoden-Art aus Kenya. Zoologischer Anzeiger, 164: 195–198.
- Andrássy, I. (1960): Zwei bemerkenswerte Nematoden-Arten aus Belgisch-Kongo. Opuscula Zoologica Budapest, 3: 101–110.
- Andrássy, I. (1960): Nematologische Notizen, 8. Opuscula Zoologica Budapest, 3: 114–116.
- Andrássy, I. (1960): Einige Nematoden aus Afghanistan. Opuscula Zoologica Budapest, 4: 3–14.
- Andrássy, I. (1960): Nematoden aus dem Periphyton der Landungsmolen der Donau zwischen Budapest und Mohács. (Danubialia Hungarica, III.) Annales Universitatis Scientiarum Budapestinensis de Rolando Eötvös Nominatae. Sectio biologica, 3: 3–21.
- Andrássy, I. (1960): Beiträge zur Kenntnis der freilebenden Nematoden Chinas. Annales historico- naturales Musei nationalis hungarici, 52: 2301– 216.
- Andrássy, I. (1961): Zur Taxonomie der Neotylenchiden. Nematologica, 6: 25–36.
- Andrássy, I. (1961): Eine neue Art der seltenen Nematoden-Gattung Triplonchium Cobb, 1920. Nematologica, 6: 37–41.
- Andrássy, I. (1961): Neue und seltene Arten der Familie Alaimidae (Nematoda). Acta Zoologica Hungarica, 7: 1–18.
- Andrássy, I. (1961): Wissenschaftliche Ergebnisse der ersten ungarischen zoologischen Expedition in Ostafrika. 2. Nematoda. Annales historico-natura- les Musei nationalis hungarici, 53: 281–297.
- Andrássy, I. (1962): Neue Nematoden-Arten aus Ungarn. I. Zehn neue Arten der Unterklasse Secernentea (Phasmidia). Acta Zoologica Hungarica, 8: 1–23.
- Andrássy, I. (1962): Nematoden aus dem Psammon des Adige-Flusses, II. Memorie del Museo Civico di Storia Naturale di Verona, 10: 1–35.
- Andrássy, I. (1962): Über den Mundstachel der Tylenchinen. Nematologische Notizen, 9. Acta Zoologica Hungarica, 8: 241–249.
- Andrássy, I. (1962): Wiederfund einiger seltener Nematoden-Arten aus der Superfamilia Dorylaimoidea. Nematologische Notizen, 10. Annales Universitatis Scientiarum Budapestinensis de Rolando Eötvös Nominatae. Sectio biologica, 5: 3–11.
- Andrássy, I. (1962): Zwei neue Nematoden-Arten aus dem Überschwemmungs-gebiet der Donau. (Danubialia Hungarica, XIII.) Opuscula Zoologica Budapest, 4: 3–8.
- Andrássy, I. (1962): Nematologische Notizen, 12. Opuscula Zoologica Budapest, 4: 9–19.
- Andrássy, I. (1962): Neue Nematoden-Arten aus Ungarn, II. Fünf neue Arten der Überfamilie Dorylamoidea. Opuscula Zoologica Budapest, 4: 21–33.
- Andrássy, I. (1962): Nematoden aus dem Ufergrundwasser der Donau von Bratislava bis Budapest. (Danubialia Hungarica, XVII.) Archiv für Hydro- biologie, Supplement Donauforschung, 27: 91–117.
- Andrássy, I. (1963): Freilebende Nematoden aus Angola, I. Einige moosbewohnende Nematoden. Publicaçōes Culturais da Companhia de Diamantes de Angola, 66: 57–79.
- Andrássy, I. (1963): Nematologische Notizen, 12. Annales Universitatis Scientiarum Budapestinensis de Rolando Eötvös Nominatae. Sectio biologica, 6: 3–12.
- Andrássy, I. (1964): The zoological results of Gy. Topál's collectings in South Argentina. 2. Nematoda. Neue und einige seltene Nematoden-Arten aus Argentinien. Annales historico-naturales Musei nationalis hungarici, 55: 243–273.
- Andrássy, I. (1964): Süsswasser-Nematoden aus den grossen Gebirgsgegenden Ostafrikas. Acta Zoologica Hungarica, 10: 1–59.
- Andrássy, I. (1964): Ein Versuchsschlüssel zur Bestimmung der Tobrilus-Arten (Nematoda). Annales Universitatis Scientiarum Budapestinensis de Rolando Eötvös Nominatae. Sectio biologica, 7: 3–18.
- Andrássy, I. (1964): Dem Andenken Friedrich Paeslers. Opuscula Zoologica Budapest, 5: 3–8.
- Andrássy, I. (1964): Neue Nematoden-Arten aus Ungarn, III. Fünf neue Arten. Opuscula Zoologica Budapest, 5: 9–23.
- Andrássy, I. (1964): Onchulidae n. fam., eine neue Familie der Ordnung Enoplida (Nematoda). Opuscula Zoologica Budapest., 5: 25–41.
- Andrássy, I. (1964): Einige Bodennematoden aus der Mongolei. Ergebnisse der zoologischen Forschungen von Dr. Z. Kaszab in der Mongolei. Annales historico-naturales Musei nationalis hungarici, 56: 241–255.
- Andrássy, I. (1964): Einige Nematoden aus der Umgebung des Toten Meeres. Israel Journal of Zoology, 13: 89–97.
- Andrássy, I. (1965): Erd- und Süsswasser-Nematoden aus Ghana. Klasse Adenophorea (Aphasmidia). Opuscula Zoologica Budapest, 5: 127–151.
- Andrássy, I. (1965): Verzeichnis und Bestimmungsschlüssel der Arten der Nematodengattungen Criconemoides Taylor, 1936 und Mesocriconema n. gen. Opuscula Zoologica Budapest, 5: 153–171.
- Andrássy, I. (1966): Erd- und Süsswasser-Nematoden aus Ghana. Klasse Secernentea (Phasmidia). Annales Universitatis Scientiarum Budapestinensis de Rolando Eötvös Nominatae. Sectio biologica, 8: 5–24.
- Andrássy, I. (1966): Nematoden aus dem Grundschlamm des Mosoner Donauarmes. (Danubialia Hungarica, XXXIV.) Opuscula Zoologica Budapest, 6: 35–44.
- Andrássy, I. (1966): Zur Taxonomie der Gattungen Longidorella Thorne, 1939 und Enchodorella Khan, 1964 (Nematoda: Dorylaimidae). Opuscula Zoologica Budapest, 6: 45–67.
- Andrássy, I. (1966): Nematodes and their role in caves. Actas del primer coloquio latinoamericano de biologia del Suelo, 1965: 303–312.
- Andrássy, I. (1967): Die Unterfamilie Cephalobinae (Nematoda: Cephalobidae) und ihre Arten. Acta Zoologica Hungarica, 13: 1–37.
- Andrássy, I. (1967): Ergebnisse der zoologischen Forschungen von Dr. Z. Kaszab in der Mongolei. 92. Weitere Bodennematoden aus den Jahren 1964 und 1965. Opuscula Zoologica Budapest, 6: 203– 233.
- Andrássy, I. (1967): Nematoda. In. Illies, J. (Ed.) Limnofauna Europas, Gustav Fischer Verlag Stuttgart, p. 73–88.
- Andrássy, I., Balogh, J., Loksa, I., Mahunka, S. & Zicsi, A. (1967): The scientific results of the Hungarian soil zoological expedition to Chile, Argentina and Brasil. 12. Report on the collectings. Rovartani Közlemények, 20: 247–296.
- Andrássy, I., Balogh, J., Loksa, I., Mahunka, S. & Zicsi, A. (1967): Fauna Paraguayensis. 1. Report on the collectings. Rovartani Közlemények, 20: 297–308.
- Andrássy, I. (1967): Nematoden aus Chile, Argentinien und Brasilien gesammelt von Prof. Dr. H. Franz. Opuscula Zoologica Budapest, 7: 3–34.
- Andrássy, I. (1967): Nematoden aus interstitiellen Biotopen Skandinaviens, gesammelt von P . H. Enckell (Lund). 1. Nematoden aus der Uferregion des Vättern- und Torneträsk-Sees (Schweden). Opuscula Zoologica Budapest, 7: 3–36.
- Andrássy, I. (1968): Wissenschaftliche Ergebnisse der ungarischen zoologischen Expeditionen nach Tansanien. 12. Bodennematoden aus der III. Expedition. Acta Zoologica Hungarica, 14: 239–257.
- Andrássy, I (1968): The scientific results of the Hungarian soil zoological expedition to the Brazzaville-Congo. 31. Nematoden aus Grundwasser. Annales Universitatis Scientiarum Budapestinensis de Rolando Eötvös Nominatae. Sectio biologica, 9–10: 3–26.
- Andrássy, I. (1968): Fauna Paraguayensis. 2. Nema- toden aus den Galeriewäldern des Acaray-Flusses. Opuscula Zoologica Budapest, 8: 167–315.
- Andrássy, I (1969): Laposférgek (Platyhelminthes), hengeresférgek (Nemathelminthes), ormányüregesek (Nemertoidea), villásférgek (Aschelminthes), nyelesférgek (Camptozoa), gyűrűsférgek (Annelida). In. MÓCZÁR, L. (Ed.) Állathatározó. Tankönyvkiadó Budpaest, I: 35–83.
- Andrássy, I. (1969): Vier neue Bodennematoden- Arten. The scientific results of the Hungarian soil zoological expedition to the Brazzaville-Congo, 40. Opuscula Zoologica Budapest, 9: 15–29.
- Andrássy, I. (1969): Taxonomische Übersicht der Familien Prodorylaimidae n. fam. und Dorylaimidae de Man, 1876. Opuscula Zoologica Budapest, 9: 187–233.
- Andrássy, I. (1970): Einige neue Nematodenarten aus westafrikanischen Reisfeldern. Annales Universitatis Scientiarum Budapestinensis de Rolando Eötvös Nominatae. Sectio biologica, 123: 243–254.
- Andrássy, I. (1970): Freilebende Nematoden aus Vietnam. Opuscula Zoologica Budapest, 10: 5–31.
- Andrássy, I. (19710): Nematoden aus einigen Fluss-Systemen Südafrikas. Opuscula Zoologica Budapest, 10: 179–219.
- Andrássy, I. (1971): Különös jelenség: fonál- férgekben élősködő fonálférgek! [Strange phenomenon: Nematodes parasitizing nematodes] Állattani Közlemények, 58: 156–159.
- Andrássy, I. (1971): Freilebende Nematoden aus Angola, II. Über zwei Drepanodorylaimus-Arten. Publicaçōes Culturais da Companhia de Diamantes de Angola, 84: 49–54.
- Andrássy, I. (1971): Überprüfung einiger von Micoletzky beschriebener Nematodenarten an Hand der Typenpräparate. I. Mitteilungen aus dem Zoologischen Museum in Berlin, 47: 241–254.
- Andrássy, I. (1971): Die Nematodengattung Rhyssocolpus gen. n. und ihre Arten. Zoologischer Anzeiger, 187: 248–256.
- Andrássy, I. (1971): Zwei neue Arten der Familie Bunonematidae (Nematoda). Zoologischer Anzeiger, 187: 257–265.
- Andrássy, I. (1971): Nematoden aus dem Psammon des Oglio-Flusses. Memorie del Museo Civico di Storia Naturale di Verona, 19: 191–202.
- Andrássy, I. (1972): A Magyarországról eddig kimutatott szabadon élő fonálférgek (Nematoda) jegyzéke. Állattani Közlemények, 59: 161–171.
- Andrássy, I. (1972): Zwei neue Gattungen von Bodennematoden. Annales Universitatis Scientiarum Budapestinensis de Rolando Eötvös Nominatae. Sectio biologica, 14: 189–192.
- Andrássy, I. (1972): Zwei neue Arten der Nematodengattung Aulolaimus de Man, 1880. Annales Universitatis Scientiarum Budapestinensis de Rolando Eötvös Nominatae. Sectio biologica, 14: 193–201.
- Andrássy, I. (1973): In memoriam Dr. Endre Dudich (1895–1971). International Journal of Speleology, 5: 1–9.
- Andrássy, I. (1973): Nematoden aus Strand- und Höhlenbiotopen von Kuba. Acta Zoologica Hungarica, 19: 233–270.
- Andrássy, I. (1973): 100 neue Nematodenarten in der ungarischen Fauna. Opuscula Zoologica Budapest, 11: 7–48.
- Andrássy, I. (1973): Ein Meeresrelikt und einige andere bemerkenswerte Nematodenarten aus Neuguinea. Opuscula Zoologica Budapest, 12: 3–19.
- Andrássy, I. (1973): Plectus granulosus var. grandepapillatus Ditlevsen – ein älteres Synonym von Anaplectus submersus (Hirschmann) (Nematoda: Plectidae). Opuscula Zoologica Budapest, 12: 105– 106.
- Andrássy, I. (1973): Über vier homonyme Nematodengattungen. Nematologica, 19: 403–404.
- Andrássy, I. (1974): A Nematodák evolúciója és rendszerezése. [Evolution and classification of nematodes] A Magyar Tudományos Akadémia Biológiai Tudományok Osztályának Közleményei, 17: 13–58.
- Andrássy, I., (1976): Evolution as a basis for the systematization of nematodes. Pitman Publishing, Budapest – London – San Francisco – Melbourne, pp. 1–288.
- Andrássy, I. (1976): A nematológiai kutatások hazai úttörői: Örley László és Daday Jenő. [Pioneers of the Hungarian nematological researches: László Örley and Jenő Daday] Állattani Közlemények, 63: 219–224.
- Andrássy, I. (1976): Aglenchus costatus (de Man, 1921) Meyl, 1961. CIH Descriptions of Plant Parasitic Nematodes, 6(80): 1–2.
- Andrássy, I. (1977): Ergebnisse der zoologischen Forschungen von Dr. Z. Kaszab in der Mongolei. 356. Süsswasser- und Bodennematoden aus den Jahren 1967 und 1968. Opuscula Zoologica Budapest, 13: 3–24.
- Andrássy, I. (1977): Die Gattungen Amphidelus Thorne, 1939, Paramphidelus n. gen. und Etamphidelus n. gen. (Nematoda: Alaimidae). Opuscula Zoologica Budapest, 14: 2–43.
- Andrássy, I. (1977): Nematoda. In. Hurlbert, S. H. (Ed.) Biota acuática de Sudamérica Austral. San Diego State University, p. 73–79.
- Andrássy, I. (1977): Tylenchus davainei Bastian, 1865. CIH Descriptions of Plant Parasitic Nematodes, 7(97): 1–4.
- Andrássy, I. (1978): Nematoda. In. Illies, J. (Ed.) Limnofauna Europas, Gustav Fischer Verlag Stuttgart (2nd edition), p. 98–117.
- Andrássy, I. (1978): In Nematoden parasitierende Nematoden. Helminthologia, 14: 451–457.
- Andrássy, I. (1978): Bicirronema caledoniense n. gen., n. sp. and Amphidirhabditis longipapillata n. gen., n. sp. (Secernentia: Rhabditida), two remarkable soil-nematodes from New Caledonia. Revue de Nématolgie, 1: 257–263.
- Andrássy, I. (1978): Fresh-water nematodes from the Himalayas (Nepal). Opuscula Zoologica Budapest, 15: 3–21.
- Andrássy, I. (1979): The genera and species of the family Tylenchidae Örley, 1880 (Nematoda). The genus Tylenchus Bastian, 1865. Acta Zoologica Hungarica, 25: 1–33.
- Andrássy, I. (1979): Revision of the subfamily Criconematinae Taylor, 1936 (Nematoda). Opuscula Zoologica Budapest, 16: 11–57.
- Andrássy, I. (1979): Újabb harminc Nematoda faj a magyar faunában [Another 30 Nematoda species, new for the fauna of Hungary] Állattani Közlemények, 66: 213–216.
- Andrássy, I. (1980): The genera and species of the family Tylenchidae Örley, 1880 (Nematoda). The genera Aglenchus Andrássy, 1961, Miculenchus Andrássy, 1959, and Polenchus gen. n. Acta Zoologica Hungarica, 26: 1–20.
- Andrássy, I. (1980): Egy új Nematoda faj a Sashegy ről. [A new nematoda species from the Sas-hill, Budapest] Állattani Közlemények, 67: 119–121.
- Andrássy, I. (1981): The genera and species of the family Tylenchidae Örley, 1880 (Nematoda). The genus Malenchus Andrássy, 1968. Acta Zoologica Hungarica, 27: 1–47.
- Andrássy, I. (1981): Újabb megfigyelés fonálférgekben élősködő fonálférgekről. [New observation on the nematodes paratisitizing nematodes] Állattani Közlemények, 68: 123–126.
- Andrássy, I. (1981): Revision of the order Monhysterida (Nematoda) inhabiting soil and inland waters. Opuscula Zoologica Budapest, 17– 18: 13–47.
- Andrássy, I. (1981): Nematological notices. Opuscula Zoologica Budapest, 17–18: 185–189.
- Andrássy, I. (1982): Six new species of the suborder Rhabditina (Nematoda). Revue de Nématolgie, 5: 39–50.
- Andrássy, I. (1982): The genera and species of the family Tylenchidae Örley, 1880 (Nematoda). The genus Coslenchus Siddiqi, 1978. Acta Zoologica Hungarica, 28: 193–232.
- Andrássy, I. (1982): Újabb huszonöt Nematoda faj a magyar faunában. [Another 25 Nematoda species, new for the fauna of Hungary] Állattani Közlemények, 69: 139–146.
- Andrássy, I. (1983): A taxonomic review of the suborder Rhabditina (Nematoda: Secernentia). ORSTOM Paris, pp. 241.
- Andrássy, I. (1983): The free-living nematode fauna of the Hortobágy National Park. In. Mahunka, S. (Ed.) The fauna of the Hortobágy National Park. Akadémiai Kiadó Budapest, pp. 31–46.
- Andrássy, I. (1983): Caenorhabditis briggsae (Dougherty & Nigon, 1949) – a genetika egyik kísérleti állata (Nematoda: Rhabditidae).[ Caenorhabditis briggsae (Dougherty & Nigon, 1949) a model species for genetic researches] Állattani Közlemények, 70: 113–116.
- Andrássy, I. (19984): The genera and species of the family Tylenchidae Örley, 1880 (Nematoda). The genera Cephalenchus (Goodey, 1962) Golden, 1971 and Allotylenchus gen. n. Acta Zoologica Hungarica, 30: 1–28.
- Andrássy, I. (1984): Klasse Nematoda (Ordnungen Monhysterida, Desmoscolecida, Araeolaimida, Chromadorida, Rhabditida). In. Bestimmungsbücher zur Bodenfauna Europas, Akademie Verlag Berlin-Stuttgart, pp. 509.
- Andrássy, I. (1985): Gondolatok a Nematodák evolúciós rendszerezéséről. [Thoughts on the evolutionary classification of nematodes] Állattani Közlemények, 71: 7–11.
- Andrássy, I. (1985): Ismét huszonöt új Nematoda faj a magyar faunában. [Again 25 Nematoda species new for the fauna of Hungary] Állattani Közlemények, 71: 177–182.
- Andrássy, I. (1985): A dozen new nematode species from Hungary. Opuscula Zoologica Budapest, 19– 20: 3–39.
- Andrássy, I. (1985): Nematological notices, 2. Opuscula Zoologica Budapest, 19–20: 109–112.
- Andrássy, I. (1985): The genus Plectus Bastian, 1865 and its nearest relatives (Nematoda: Plectidae). Acta Zoologica Hungarica, 31: 1–52.
- Andrássy, I. (1985): On the genera Mononchus Bastian, 1865 and Prionchulus (Cobb, 1916) Wu & Hoeppli, 1929 (Nematoda: Mononchidae). Opuscula Zoologica Budapest, 21: 9–22.
- Andrássy, I. (1985): Three new species of Mononchoidea (Nematoda) from the Southern Hemisphere. Opuscula Zoologica Budapest, 21: 23–30.
- Andrássy, I. (1985): Paratylenchus microdorus Andrássy, 1959. CIH Descriptions of Plant Parasitic Nematodes, 107: 1–2.
- Andrássy, I. (1985): Scutylenchus quadrifer (Andrássy, 1954) Siddiqi, 1979. CIH Descriptions of Plant Parasitic Nematodes, 108: 1–2.
- Andrássy, I. (1986): Fifteen new nematode species from the Southern Hemisphere. Acta Zoologica Hungarica, 32: 1–33.
- Andrássy, I. (1986): Egy igazán különös fonálféreg. [A really strange nematode] Állattani Közlemények, 72: 145–150.
- Andrássy, I. (1986): The genus Eudorylaimus Andrássy, 1959 and the present status of its species (Nematoda: Qudsianematidae). Opuscula Zoologica Budapest, 22: 3–42.
- Andrássy, I. (1986): The genus Mesodorylaimus Andrássy, 1959 and its relatives (Nematoda: Dorylaimidae). Acta Zoologica Hungarica, 33: 207–261.
- Andrássy, I. (1987): Egy új tűfonálféreg faj Magyarországról: Paralongidorus rex sp. n. (Nematoda: Longidoridae). [A new needle-nematode species from Hungary: Paralongidorus rex sp. n.] Állattani Közlemények, 73: 115–118.
- Andrássy, I. (1987): The superfamily Dorylaimoidea (Nematoda) – a review. Families Thorniidae and Thornenematidae. Acta Zoologica Hungarica, 33: 277–315.
- Andrássy, I. (1987): The free-living nematode fauna of the Kiskunság National Park. In. Mahunka, S. (Ed.) The fauna of the Kiskunság National Park. Akadémiai Kiadó Budapest, pp. 15–46.
- Andrássy, I. (1988): Különös élősködők. [Strange parasites] Magyar Biológiai Társaság, Biológus Disputa előadásai Eger, 1987: 104–113.
- Andrássy, I. & Farkas, K. (1988): Kertészeti növények fonálféreg kártevői. Agro-nematológiai kézi- könyv. Mezőgazdasági Kiadó, Budapest, pp. 419.
- Andrássy, I., Farkas, K. & Jávor, I. (1988): Hengeresférgek (Nemathelminthes). In. Jermy, T. & Balázs, K. (Eds.) A növényvédelmi állattan kézikönyve. Akadémiai Kiadó Budapest, p. 7–147.
- Andrássy, I. (1988): The superfamily Dorylaimoidea (Nematoda) – a review. Family Dorylaimidae. Opuscula Zoologica Budapest, 23: 3–63.
- Andrássy, I. (1988): Egy új Tylolaimophorus faj (Nematoda) Magyarországon. Állattani Közlemények, 74: 183–186.
- Andrássy, I. (1988): Filenchus filipjevi sp. n. (Tylenchidae), a new soil inhabiting nematode species. Nematologiceskij sbornik Leningrad, pp. 25–29.
- Andrássy, I. (1989): Six new nematode species from South America. Acta Zoologica Hungarica, 35: 1– 16.
- Andrássy, I. (1989): További huszonöt Nematoda faj a magyar faunában. [Another 25 nematoda species new for the fauna of Hungary] Állattani Közlemények, 75: 143–145.
- Andrássy, I. (1990): Szabadon élő fonálférgek (Nematoda) a magyar faunában. [Free-living nematodes in the fauna of Hungary] Állattani Közlemények, 76: 17–38.
- Andrássy, I. (1990): The superfamily Dorylaimoidea (Nematoda) – a review. Family Qudsianematidae, I. Acta Zoologica Hungarica, 36: 163–188.
- Andrássy, I. (1991): The free-living nematode fauna of the Bátorliget Nature Reserve. In. Mahunka, S. (Ed.) The Bátorliget Nature Reserve – after forty years. Hungarian Natural History Museum Budapest, p. 129–197.
- Andrássy, I. (1992): A short census of free-living nematodes. Fundamental and Applied Nematology, 15: 187–188.
- Andrássy, I. (1992): A Balaton fonálféreg (Nematoda) faunájáról. [On the Nematoda fauna of the Balaton Lake] Állattani Közlemények, 77: 151–159.
- Andrássy, I. (1992): The superfamily Dorylaimoidea (Nematoda) – a review. Family Qudsianematidae, II. Opuscula Zoologica Budapest, 24: 3–55.
- Andrássy, I. (1992): A taxonomic survey of the family Mylonchulidae (Nematoda). Opuscula Zoologica Budapest, 25: 11–35.
- Andrássy, I. (1992): A census of genera and subgenera of free-living nematodes described ensuing
- Andrássy's book, 1976. Opuscula Zoologica Budapest, 25: 137–148.
- Andrássy, I. (1993): Néhány hazai tőzegmoha-láp fonálférgeiről (Nematoda). [On the nematodes of some Hungarian peat-bogs] Állattani Közlemények, 78: 9–19.
- Andrássy, I. (1993): A taxonomic survey of the family Mononchidae (Nematoda). Acta Zoologica Hungarica, 39: 13–60.
- Andrássy, I. (1993): A taxonomic survey of the family Anatonchidae (Nematoda). Opuscula Zoologica Budapest, 26: 9–52.
- Andrássy, I. (1995): A Balaton két Mesotheristus faja.[ The two Mesotheristus species of the Balaton Lake] Állattani Közlemények, 79: 3–14.
- Andrássy, I. (1995): A Balaton különös Eumonhystera faja (Nematoda: Monhysteridae). [The strange Eumonhystera species of the Balaton Lake] Állattani Közlemények, 80: 3–6.
- Andrássy, I. (1995): Tropical nematodes of rare genera (Dorylaimida). Opuscula Zoologica Budapest, 27–28: 5–24.
- Andrássy, I. (1996): Free-living nematodes in the Bükk Mountains, Hungary. In. Mahunka S. (Ed.) The fauna of the Bükk National Park. Hungarian Natural History Museum Budapest, p. 33–63.
- Andrássy, I. (1996): Tricaenonchus caucasius gen. et sp. n., a remarkable nematode species from the Caucasus (Nematoda: Mononchidae). Zoosystematica Rossica, 4: 19–21.
- Andrássy, I. (1997): Nematológiai kutatások a Balatonon. [Nematological researches of the Balaton Lake] Állattani Közlemények, 81: 169–175.
- Andrássy, I. (1997): Egy igazán ritka fonálféreg faj (Nematoda) a Balatonban. [A really rare nematoda species in the Balaton Lake] Állattani Közlemények, 81: 177–181.
- Andrássy, I. (1997): Nematodes from Ecuador. A new genus, four new and a known species (Dorylaimida). Opuscula Zoologica Budapest, 29–30: 3–19.
- Andrássy, I. (1998): The genus Boreolaimus gen. n. and its six species (Dorylaimida: Qudsianematidae), nematodes from the European Arctis. Fundamental and Applied Nematology, 21: 553–567.
- Andrássy, I. (1998): Nematodes in the Sixth Continent. Journal of Nematode Morphology and Systematics, 1: 107–186.
- Andrássy, I. (1999): A census of genera and subgenera of free-living nematodes. Journal of Nematode Morphology and Systematics, 2: 45–68.
- Andrássy, I. (1999): Fonálférgek (Nematoda) a Hévízi-tóban. [Nematodes in the Hévizi Lake] Állattani Közlemények, 82: 13–27.
- Andrássy, I. (1999): Kittydorylaimus gen. n. and Kolodorylaimus gen. n., two remarkable new genera of Dorylaimida (Nematoda). Opuscula Zoologica Budapest, 31: 3–15.
- Andrássy, I. (1999): Once more: the oesophageal gland nuclei in the dorylaimoid nematodes. Opuscula Zoologica Budapest, 31: 165–170.
- Andrássy, I. (2000): Some species of the genus Aporcelaimus Thorne et Sweanger, 1936 (Nema- toda: Dorylaimida) from Alaska. Annales Zoologici Warszawa, 50: 151–164.
- Andrássy, I. (2000): Four large-sized species of the family Aporcelaimidae (Nematoda, Dorylaimida) with proposal of a new genus, Epacrolaimus gen. n. Opuscula Zoologica Budapest, 32: 3–26.
- Andrássy, I. (2001): Some species of curious genera of the Class Penetrantia. International Journal of Nematology, 11: 43–57.
- Andrássy, I. (2001): A taxonomic review of the genera Aporcelaimus Thorne & Swanger, 1936 and Metaporcelaimus Lordello, 1965 (Nematoda, Aporcelaimidae). Opuscula Zoologica Budapest, 33: 7–47.
- Andrássy, I. (2001): On two uncommon structures in nematodes. Opuscula Zoologica Budapest, 33: 133–137.
- Loof, P. A. A., Andrássy, I., Luc, M., Raski, D. J., Siddiqi, M. R. & Wouts , W. M. (2001): Criconema Hofmänner & Menzel, 1914 (Nematoda): proposed designation of Eubostrichus guernei Certes, 1898 as the type species. Bulletin of Zoological Nomenclature, 58: 179–181.
- Andrássy, I. (2001): Some species of curious genera of the Class Secernentia. International Journal of Nematology, 11: 137–149.
- Andrássy, I. (2002): The genus Cristamphidelus Siddiqi & Vinciguerra, 1991 and a general survey of the family Alaimidae (Nematoda). Journal of Nematode Morphology and Systematics, 4: 51–82.
- Andrássy, I. (2002): Az Állattani Közlemények köszöntése. [Salutation of the Állattani Közlemények] Állattani Közlemények, 87: 7–8.
- Andrássy, I. (2002): Free-living nematodes from the Fertő-Hanság National Park, Hungary. In. Mahunka, S. (Ed.) The fauna of the Fertő-Hanság National Park. Hungarian Natural History Museum Budapest, p. 21–97.
- Andrássy, I. (2002): A Hévízi-tó fonálférgei (Nematoda) [Nematodes of the Hévizi Lake]. In. A Hévízi-forrástó ökológiai állapota [Ecological status of the Hévizi Lake]. Hévízi Könyvtár, 15: 80–84.
- Andrássy, I. (2002): New genera and species of nematodes from southern Chile. Opuscula Zoologica Budapest, 34: 5–22.
- Andrássy, I. (2002): On the genus Oriverutus Siddiqi, 1971 (Nematoda: Dorylaimida). Opuscula Zoologica Budapest, 34: 23–34.
- Andrássy, I. (2003): New and rare nematodes from Alaska. I. Three species of the family Plectidae. Journal of Nematode Morphology and Systematics, 5: 33–48.
- Andrássy, I. (2003): New and rare nematodes from Alaska. II. Four species of the order Mononchida. Journal of Nematode Morphology and Systematics, 5: 61–72.
- Andrássy, I. (2003): New and rare nematodes from Alaska. III. Five species of the order Dorylaimida. Journal of Nematode Morphology and Systematics, 5: 163–181.
- Andrássy, I.(2003): Three new species of Prismatolaimus de Man (Nematoda: Enoplida) possessing organellum dorsale, and systematics of the genus. International Journal of Nematology, 13: 123–134.
- Andrássy, I. (2003): Organellum dorsale, a peculiar small structure in the family Prismatolaimidae (Nematoda: Penetrantia). International Journal of Nematology, 135–138.
- Andrássy, I. (2004): Two new species of Aporcelaimellus Heyns, 1965 (Nematoda: Dorylaimida) from the tropics. Acta Zoologica Hungarica, 50: 97–107.
- Andrássy, I. (2005): The free-living nematode fauna of Hungary I. (Nematoda errantia). In. Csuzdi, CS. & Mahunka, S. (Eds.) Pedozoologia Hungarica, No. 3. Hungarian Natural History Museum Budapest, pp. 518
- ABEBE, E., Andrássy, I. & Traunspurger, W. (eds.) (2005). Freshwater nematodes: ecology and taxonomy. CABI Publishing, Wallingford, pp. 576.
- Abebe, E., Andrássy I., Traunspurger, W. (Eds.) (2006): Freshwater nematodes: ecology and taxonomy. CABI Publishing, Wellingford, pp. 752.
- Andrássy, I. (2006): Halomonhystera, a new genus distinct from Geomonhystera Andrássy, 1981 (Nematoda: Monhysteridae). Meiofauna Marina, 15:11–24.
- Andrássy, I. & Gibson, J. A. E. (2007): Nematodes from saline and freshwater lakes of the Vestfold Hills, East Antarctica, including the description of Hypodontolaimus antarcticus sp. n. Polar Biology, 30: 669–678.
- Andrássy, I. (2007): Contributions to the genus Opisthodorylaimus Ahmad & Jairajpuri, 1982 (Nematoda: Dorylaimida), with descriptions of two new species. Opuscula Zoologica Budapest, 36: 3–17.
- Andrássy, I. (2007): Free-living nematodes of Hungary. II. (Nematoda errantia.) In. Csuzdi, CS & Mahunka S. (Eds.) Pedozoologica Hungarica, No. 4. Hungarian Natural History Museum Budapest, pp. 496
- Andrássy, I. (2008): Two new and a known species of the family Tripylidae (Nematoda: Enoplida) from the tropics. Opuscula Zoologica Budapest, 37: 3–9.
- Andrássy I. (2008): Four new species of Mononchida (Nematoda) from tropical regions. Opuscula Zoologica Budapest, 38: 3–13.
- Andrássy, I. (2008): Eudorylaimus species (Nematoda: Dorylaimida) of continental Antarctica. Journal of Nematode Morphology and Systematics, 11: 49–66.
- Andrássy, I. (2008): On the male of the Antarctic nematode species, Plectus murrayi Yeates, 1970. Journal of Nematode Morphology and Systematics, 11: 87–89.
- Andrássy, I. (2009): Cerviconema cygneum and Papuadorus amplus, two new genera and species (Nematoda: Dorylaimida) from high altitude regions. Opuscula Zoologica Budapest, 40(1): 3–8.
- Andrássy, I. (2009): Another species of the genus Aporcelinus Andrássy, 2009 (Nematoda: Dorylaimida). Opuscula Zoologica Budapest, 40(2): 99–102.
- Andrássy, I. (2009): Free-living nematodes of Hungary III. (Nematoda errantia). In. Csuzdi, CS. & Mahunka, S. (eds.) Pedozoologica Hungarica, No. 5. Hungarian Natural History Museum Budapest, pp. 608.
- Andrássy, I. (2009): Free-living nematodes from Albania, including the description of three new species. Nematologia Mediterranea, 37: 73–88.
- Andrássy, I. (2009): Aporcelinus, a new genus of Aporcelaimoid nematodes (Dorylaimida), and its species. International Journal of Nematology, 19: 121–136.
- Andrássy, I. (2009): Addenda to “A census of genera and subgenera of free-living nematodes”. Journal of Nematode Morphology and Systematics, 12: 177–182.
- Andrássy, I. (2010): Two new Aporcelaimellus (Nematoda: Dorylaimida) from the Americas. Acta Zoologica Hungarica, 56(1): 1–8.
- Andrássy, I. (2010): Two new species of Dorylaimida (Nematoda) from the Mediterranean region. Acta Zoologica Hungarica, 56(3): 201–210.
- Andrássy, I. (2010): Two new nematode species of the subfamily Brittonematinae (Dorylaimida: Actinolaimidae). Opuscula Zoologica Budapest, 41(2): 175–190.
- Andrássy, I. (2011): Nematoda. In: Gerlach, J. (Ed.) Crustacea, Platyhelminthes, Nematoda, Annelida and Tardigrada of the Seychelles Islands. Manchester: Siri Scientific Press, pp. 15–57.
- Andrássy, I. (2011): On the nematode genus Heterodorus Altherr, 1952 (Dorylaimida: Nordiidae) with descriptions of three new species. Opuscula Zoologica Budapest, 42: 3–22.
- Andrássy, I. (2011): Three new bisexual species of Labronema Thorne, 1939 (Nematoda: Qudsianematidae). Opuscula Zoologica Budapest, 42(2): 107–120.
- Andrássy, I. (2011): Three new species of the genus Coomansus Jairajpuri & Khan, 1977 from the Southern Hemisphere (Nematoda: Mononchida). Journal of Nematode Morphology and Systematics, 14: 27–37.
- Andrássy, I. (2011): Three new species of the genus Mononchus (Nematoda: Mononchida), and the “real” Mononchus truncatus Bastian, 1865. Journal of Natural History, 45: 303–326.
- Andrássy, I. (2011): Two unusually slender nematode species of Trischistoma Cobb, 1913 (Enoplida: Trfipylidae). Nematology, 13: 561–567.
- Andrássy, I. (2012): On the “Paractinolaimus” genus group (Nematoda: Actinolaimidae), with description of five new and two rare species of Egtitus Thorne, 1967. Journal of Natural History, 46: 453–494.
- Andrássy, I. & Esquivel, A. (2012): Free-living nematodes from nature reserves in Costa Rica. Genera Egtitus Thorne, 1967 and Trachypleurosum Andrássy, 1959 (Dorylaimida: Actinolaimidae). Opuscula Zoologica Budapest, 43(1): 3–19.
- Andrássy, I. (2012): Two new species of the family Aporcelaimidae (Nematoda: Dorylaimida). Genus, 23(1): 189–199.
- Andrássy, I. (2012): Some large-sized species of the genus Amphidelus Thorne, 1939 (Nematoda: Alaimida). Journal of Nematode Morphology and Systematics, 15(1): 41–51.
