= Rajvinder Kaur Gill =

Canadian banker

- Born: 1971; Punjab, India
- Died: August 31, 2012 (aged 40); Sheikhupura, Lahore, Pakistan
- Occupation: banker
- Known for: mysterious disappearance

Rajvinder Kaur Gill was a Canadian banker who disappeared on a trip to Pakistan in August 2012.

== Biography ==
Newspapers from Pakistan identify Gill as a member of the Sikh religion. According to Gill's family, she was an immigrant to Canada.

Gill had worked for the Canadian Imperial Bank of Commerce until 2006, when she moved to Switzerland and worked for merchant bank firms Merrill Lynch, UBS and EFG Bank. Gill was reported to have resigned her job shortly before her final trip.

== Travel to Pakistan ==
Gill applied for a visa to Pakistan from Dubai on August 12, 2012. She flew into Lahore on August 25, 2012.

There are different theories about why Gill had gone to Pakistan, including to settle a long-standing debt, attend a conference, meet with a romantic interest, and look for and purchase precious gemstones. According to her sister, Gill had been participating on an online dating service, called Shaadi.com, and the real purpose of her trip was to meet one or more of her online romantic interests for the first time. The Pakistani newspaper The Nation reported that Gill possessed over $5 million USD at the time of her disappearance.

=== Disappearance ===
Gill's family reported that they had received text messages from Gill when she arrived in Pakistan and on August 26 and 27. They provided her cell phone records to the authorities demonstrating that the last message she sent was to the Pakistani television personality she had met through an online dating site.

However, several reports of the confession of one of the suspects in her murders have him describing picking Gill up at Lahore's airport, and driving her directly to the kill-site on August 25.

Tribune India reported she disappeared on August 31, after staying in three separate hotels and after meeting with "some unidentified people".

== Murder investigation ==
Gill's family reported her disappearance to Canadian officials, and they did their best to report her disappearance to Pakistani officials. Eventually, her father traveled to Pakistan so that he could make sure a satisfactory inquiry was conducted. According to the Express Tribune, Assistant Advocate General Arib Yaqoob filed a report with magistrates on December 6, 2012, which said that Gill was still not officially considered "missing".

On November 17, 2012, the Tribune India reported that Pakistan was going to initiate an inquiry after Gill's father Sikandar Singh requested help from Indian Punjab's Deputy Chief Minister Sukhbir Singh Badal, a distant relative. On November 29, 2012, Tribune India quoted a police official to the effect that "the possibility of Rajvinder being in the custody of intelligence agencies could not be ruled out."

There were two primary suspects: Hafiz Shahzad Hussain and Shahid Ghazanfar.

=== Hafiz Shahzad Hussain ===
Hafiz was apprehended and interrogated by Pakistan's Intelligence Bureau, and was reported to have given an account of her murder. According to the Pakistani officials, in that confession his cousin Shahid owed Gill a large sum of money, and offered to pay him for help killing her. He confessed they lured her on a car trip to view gems, where Shahid first covertly served Gill tea laced with a sedative, so she wouldn't struggle, and then strangled her. He confessed to helping dump her body in a rural canal. Hafiz had Gill's laptop when he was apprehended.

In 2017, a Pakistani court acquitted Hafiz Shahzad of Gill's murder due to lack of evidence against him.

=== Shahid Ghazanfar ===
Ghazanfar, the naturalized German citizen, was reported to have escaped to Germany.

On January 7, 2013, the Lahore High Court directed Pakistani police to call upon Interpol to seek out and arrest Ghazanfar and to request Canada and Switzerland to freeze Gill's bank accounts. The police confirmed that one of the suspect's aliases was Karishna Roy.

As of March 1, 2013, Ghazanfar is in the custody of German police. On November 6, 2024, a trial against the accused began at the Cologne Regional Court in Germany. The trial is taking place in Cologne because the accused last lived there. The prosecution is alleging murder, which the accused denies having committed. In 2017, the Toronto Sun had reported that Ghazanfar was facing trial in Canada.
