= Johnny Munkhammar =

Swedish political writer (1974–2012)

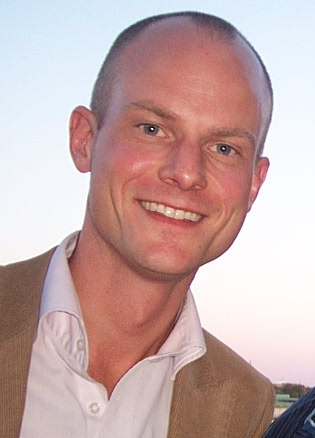
Johnny Munkhammar

Johnny Mattias Munkhammar (24 September 1974 – 13 August 2012) was a Swedish political writer and blogger.

He was an entrepreneur and author of several books. Until he died, he was a member of parliament in Sweden for the Moderate Party.

Previously, he worked for the free market think tank Timbro. He previously worked as a senior adviser at the Confederation of Swedish Enterprise.

Munkhammar was born in Hultsfred in Kalmar County, but grew up in Visby on Gotland. He received a master's degree in political sciences from Uppsala University in 1998. He has worked as an editorial writer at papers such as Nerikes Allehanda och Gotlands Tidningar.

Munkhammar was a board member of the Liberal Youth of Sweden, the youth wing of the Liberal People's Party, from 1996 to 1999. He ran as a candidate for the party in the 1995 and 1999 elections to the European Parliament. During the 2003 euro referendum in Sweden he was a leading campaigner on the pro-euro side.

Munkhammar expressed support to work politically for personal liberty, a free economy, open borders and limited government.

He died of adenoid cystic cancer on 13 August 2012 at the age of 37.

== Bibliography ==
- European Dawn: After the Social Model (Timbro, 2005).
- The guide to reform: How policymakers can pursue real change, achieve great results and win re-election (Timbro, 2007), ISBN 978-0-255-36618-2.
