= Hjalte Rasmussen =

Law professor (1940–2012)

Hjalte Rasmussen (18 December 1940 – 9 August 2012) was Professor of European Union Law at the University of Copenhagen. Previously he was a professor of law at the Law Department of the Copenhagen Business School and a visiting professor at the College of Europe, at Bruges.

For his 70th birthday, a liber amicorum was published under the title "Europe. The New Legal Realism – Essays in Honour of Hjalte Rasmussen", (2010) edited by Henning Koch, Karsten Hagel-Sørensen, Ulrich Haltern and Joseph H.H. Weiler.

His doctoral thesis "On Law and Policy in the European Court of Justice. A Comparative Study in Judicial Policymaking" was a ground-breaking critique of the European Court of Justice as policy-maker and was fiercely controversial. It was the first academically respectable book to question the Court's embrace of judicial activism in seeking to further European integration.

The eminent British scholar Professor Paul Beaumont states: "The academic community of scholars interested in European Law owes a debt to Hjalte Rasmussen for his willingness to break out of the general mould of eulogising the Court of Justice in his controversial book in 1986. Judges are not democratically accountable and therefore their actions must be held to account by the small group of people who have the time and the training to follow their work closely. Criticism of the Court should be accepted as normal, especially by members of the Court. If the Court is acting properly its judgments and its apologists will have answers for their critics. Rasmussen may have had little to do with the Court's greater self-restraint in the 1990s but it is a welcome development. He is absolutely right to insist that the future direction of the European Union should be determined by its peoples in intergovernmental conferences and in the legislative process not by judicial rewriting of the words of the EC Treaty to conform to the Court's view of the meaning of the vague and inconclusive objectives of the Union set out at the beginning of the EC Treaty."

He was a member of the Norwegian Academy of Science and Letters.
