= Katsumi Yamauchi =

Japanese politician

- 山内 克巳

Mayor of Iwata
- In office 28 August 1966 – 27 August 1986
- Preceded by: Seiji Ota
- Succeeded by: Akira Kamiya

Personal details
- Born: 22 October 1911
- Died: 16 August 2012 (aged 100)

Katsumi Yamauchi (山内 克巳, Yamauchi Katsumi; 22 October 1911 – 16 August 2012) was a Japanese politician. He was the mayor of Iwata, Shizuoka. He died in August 2012 of natural causes at the age of 100.
