= Tayseer al-Mashhadani =

Iraqi politician

Tayseer Najeh Awad al-Mashhadani (died 18 August 2012) was an Iraqi politician. She was elected to the National Assembly of Iraq in December 2005 as part of the Sunni Arab-led Iraqi Accord Front. She was an engineer by profession and a member of the Iraqi Islamic Party.

On 1 July 2007, she was abducted with 8 of her bodyguards at a checkpoint in the neighbourhood of Shaab in Eastern Baghdad. Her party accused members of the Muqtada as-Sadr militia of being behind the abduction, and the Sadrist warlord Abu Dereh has also been accused. After being held for nearly two months, she was released on 26 August.

She was married to the politician Hisham al-Hayali, and they had four children. The couple were killed in a car crash.
