= Viredo Espinosa =

Cuban artist

- Born: October 14, 1928; Regla, Cuba
- Died: August 26, 2012 (aged 83); Costa Mesa, CA
- Movement: Afro-Cuban Art / Abstract Expresionism
- Spouse: Alicia Espinosa

Viredo Espinosa (14 October 1928 – 26 August 2012) was a Cuban Abstract Expressionist artist. He was a member of the Cuban art collective known as Los Once. Alongside Los Once, Viredo brought abstract styles to Cuban art that had previously only been seen in Europe or the US. Viredo's works include paintings, engravings, murals, and more.

Viredo spent his early artist years in Regla, Cuba before fleeing to the United States to escape the Revolutionary regime.

== Biography ==
Viredo was born in 1928 in Regla, a small town across the bay from Havana. He attended San Alejandro art school, founded in 1818.

In 1952 he was invited to exhibit at the Sociedad Nuestro Tiempo in the show entitled, "Fifteen Young Painters and Sculptors". Only eleven artists ultimately showed work and the art critic Joaquin Texidor, in a favorable review in "Tiempo en Cuba", referred to the exhibitors as "The Group of Eleven" (Grupo de los Once), a name that followed the young artists for the rest of their careers. Other artists in Los Once include Agustín Cárdenas and Hugo Consuegra. The group's influence is generally considered to be significant as they introduced a new international style to Cuban art at mid century, particular abstract and non-figurative art.

In 1965, Viredo decided that he and his wife must leave Cuba due to the political situation. In February 1969, he saw Cuba for the last time as his plane departed for Miami.

Viredo's residency in Miami was short. He participated in local galleries and continued painting. In 1972, he moved to California and continued his work. Within 5 years he was able to do painting full-time, with Cuba as his subject matter. Viredo worked within the Cuban community, designed for the Cuban American Scholarship fund and donated art to raise money for charity. In the late 1990s and early 2000s he began receiving awards, like "La Palma Espinada" from the Cuban American Cultural Institute.

On August 26, 2012, Viredo died of vascular disease at a Costa Mesa nursing facility at the age of 83. He is survived by his wife, Alicia.

== Recent exhibits ==
=== Solo ===
- 2007: "Homage to Mondrian" - Old Town Gallery, Tustin, California
- 2008: John Wayne Airport Exhibit - Orange County, California
- 2010: "Viredo - Music, Myth, and Memory" - Old Town Gallery, Tustin, California

=== Group ===
- 2004: "The 'Human' Figure" - Alex Hailey Gallery, Gardena, California
- 2006: "Featured Artist Viredo" - Bear Street Gallery, Santa Ana, California
