= Robert B. Gaither =

American mechanical engineer

Robert B. (Bob) Gaither (August 12, 1929 – August 18, 2012) was an American mechanical engineer, professor and chairman of the department of mechanical engineering at the University of Florida College of Engineering, and the 100th president of the American Society of Mechanical Engineers in the year 1981-82.

Born in Ontario, Canada, Gaither attended Curtis High School, and obtained his BSc at Auburn University in 1951. After serving in the US Navy as bomb disposal officer on a destroyer for 3.5 years, he obtained his MS in 1957 and his PhD in 1962 in mechanical engineering at the University of Illinois. Gaither served his further career from 1962 to 1992 as professor and chairman of the department of mechanical engineering at University of Florida College of Engineering. In the year 1981-82 he served as president of the American Society of Mechanical Engineers.

In 1981 the University of Illinois awarded him a Distinguished Alumni Award, and in 1993 the American Society for Engineering Education awarded him a Centennial Medallion.

== Selected publications ==
- Ernest T. Smerdon, and Robert B. Gaither, "Using Technology to Solve Environmental Problems," in: Serial Information: Engineering Issues: Journal of Professional Activities, 1974, Vol. 100, Issue 4, Pg. 273-288
