= Steven Smith Mijiga =

Steven Smith Mijiga (1938- August 31, 2012) was the first Malawian Post Master General in Malawi He is credited for introducing television to Malawi, Kanjedza satellite dishes, solar panels and cellphones to Malawi. He was Chief Executive of the Malawi Posts and Telecommunications in the 1990s. He is survived by 8 children.
