= Doug Dench =

Australian rules footballer

Personal information
- Full name: Douglas A. Dench
- Born: 29 January 1930
- Died: 19 August 2012 (aged 82)
- Original teams: Doutta Stars, Redan
- Height: 174 cm (5 ft 9 in)
- Weight: 75 kg (165 lb)
- Positions: Half-back, back pocket

Playing career^{1}
Years	Club	Games (Goals)
1955–56	Essendon	27 (0)
- ^{1} Playing statistics correct to the end of 1956.

Doug Dench (29 January 1930 – 19 August 2012) was an Australian rules footballer who played with Essendon in the Victorian Football League (VFL). He won a reserves premiership with Essendon in 1950 and was the reserves best and fairest player in 1954. Dench was cleared to Victorian Football Association side Williamstown in 1957, but did not end up playing a match for them.
