= Hisham al-Hayali =

Iraqi politician (died 2012)

Governor of Diyala Governorate
- In office 9 March 2012 – 18 August 2012
- Succeeded by: Omar Abdul Aziz al-Hamiri

Personal details
- Died: 18 August 2012 Kalar road between the Diyala and Sulaimaniya provinces of Iraq
- Party: White Iraqiya Bloc

Hisham al-Hayali (died 18 August 2012) was governor of Iraq's Diyala Governorate from March to August 2012 when he was killed in a car crash. His wife, former MP Tayseer al-Mashhadani, died in the same crash. Their funeral was conducted on August 19, 2012, at 10 am.
