= Hagström (disambiguation) =

Hagström, Häggström, Hagstrom and Haggstrom are surnames of Swedish origin which may refer to:

== Hagström ==
- Albin Hagström (1905–1952), Swedish accordion manufacturer
- Annika Hagström (born 1942), Swedish journalist, singer, and author
- Emil Hagström (1893–1941), Swedish sailor who competed in the 1912 Olympics
- Göte Hagström (1918–2014), Swedish athlete who competed mainly in the 3000 metre steeplechase
- Johanna Hagström, (born 1998), Swedish cross-country skier
- Mårten Hagström (born 1971), Swedish musician
- Peter Hagström (born 1967), Swedish former professional ice hockey player
- Stig Hagström (1932–2011), Swedish professor emeritus in materials science and engineering at Stanford University
- Sven Hagströmer (born 1943), Swedish businessman and co-founder of Hagströmer & Qviberg

== Häggström ==
- Johan Häggström (born 1992), Swedish cross-country skier
- Nils Häggström (1885–1974), Swedish modern pentathlete who competed in the 1912 Summer Olympics
- Per Häggström (1971–1996), Swedish murder victim
- Peter Häggström (born 1976), Swedish athlete who competed in the long jump
- Olle Häggström (born 1967), Swedish professor of mathematical statistics

== Companies ==
- Hagström, a Swedish manufacturer of musical instruments
  - Hagström H8, a mass-produced eight-stringed bass guitar
  - Hagström Jimmy, an archtop jazz guitar built by Hagström and Jimmy D'Aquisto
  - Hagström HJ-500 and Hagström HJ-600, reissues of the Hagström Jimmy
  - Hagström Swede Patch 2000, world's first guitar/synthesizer hybrid
  - Hagström Viking, Hagström's first semi-acoustic guitar
- Hagstrom Map, a mapmaker specializing in the New York City metropolitan region

== Other ==
- "Haggstrom", a song from the album Minecraft – Volume Alpha by C418

== See also ==
- Hagströmer & Qviberg, a Swedish finance and banking corporation
