= List of Hagström users =

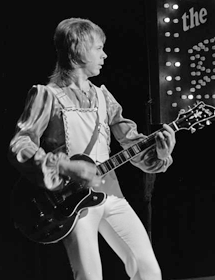
Björn Ulvaeus of ABBA playing a Hagström Swede on The Eddy-Go-Round Show, 1975

This is a list of musicians who are either high profiled and/or have a long and faithful history of playing Hagström instruments, both of the original run in Sweden and of the current re-issues sold under the Hagström name.

== A-G ==
- Mark Arm of the American grunge band Mudhoney plays a Hagström F-model.
- Tim Armstrong of punk band Rancid plays three Hagström Vikings in red, black and pink finishes.
- Nicole Atkins
- Richard Bennet who have played with Mark Knopfler, Neil Diamond and many others plays a 1959 Hagström De Luxe.
- David Bowie played a 12 string acoustic and a red Hagström Kent with matching headstock during the Ziggy Stardust era. The red Hagström Kent can be seen in the Rebel Rebel music video.
- Carla Bozulich of Geraldine Fibbers, Scarnella, Evangelista etc. claims two 66 acoustic models are her "obsession," and she played a red electric model in "every Geraldine Fibbers show for five years" (it also "featured heavily in Scarnella." Some of her Hagströms were put up for sale in late 2011 and early 2012.
- Bob Casale of DEVO can be seen playing a red Hagstrom Kent in the (I Can't Get Me No) Satisfaction music video
- Larry Coryell played a Swede and Super Swede during 70's era.
- Kurt Cobain frontman of grunge band Nirvana owned both a blue Swede model and a right-handed Hagström II, but these were rarely used in live performances.
- Guy Davis played a H22 acoustic guitar and was used in promotional material in the 1970s.
- Julie Doiron, Juno Award-winning solo musician and former collaborator with The Tragically Hip, plays exclusively a Hagström Super Swede.
- One of Kiss guitarist Ace Frehley's first ever guitars was a Hagström.
- Mathias Färm of Swedish skate punk band Millencolin plays Hagström guitars.
- Billy Gibbons and Dusty Hill of ZZ Top has been seen on photo shoots both with Hagström instruments, but it is unknown if they have been used live or during recordings.
- Dave Gregory the lead guitarist of XTC and later a sessions player used a Hagström Futurama II.
- Multi instrumentalist David Grubbs is known to have played a Hagström Viking and Swede.
- Rutger Gunnarsson (ABBA) played and designed the Hagström Super Swede Bass

== H-N ==
- Steve Harris of Gary Numan used a Viking live on various tours
- Steve Hackett of Genesis has been known to play Hagström BJ12 acoustic guitar on the song "Supper's Ready" in 1973.
- Bob Hardy, bassist of the Scottish band Franz Ferdinand.
- Jimi Hendrix played an eight stringed Hagström bass purchased in 1967 (apparently the sixth ever made), Jimi used during a jam session with Curtis Knight and the Squires and can be heard on the album "Summer of Love Sessions".
- PJ Jackson of the 4th Street Band plays a 1969 Hagström F400.
- Singer, guitarist, and songwriter Colin James has been known to play Hagström guitars.
- Billy Karren of pioneering riot grrrl punk band Bikini Kill often used a Hagström II on stage and in the studio.
- Mike Krol consistently plays a Hagström H-III on stage and in studio across all four of his albums.
- Damian Kulash guitarist of OK Go plays an Ultra Viking and several other Hagström guitars.
- Andy Kulberg bassist of the short-lived psychedelic rock band Blues Project used a H8 and was also used in Hagström's promotional material.
- King Gizzard & the Lizard Wizard lead singer and songwriter Stu Mackenzie plays a black Hagström F-12, and has used it on a multitude of the bands albums.
- Nick McCarthy of Franz Ferdinand plays a vintage Hagström P46 guitar.
- Danny McCulloch bass player of The Animals was listed as a Hagström H8 user in promotional material from Hagström Guitars.
- Frances McKee of The Vaselines currently uses a Hagström Viking II as her main guitar.
- Randy Meisner of the Eagles played a vintage red Hagström II bass and a sunburst F400 bass, early in the band's career.
- Micky Moody former guitarist of Whitesnake plays a Super Swede and a Deluxe 2H guitar.
- Bill Nelson was one of a very few to master the complicated Hagström Swede Patch 2000 a guitar/keyboard hybrid and was also used in promotional material
- Aaron North lead guitarist for Nine Inch Nails, Jubilee and The Icarus Line is known to own over 20 different vintage Hagströms. He can be seen playing a white Hagström III in the Nine Inch Nails music video for "The Hand That Feeds", and a red Hagström III in The Icarus Line music videos for "Up Against The Wall..." and "Feed A Cat To Your Cobra".
- Tim Nordwind of OK Go just like his bandmate plays Hagström guitars.
- Stephen Murphy of British post punk band Gods Gift used a sunburst Hagstrom Super Swede

== O-Z ==
- Erik Ohlsson plays Hagström guitars just like his bandmate Mattias Färm in Millencolin.
- Kevin Parker has used a Hagström Impala for recording and live performances
- Joe Perry of Aerosmith used a vintage Hagström on "Honkin' On Bobo" from 2004.
- Alden Penner of The Unicorns and Clues played a red Hagström IIN OT electric guitar and a IIB N bass.
- Michel Polnareff owned one or two Hagström H33E, both with glued neck. His first guitar was one of these!
- Elvis Presley played a Hagström Viking DeLuxe during his 68 Comeback Special and later purchased several more Vikings. Hagström used photos of Elvis and the Viking for promotional reasons but had to withdraw the campaign after being contacted by Presley's management.
- Noel Redding of The Jimi Hendrix Experience played eight string bass donated to him by Hagström when they visited Gothenburg, the bass was used on one the songs "Spanish Castle Magic", "You've got me Floating" and "Little miss Lover" from the 1967 albumsAxis Bold As Love.
- Ryan Ross guitarist of Panic! at the Disco is endorsed by Hagström and plays Hagström Swede models.
- Mike Rutherford of Genesis played an eight stringed Hagström bass on "i know what I like". When asked about the somewhat odd choice of instrument Rutherford replied People have this thing about these being the guitars to use and those ones not. I go purely on sound. Like acoustics. Everyone raves about Gibson acoustics. I think they're rubbish....
- Peter Peter aka Peter Schneidermann of Sort Sol and Sods exclusively played a vintage red Hagström Kent III.
- Bob Seger has been known to have played a Hagström Swede in the mid-1970s.
- Henrik Schyffert Swedish comedian and guitarist of Whale played a red vintage Hagström Super Swede with matching headstock.
- Pat Smear guitarist of Nirvana, Foo Fighters and the Germs has played Hagström exclusively throughout his career and is known to have one of the biggest vintage collections of Hagströms in the USA.
- St. Vincent occasionally plays a 1970s Hagström Super Swede, particularly on the song "Surgeon"
- Cat Stevens played a Hagström BJ12 and H33 acoustic guitars during live performances and recordings.
- Mike Stroud (musician) plays a Hagström in the band Ratatat.
- Daryl Stuermer played a Swede and Super Swede during 70's while with Jean-Luc Ponty, and later occasionally with Genesis.
- Björn Ulvaeus, guitarist of ABBA, played several different Hagström models from the original Swedish production, including one of the guitars with custom blue and yellow graphics. Hagström also supplied ABBA with the PA-system on their first international tour.
- Kevin Wease of the Triple Threat Band West Virginia US. Plays a 1966 Hagstrom Swede Bass. listed in Hagstrom UK.
- Jim Yester of the Association played a Hagstrom Viking I at the Monterey Pop Festival
- Frank Zappa played a Hagström Viking, a Swede Patch 2000, H12 electric and an 8-string bass as well as promote the Hagström brand through his advertising agency "Nifty Tough & Bitchin" featuring himself in many of the ads.
- Dweezil Zappa of Zappa Plays Zappa plays a Viking just like his father Frank Zappa.
