= Westher =

Westher is a surname. Notable people with the surname include:

- Erling Westher (1903–1986), Norwegian pianist and educator
- Paula Westher (born 1965), Swedish cyclist
- Karin Westher (born 1944), Norwegian pianist
