= Albin Hagström Memorial Award =

The Albin Hagström Memorial Award (Swedish: Albin Hagströms Minnespris) was a prize that was awarded between 1997 and 2006 by the Royal Swedish Academy of Music in memory of Albin Hagström, a well-known accordionist and accordion maker from Älvdalen and the founder of the Hagström company.

The award was given to an accordionist or guitarist, and the prizewinner was selected by the Kärstin Hagström-Heikkinen Music Award Fund.

Since 2007, several scholarships have been awarded to accordionists and guitarists in popular music. The applicant cannot be older than 35 and must be a Swedish citizen. The scholarships are only awarded to individuals.

== List of recipients ==
- 2006: Arnstein Johansen
- 2005: Lasse Wellander
- 2004: Olav Wernersen
- 2003: Kenny Håkansson
- 2002: Sone Banger
- 2001: Georg Wadenius
- 2000: Lasse Holm
- 1999: Janne Schaffer
- 1998: Sören Rydgren
- 1997: Rune Gustafsson
