= Frank Cook (Norwegian musician) =

- Born: March 25, 1924; Oslo, Norway
- Died: August 13, 1982 (aged 58)
- Occupations: Jazz musician, band leader

Frank Robert Cook (March 25, 1924 – August 13, 1982) was a Norwegian jazz musician and band leader.

Cook was born in Oslo, the son of Axel Brynjulf Christensen Cook (1886–1927) and Ingeborg Alma Cook (née Isaksen, 1888–1982). He was known for his performances in the 1950s with Nora Brockstedt, Per Asplin, Lillian Harriet, and Frank Ottersen, in Rowland Greenberg's quintets and the Carsten Klouman Trio, as well as in his own ensemble, Frank Cook's Orkester, where he played bass together with vocalists such as Anders Saus and Per Müller.

Cook made recordings with Sverre Cornelius Lund and Arnstein Johansen in the 1960s, and he appeared on NRK with Kjell Halvorsen (piano) and Bjørn Krokfoss (drums) from 1967 onward. He wrote the film score for Gylne ungdom (1956) and contributed to the volume Toner fra tigerstaden: musikk, mennesker og miljø fra Oslos revyliv 1905–78 (Tones from Tiger Town: Music, People, and the Ambiance of Oslo's Cabaret Life, 1905–78; Fabritius, 1979). His band participated in recordings with artists such as Britt Langlie, Wenche Myhre, and Jan Høiland, and it was a fixture in the early episodes of Roald Øyen's television program Bit for bit, bilde for bilde.

Frank Cook is buried at Vestre Gravlund in Oslo. Frank was the brother of the singer and actress Ingeborg Cook.
