= Oddvar Nygaard =

Norwegian musician and composer

Oddvar Nygaard (July 23, 1919 – April 21, 1985) was a Norwegian accordionist and composer.

Nygaard was born in Hundorp in Sør-Fron Municipality. His first recording was made in 1942, and his teachers included the accordionist Ottar E. Akre. Together with the fiddler Ola Opheim, he was one of the most important Norwegian folk musicians in the decades after the Second World War. With his ensemble, the Oddvar Nygaard Quartet (Oddvar Nygaards kvartett), he recorded 24 albums between 1964 and 1985. In addition to Nygaard himself on accordion, the quartet consisted of Ola Opheim on fiddle, Finn Westbye on guitar, and Håkon Nilsen on bass.

The quartet won the 1973 Spellemannprisen contest in the category of folk music and old-fashioned dance, which was awarded for the first time that year. In 1976, Nygaard and Opheim won the Vågå Award (Vågåfatet).

Nygaard made several hundred recordings and had many performances on both radio and TV. He collaborated with musicians such as Oscar Skau, Sven Nyhus, Rolf Syversen, and Børt Erik Thoresen, and with the skier Ole Ellefsæter. He composed about 170 of his own works. In 1995, the record company EMI released the catalog album Spelemannsliv (A Musician's Life) with selections from Nygaard's career.
