= Sverre Cornelius Lund =

Norwegian accordion player (1931–2012)

Sverre Cornelius Lund (December 9, 1931 – October 21, 2012) was a Norwegian accordionist known from his radio broadcasts and album releases.

In the 1960s, Lund released several albums, including collaborations with Frank Cook and Arnstein Johansen. Later he played with the Norwegian Radio Orchestra and the Stavanger Ensemble. He was one of the founders of the Norwegian Accordionists' Association and thirty other local clubs, including in Narvik, where he occasionally resided. In Oslo he ran the company S. C. L. Music for several decades. He created the designs for the Cornelli Gold and Excelsior Tosca accordions.

Lund was the father of the singer Geir Cornelius Lund (1963–2008) and the mezzo-soprano Elisabeth Cornelius Lund (1957–). He lived in Costa del Sol. Lund died on October 21, 2012, and was buried at Håkvik Chapel in Narvik on November 6 the same year.

== Awards and recognitions ==
- Honorary member of the Norwegian Accordionists' Association
- Vågå Award (Vågåfatet), 1996, shared with Arnstein Johansen
