= Teisco =

Japanese musical instrument manufacturer & brand

- Formerly: Aoi Onpa Kenkyūjo (1946); Nippon Onpa Kōgyō Co. (1956); Teisco Co. (1964); Teisco Shōji (1967–early 1970s)
- Type: Private
- Industry: Musical instruments
- Founded: 1946
- Founder: Atswo Kaneko and Doryo Matsuda
- Defunct: 1967, revived in 2018
- Fate: Company ceased in 1967, when the brand was acquired by Kawai
- Headquarters: Tokyo, Japan
- Area served: Worldwide
- Products: Electric guitars, classical guitars labeled Aquarius, synthesizers, drum kits, guitar amplifiers (1946–67); Effects units (2018–)
- Brands: Teisco
- Parent: BandLab Technologies
- Website: teisco.com

Teisco was a Japanese musical instrument manufacturing company from 1948 until 1967, when the brand "Teisco" was acquired by Kawai (河合楽器製作所; Kawai Gakki Seisakusho). The company produced guitars as well as synthesizers, microphones, guitar amplifiers and drum kits. Teisco products were widely exported to the United States and the United Kingdom.

In 2018, the brand "Teisco" was relaunched –along with former guitar company Harmony– by Singaporean music company BandLab Technologies to produce effects units.

== Company history ==
Teisco logo in Japan

Teisco Del Rey brand logo, re-badged in the US after 1964.

The brand name "Teisco" was established in 1948, and sometimes incorrectly explained as an acronym of Tokyo Electric Instrument and Sound Company. However, the exact name of company establishing and producing the Teisco brand was not that name, and rather, they had frequently renamed their company.

The company was founded in 1946 by Hawaiian and Spanish guitarist Atsuwo Kaneko and electrical engineer Doryu Matsuda. The company was originally called Aoi Onpa Kenkyujo (roughly: Hollyhock Soundwave or Electricity Laboratories). In 1956, the company name was changed to Nippon Onpa Kogyo Co., and changed to Teisco Co. in 1964. In 1967, the company was acquired by Kawai Musical Instruments Manufacturing Co. Ltd. (河合楽器製作所; Kawai Gakki Seisakusho), who discontinued the Teisco brand name for guitars in 1969 (1977 in Japan), but continued to use it for electronic keyboards until the 1980s.

== Products ==
=== Guitars ===
Similar designs

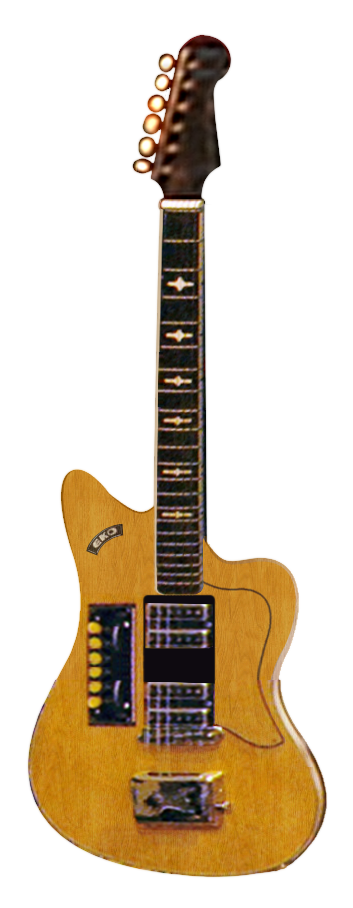
Eko (1960–62)

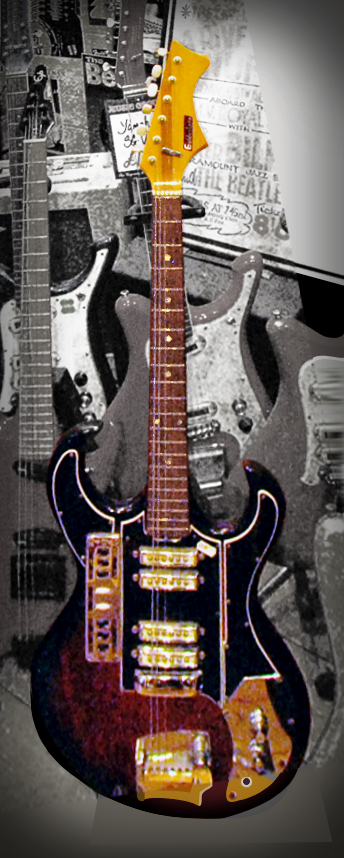
Ibanez (1960s)

Teisco guitars were imported to the United States since 1959 or early 1960, and then re-badged as "Teisco Del Rey" after 1964. From 1948 to the early 1960s Teisco products often, like many Japanese products of the period, shared several designs with American and Western European products of the time including Hagström and EKO.

However, in the early 1960s Teisco products became increasingly unique. Teisco guitars became notable for unusual body shapes, such as the May Queen design resembling an artist's palette, or other unusual features such as having four pickups (most guitars have two or three). The vast amount of controls; typically an individual switch for each pickup, plus a tone or phase inversion switch, along with as many as five tone and volume knobs gave a wide variety of sounds yet were easily switched while playing.

Original designs

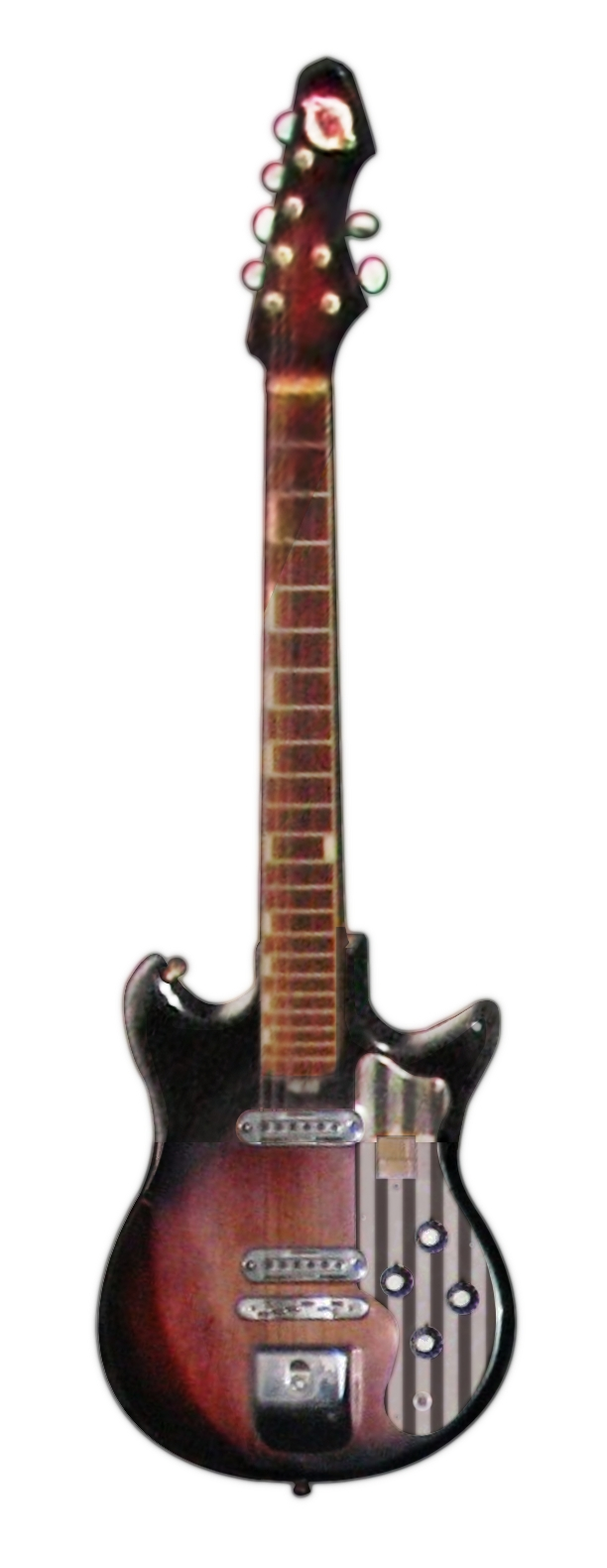
Teisco MJ-2L (1963/65)

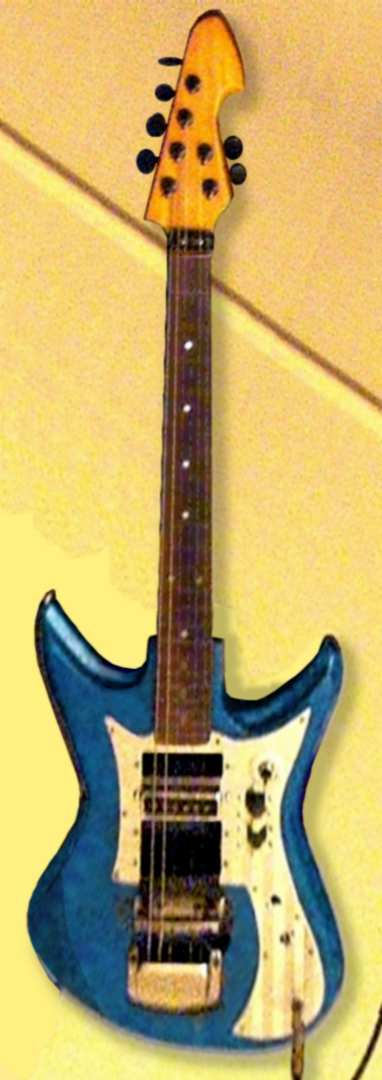
K4L (1966)

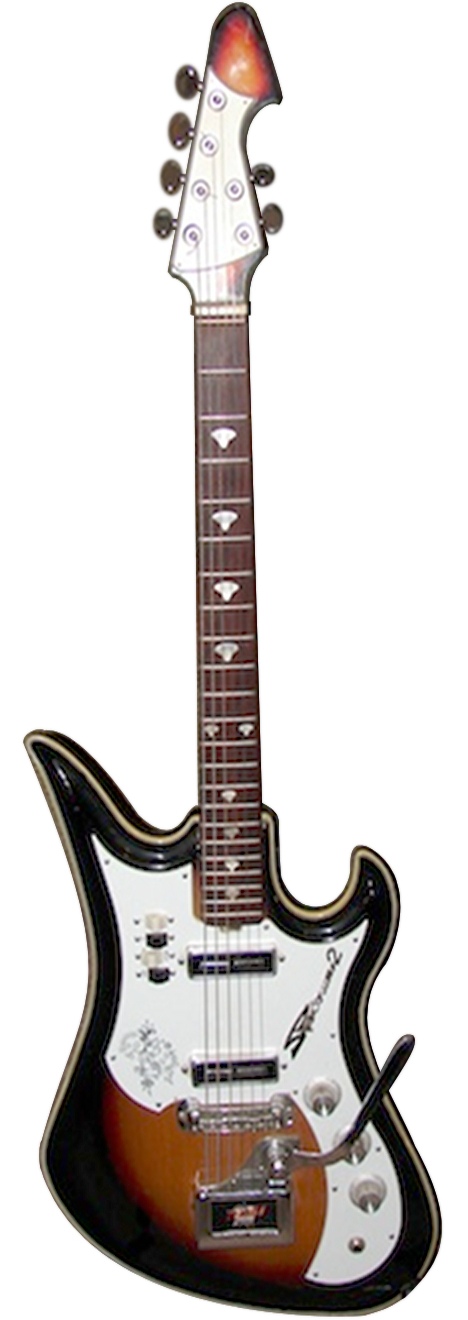
Spectrum 2 (S/N 374919)

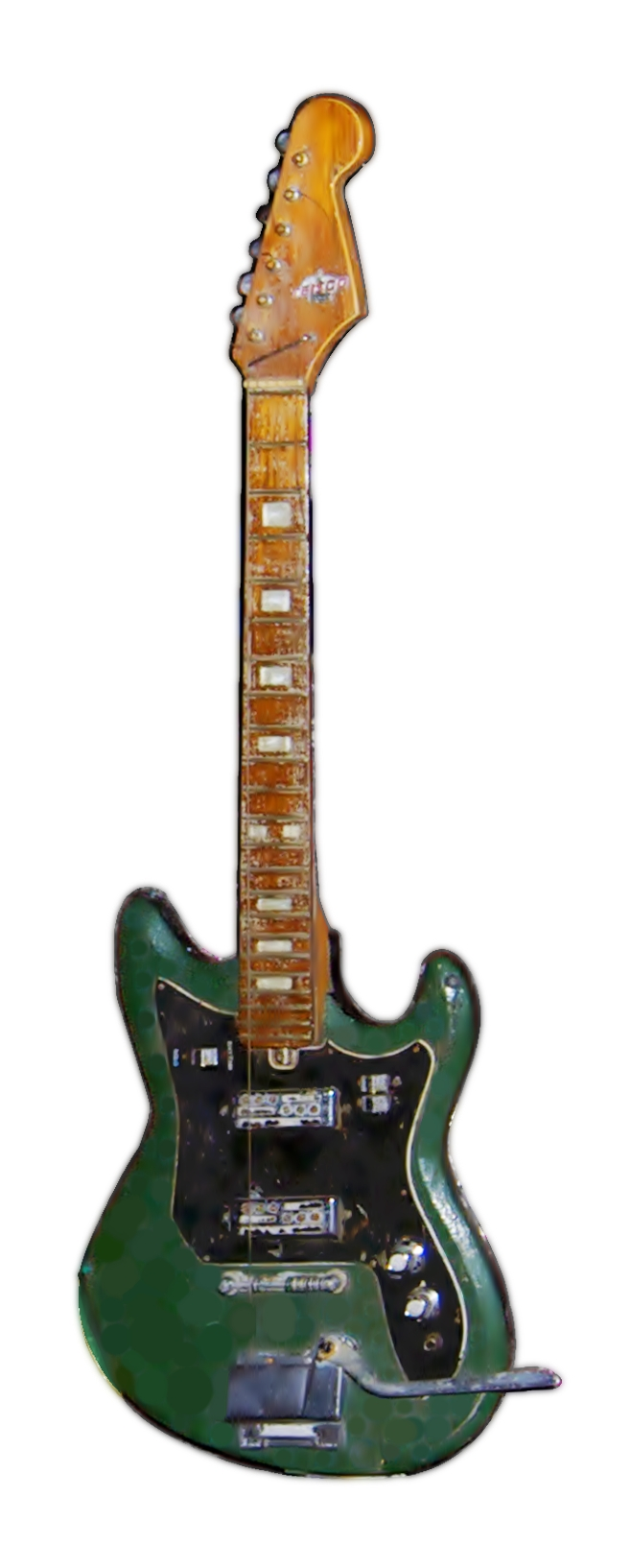
Spectrum 2 (ca.1969)

After Kawai bought Teisco in 1967, they started to produce all the Teisco guitars, as well as their own brand, Apollo. Hound Dog Taylor famously used a variety of these Kawai-era Teiscos, which he bought at his local Sears department store. Jim Reid of The Jesus and Mary Chain used a Spectrum 5. Also, James Iha of The Smashing Pumpkins played a K-2L, which can be seen in the music video for Rocket as well as the inside of the Pisces Iscariot CD jewel case. Ben Waugh (Scott Campbell), singer & guitarist for Apparition, The Sillies, and Scott Campbell Group played a modified ET-200 onstage and for studio recordings until it was stolen in 1985.

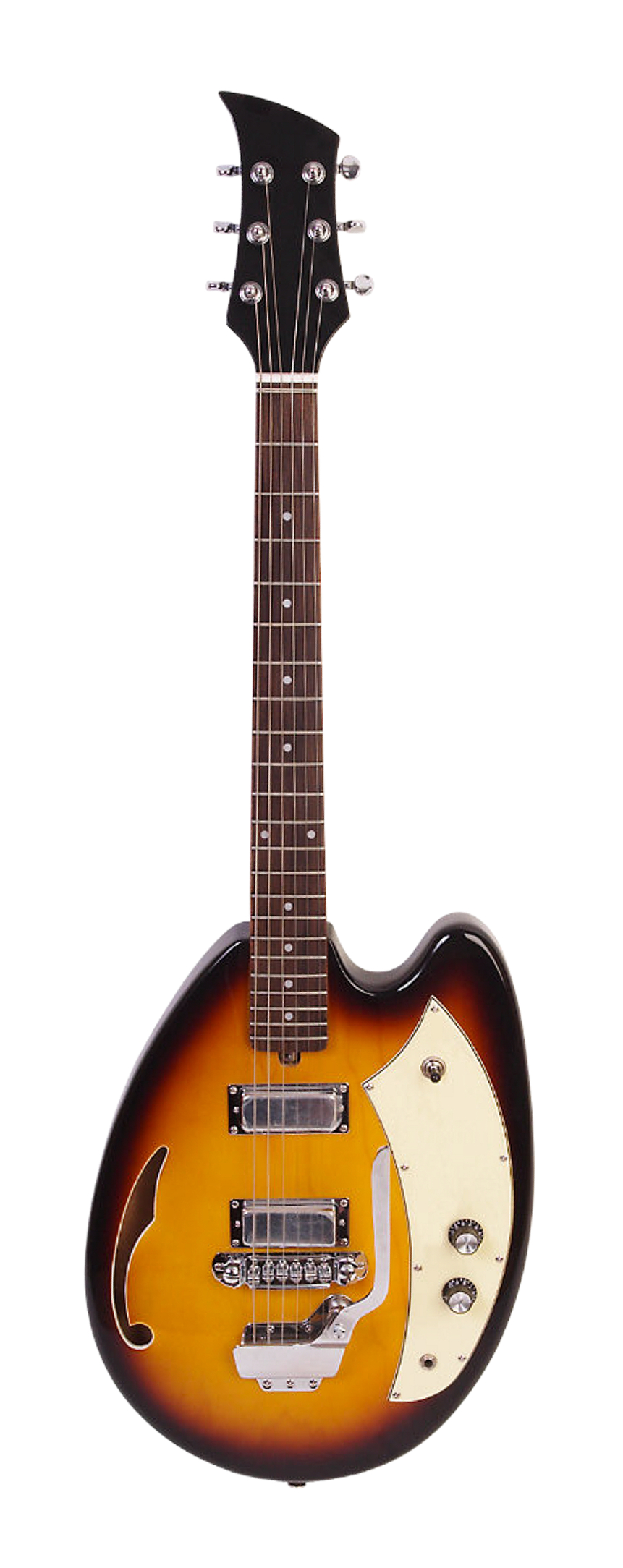
May Queen

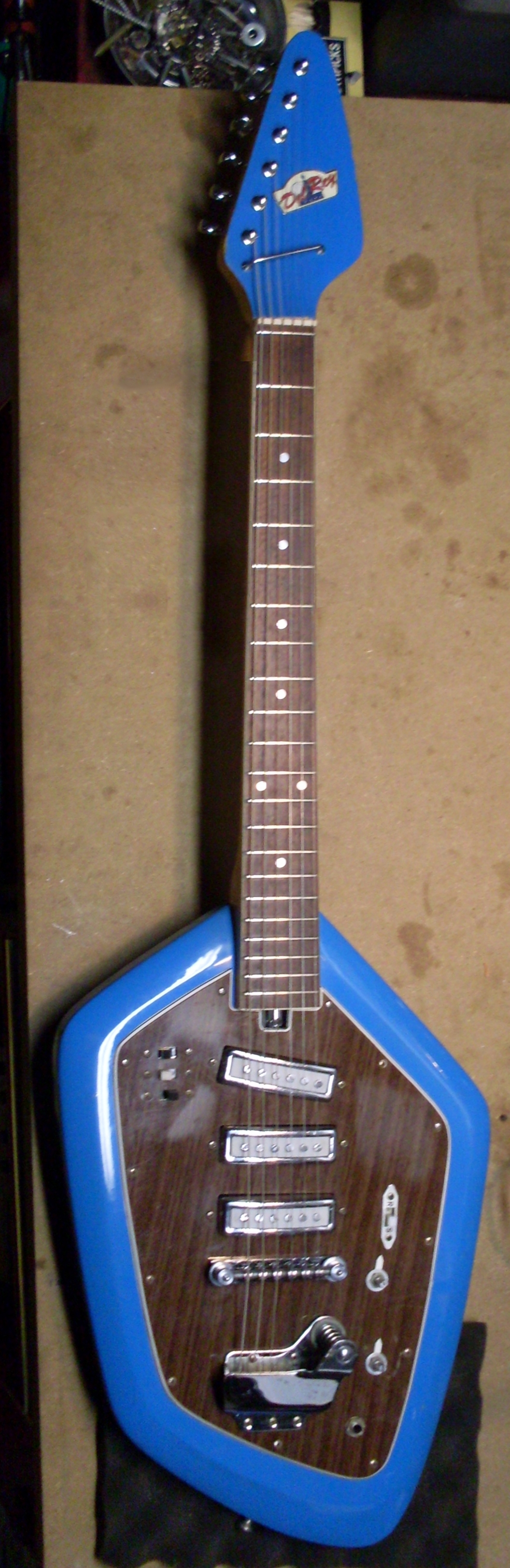
Del Rey EV-3T

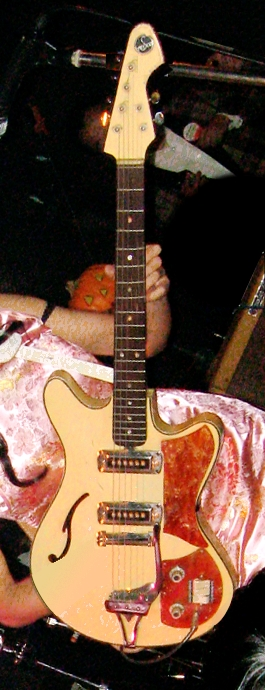
EP-200

Many Teisco guitars had a primitive tailed bridge in their extended tail bridges with limited timbre when used in an extended technique. When the strings are attacked behind the bridge, a 3rd bridge sound is created. This is one of the reasons these guitars became popular again during the 90s among many noise artists as a cheaper alternative for the Fender Jaguar or Jazzmaster, which were beginning to attract collector interest.

=== Baritone and bass guitars ===
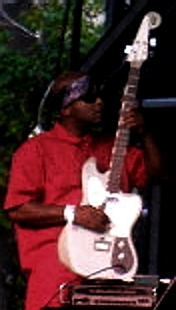
NB-4 (4string bass version of TB-64) played by Jeffrey Govan

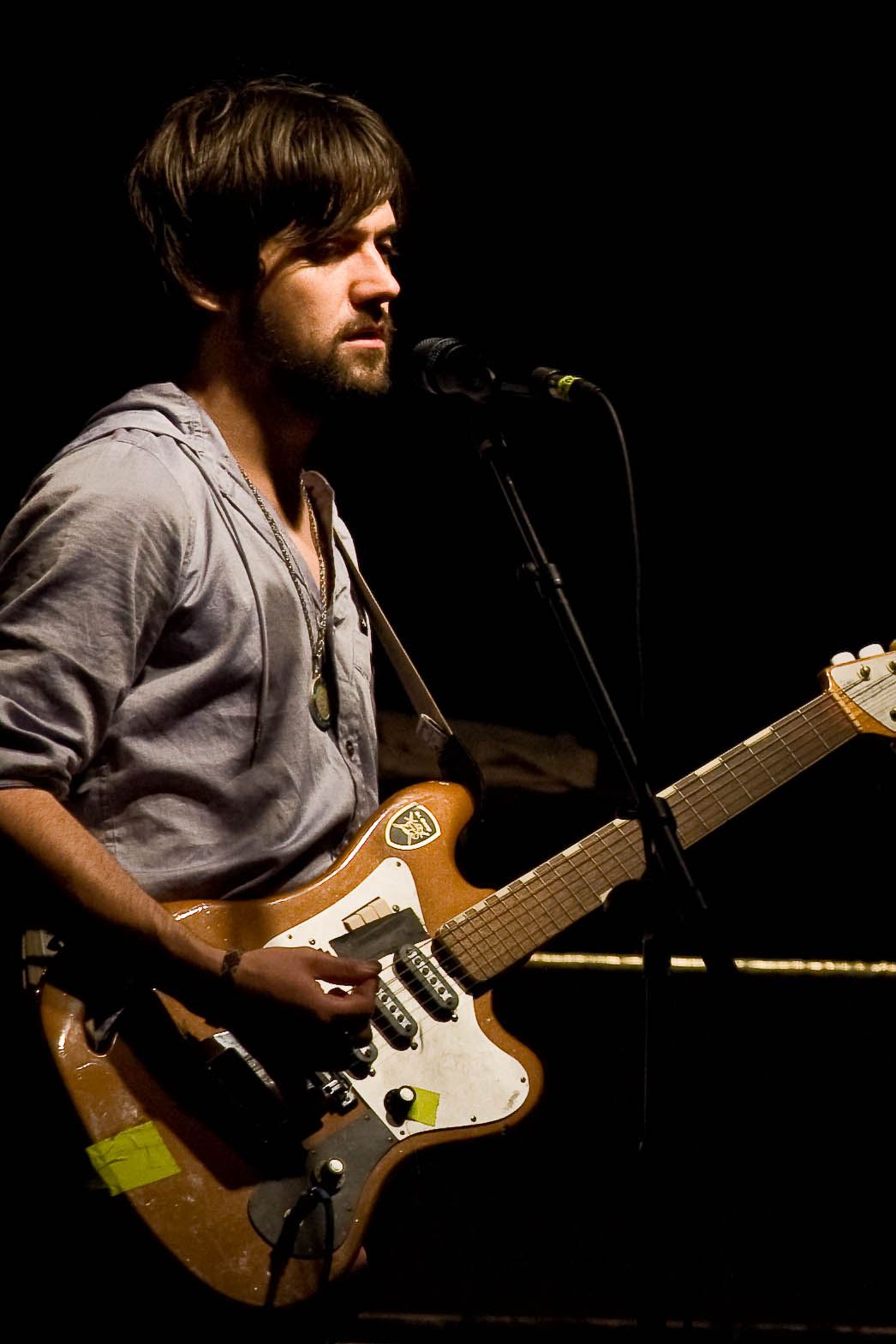
TG-64 (guitar version of TB-64 played by Conor Oberst)

Teisco also produced a six-string bass called TB-64 (or ET-320) in 1964, similar to the Fender Bass VI which was itself an uncommon instrument. Teisco six-string bass followed an unusual body shape that was used on one of their guitars. It had an off-set body shape similar to a Jazzmaster, but with an extended top horn, a 'monkey handle' cutout on the left-facing side of the bridge and a Fender-style headstock with an oversized scroll. This instrument, as well as its regular-scale guitar equivalent, can be heard extensively on Blonde Redhead's early albums of the 90s, where they used its wide range to switch between bass and guitar melodies in the course of single songs.

Also, 2 or 4-pickup baritone guitars (27 3/4 inch scale) with a tremolo, known as Demian or Orlando VN-2 or VN-4 ca.1964 manufactured by FujiGen, are often referred as Teisco models. However the formal relations between Teisco and these models are not enough verified yet.

=== Basses ===
Teisco basses are easily identified through a unique pickup design exclusive to the Del Rey series. This design consisted of a large rectangular chrome pickup with black plastic holding the four poles in one place. Other designs may vary, but are all easily distinguishable and unique among subsequent bass designs. Teisco made a short scale bass under the Heit Deluxe name. With a scale length of 23.5", it was a student or beginner instrument. It featured a single pickup, volume and tone controls and a rudimentary bridge/tailpiece.

=== Amplifiers ===
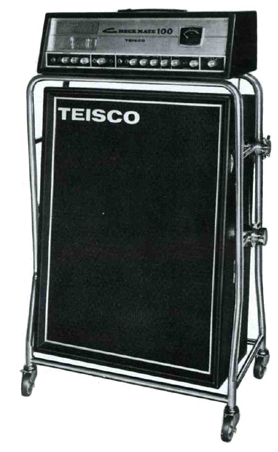
Checkmate 100

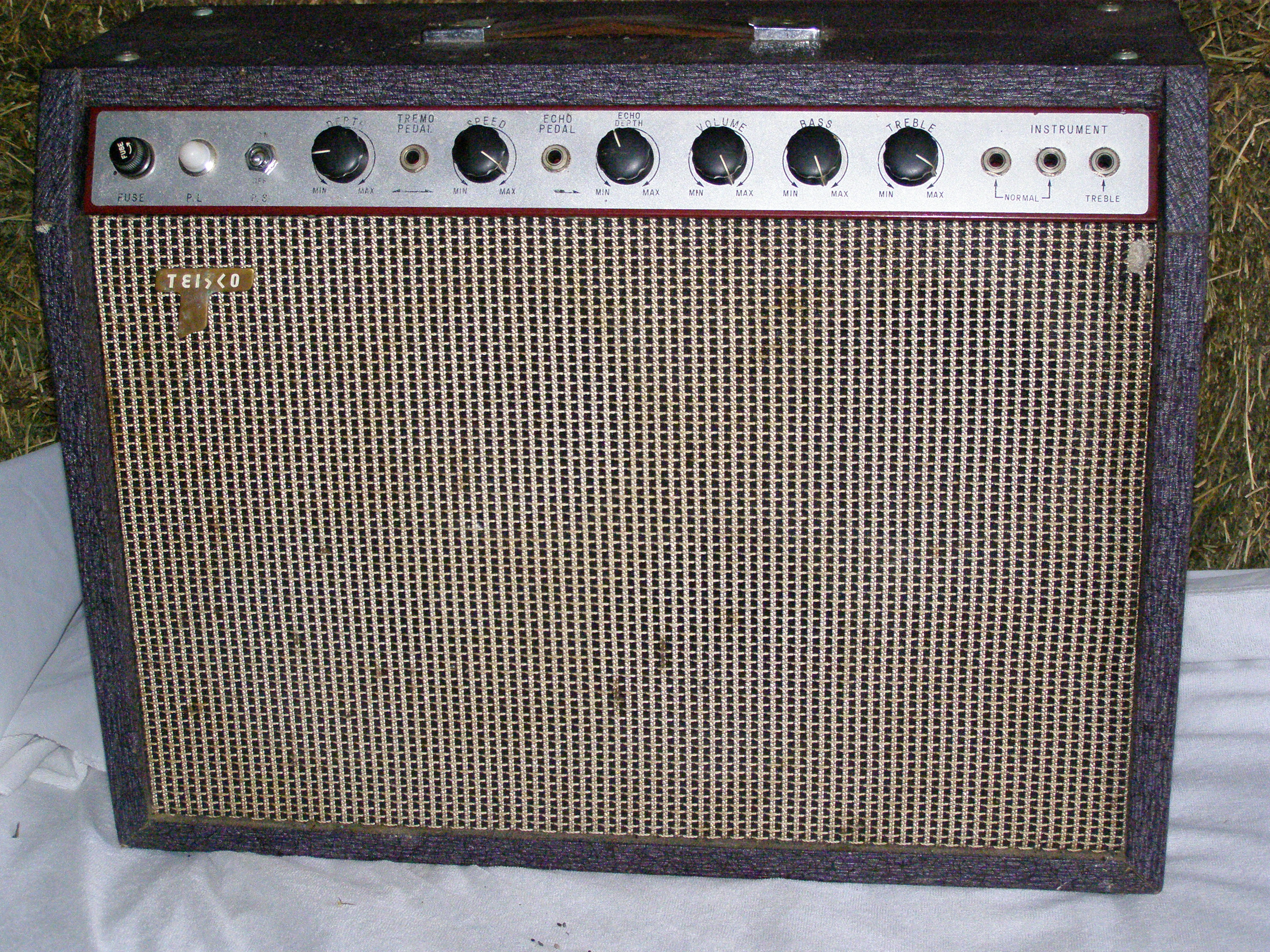
74 R amplifier

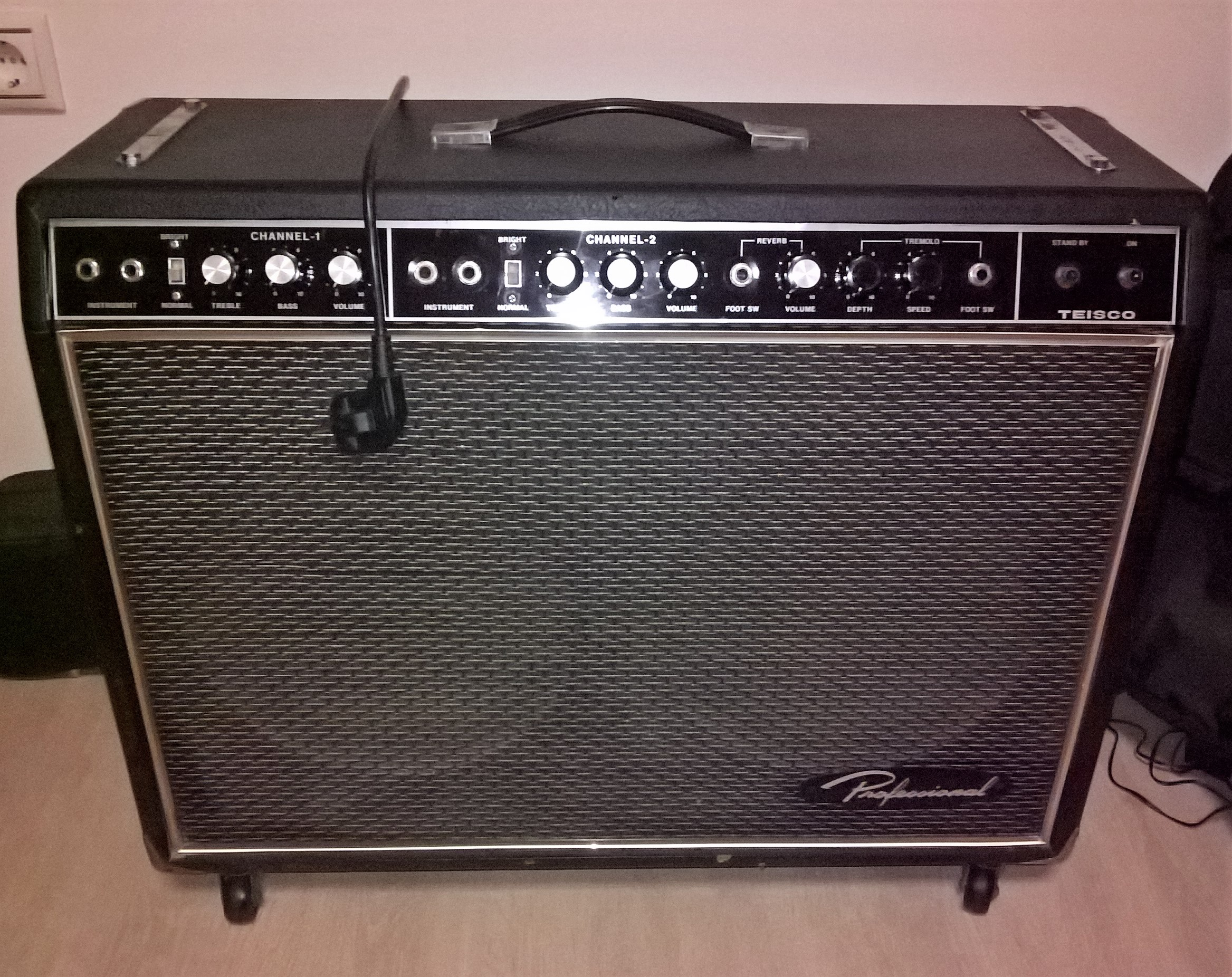
Teisco Professional

Teisco also produced numerous models of guitar and bass amplifiers which were often sold under the Checkmate brand name, but also named Teisco or Silvertone as well as Beltone and Melody. In the 1950s, early amplifier models were very basic 5-10 watt tube/valve designs. During the 1960s, more advanced and powerful models were offered, such as Checkmate 25, Checkmate 50, and Checkmate 100 featuring dual channels, reverb and tremolo effects. Teisco also made solid-state (transistor-based) models, some designed no less radically than their guitars of the time. The Sound Port 60 (60 watts/RMS) and Sound Port 120 (120 watts/RMS) amplifiers from the late 1960s were copies of Fender's silverfaced Vibro Champ and Twin Reverb.

=== Synthesizers ===
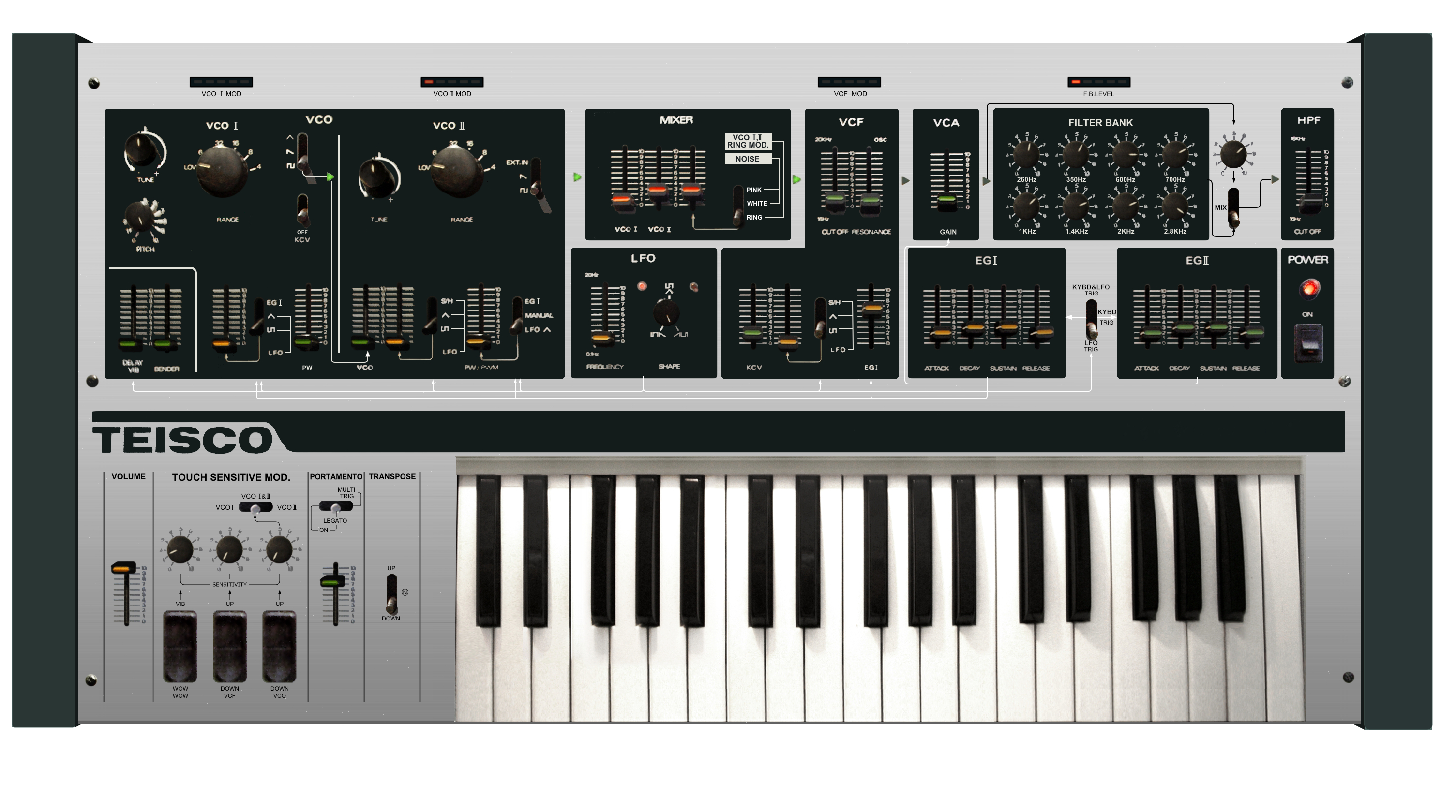
Teisco Synthesizer 110F

Teisco also produced a range of synthesizers, with models including the 60F, 110F, 100F, 100P, SX-210, SX-240, and SX-400.

Bands such as Hot Chip (UK), Pure Reason Revolution (UK), and Goose (Belgium) are known to use Teisco synthesizers.

=== Drums ===
Teisco marketed drum sets in limited sizes and configurations during the 1960s, sold under the brand name Del Ray. They were produced by sub-contractors to fill out the company's catalog as a supplier of combo instruments, but discontinued after the acquisition by Kawai.

=== PA system ===
Teisco monitors can be seen in The Beatles' 1966 concert in Tokyo.

== Bibliography ==
- OUTPUT – エレクトリックが新しい感情のダイナマイトだった [OUTPUT: Electric was a Dynamite of New Emotion]. Y.M.M. Player Magazine mook (in Japanese). Tokyo: Player Corporation. 1982-01-20. ID:09818-1-20.
- 60's Bizarre Guitars. Guitar Magazine mooks / Rittor Music mook (in Japanese). Tokyo: Rittor Music, Inc. 1993-03-01. OCLC 269873814. ID:4-69771-02, ASIN B0064YESZO. Archived from the original on 2016-03-04.
  The history described on this book is widely referred (for example, "Teisco catalog 1974/05"., etc), but this book itself has been discontinued for a long time.
- Meyers, Frank (2015). History of Japanese Electric Guitars. Centerstream Publications. ISBN 978-1-57424-315-4.

Models and Catalogs

- Teisco timeline by Mark Cole
- Teisco catalog 1964-1965, Nihon Onpa Kōgyō, Co. (日本音波工業)
- Teisco catalog 1965 by Yamaha
- Teisco catalog 1965-66, Teisco Co.
- Teisco catalog 1966, p. 1, 2–3, Teisco Co.
- Teisco catalog 1967, Teisco Shōji, Co. (テスコ商事)
- Teisco catalog 1968 (publisher unknown)
- New Sounds In Music – Solid State Effect Guitars (late 1960s), Teisco Shōji, Co. (テスコ商事)
- Teisco catalog 1974/05, Kawai/Teisco
- Teisco catalog 1980, Kawai/Teisco
- Teisco catalog 1982, Kawai/Teisco

== See also ==
- Kent guitars
