= Kent (guitar) =

Guitar brand by various manufacturers

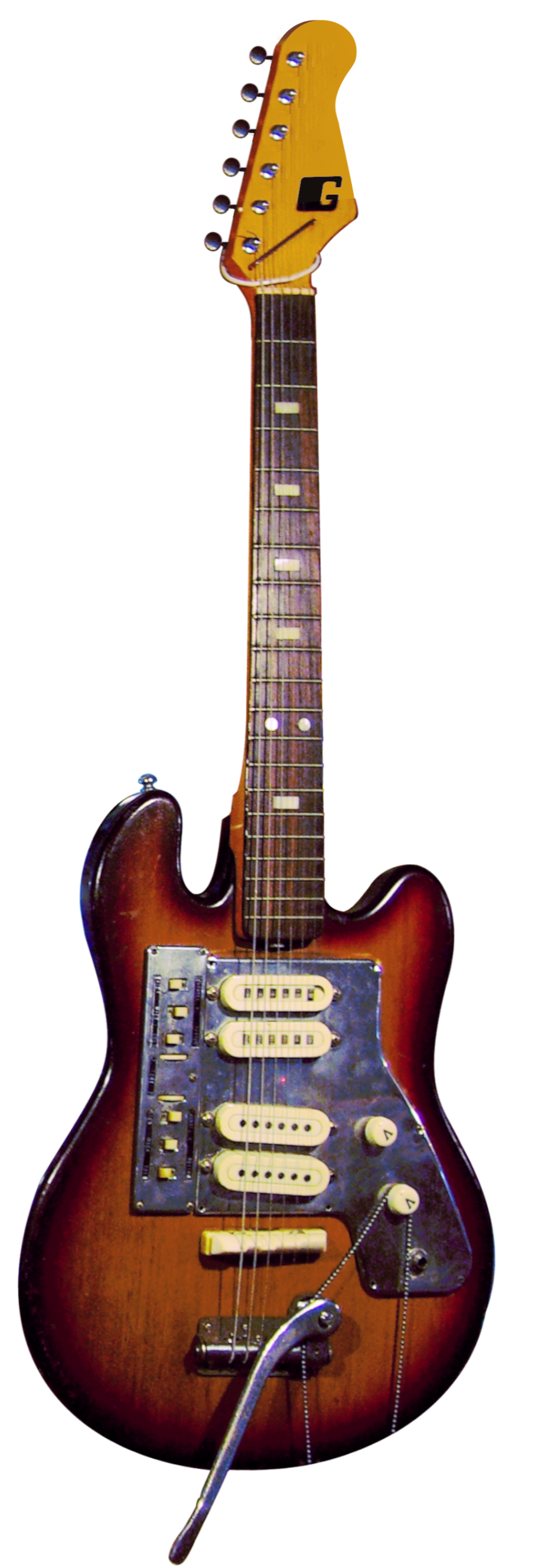
A Guyatone LG-140T electric guitar, aka the Kent 533 Videocaster (c.1964–65)

Kent was a 1960s/1970s guitar brand.

The "Kent" brand was established by Buegeleisen and Jacobson, a musical instrument distributor based in New York City, in 1960. Early Kent guitars were made by Hagström, based in Sweden. These were branded "Kent" in the United States and "Futurama" in the United Kingdom. Later, around 1963, Guyatone and Teisco guitars were rebadged as Kent guitars. Other manufacturers included FujiGen, Kawai, and Matsumoku. In the early 1970s, Southland Musical Merchandise Corporation acquired the Kent brand and moved manufacturing to South Korea.

Kent guitar series included the 400, 500, 600, 700 and 800 series. Kent guitar amplifiers and guitar pedals were also marketed by Buegeleisen and Jacobson. Kent guitars were played by musicians including David Bowie and Bob Dylan.
