= Buegeleisen and Jacobson =

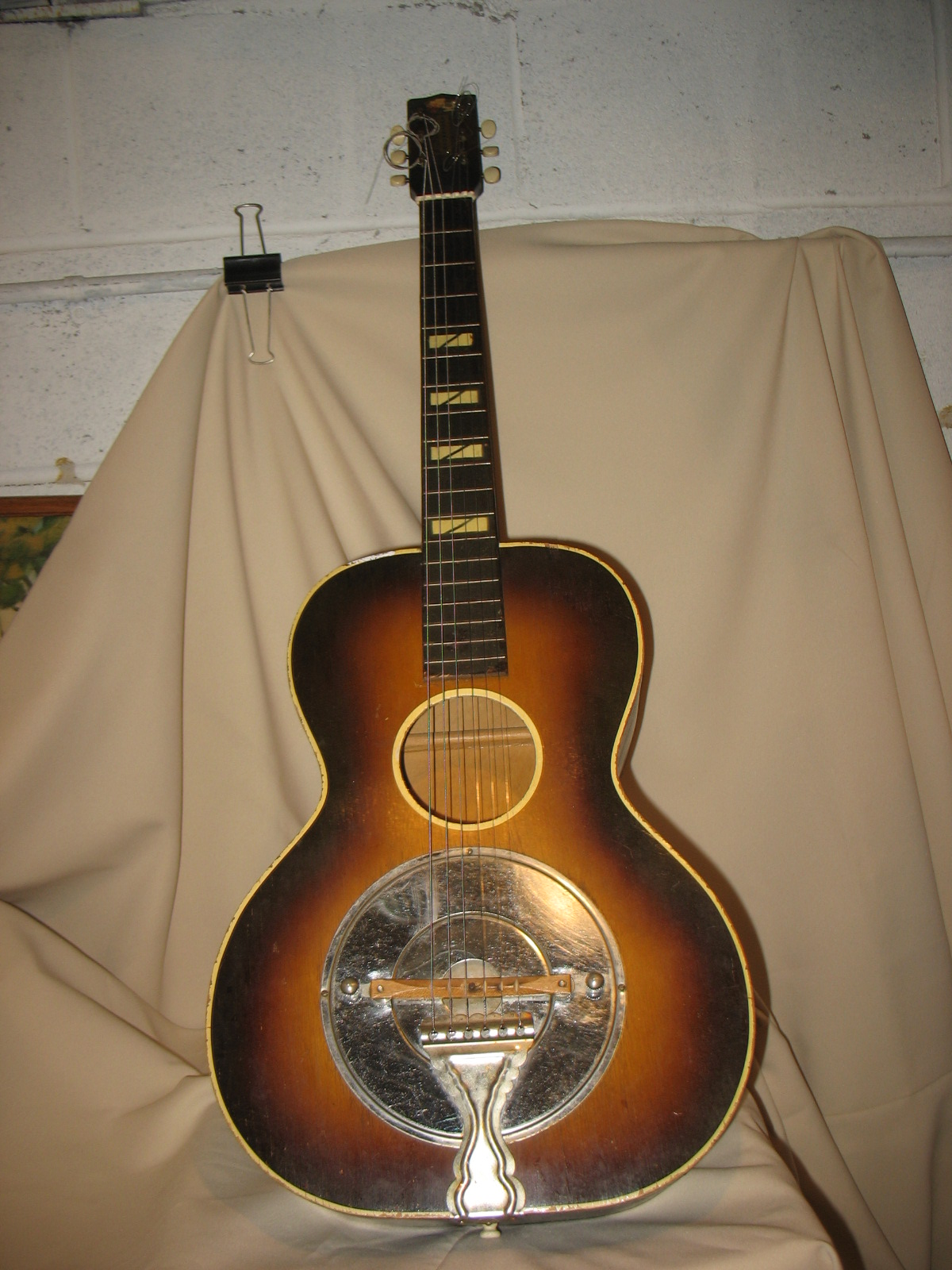
The Serenader metal soundboard guitar from B & J

Buegeleisen and Jacobson (B & J) was a musical instrument distributor in New York City, United States.

B & J opened for business in 1901, on 17th Street in Manhattan, run by the previously salesmen Samuel Buegeleisen (1871–1957) and David Jacobson (1869–1904). In 1913, they moved to University Place. They grew through the 1930s and 1940s, adapting their catalog as public tastes and demand changed. The company was closed in the early 1970s. The company sold instruments and accessories to dealers around the United States. Brands they owned or distributed for others included:

- Kay De Lux guitars
- Serenader guitars, banjos, and ukuleles
- S.S. Stewart guitars
- National guitars
- Abbott trumpets, clarinets, and trombones
- Salvadore De Durro violins
- Martin Freres flutes, oboes and clarinets
- LaMonte brand clarinets manufactured by Martin Freres
- Jean Martin brand clarinets manufactured by Martin Freres
- Coudet clarinets manufactured by Martin Freres
- Kent electric guitars
- Winston amplifiers

They also carried harmonicas, accordions, and many other instruments. Many of these instruments have become collectible.
