= Jimmy D'Aquisto =

American luthier (1935–1995)

- Born: James L. D'Aquisto; November 9, 1935; Brooklyn
- Died: April 17, 1995 (aged 59); California
- Occupation: luthier

James L. D'Aquisto (Brooklyn, November 9, 1935 – California, April 17, 1995) was an American luthier who concentrated on building and repairing archtop guitars. He served as an apprentice to John D'Angelico beginning in 1952 and later developed his own distinctive style.

== Career ==
James D'Aquisto was born on November 9, 1935 in Brooklyn, New York into a musical Italian family. He was raised on Long Island in many towns including Huntington, New York, Farmingdale, New York, Islip, New York, and in Greenpoint, Brooklyn.

An aspiring jazz guitarist he visited luthier John D'Angelico's shop in 1951 which lead to him in 1952 becoming his apprentice.

About his routine, D'Aquisto said:

I was making $35 a week. I was like the runner: I'd go to the stores, pick up the tuners, go get the tailpieces from downtown, take the necks to the engraver, all that. I cleaned the windows, swept the floors, everything—we all did that. On Friday we put away the tools and cleaned the shop so when Monday came the place would be spotless.

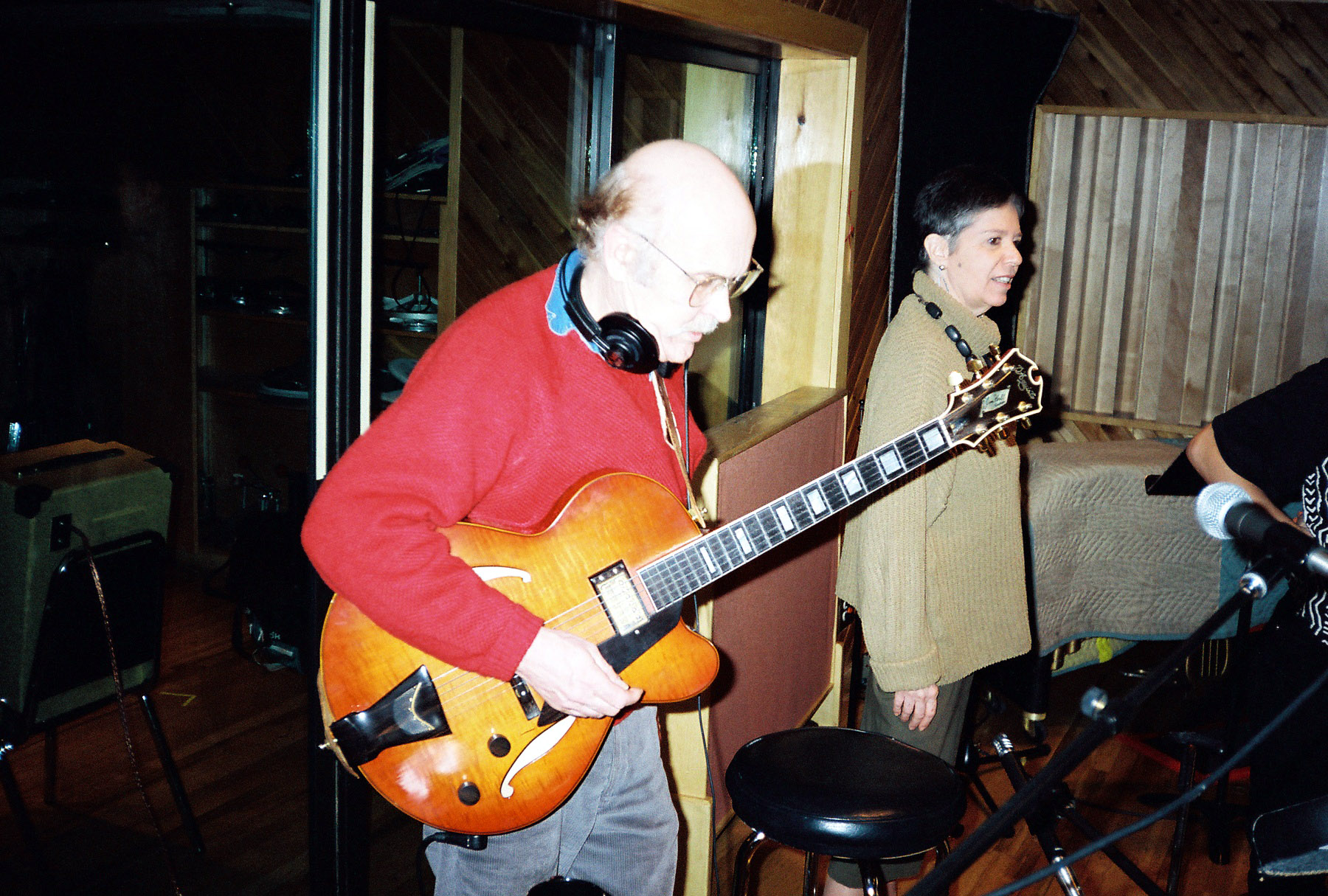
D'Aquisto guitar played by Jim Hall (Something Special recording in 1993)

Later, he learned the "rough work" of the D'Angelico style.

D'Angelico had a heart attack in 1959 and also parted ways with his long time employee Vincent "Jimmy" DiSerio. As a result he closed the business but soon reopened it after D'Aquisto who was unable to find work, convinced him to do so. After several more heart attacks and having also suffered from pneumonia John D'Angelico died on September 1, 1964, at the age of 59. Following D'Angelico's death the last ten of his guitars were finished by D'Aquisto. D'Aquisto bought the business but a poor business decision lost him the right to the D’Angelico name.

D'Aquisto then continued building guitars under his own name. In 1966 he moved to Huntington, Long Island, then to Farmingdale in 1973, and finally Greenport in 1980.

He felt he would die at the same age as his mentor, and this did occur on April 17, 1995, when he was 59.

D'Aquisto's name is on many guitar models from the Fender "D'Aquisto Elite" and the Fender Masterbuilt "D'Aquisto Deluxe" (which was a similar construction to the D'Aquisto Jim Hall model) and also the "D'Aquisto Ultra" (which was a larger built model with a floating pickup) and the Hagström Jimmy. His blue "Centura Deluxe" was the inspiration for the book Blue Guitar. His guitars have sold for tens of thousands of dollars to over $500,000. One of his guitars was the first to be worth a million dollars.

In 2006, D'Aquisto was inducted into the Long Island Music Hall of Fame. His tools and work bench, passed down to him from D'Angelico, were given to the National Music Museum.

In 2011, guitars by D'Aquisto were included in the 'Guitar Heroes' exhibition at the Metropolitan Museum of Art in New York City.

== D'Aquisto flat top guitars ==
D'Aquisto flat top guitars are a group of sixteen guitars made by D'Aquisto.

He made sixteen flat top guitars from 1973 to 1984. He made two types, a grand auditorium and a dreadnought. He believed the large oval sound hole produced greater projection than the typical round sound hole.

He numbered his guitars from 101 to 116. Number 101 was a non-cutaway auditorium as well as number 111, which he made for Laurie Veneziano and Janis Ian. Numbers 102 to 110 were his dreadnoughts. From 112 to 115, are the only flat tops he made with a cutaway. Each is a blond color. He used European spruce tops and European maple back and sides for all his flat tops. Ebony for the fret board, bridge, bridge pins, and headstock overlay. D'Aquisto also made a few nylon-string flat top guitars.

== Notable D'Aquisto players ==
- Dave Baney
- Mel Bay
- George Benson
- Joe Carbone
- Sal DiTroia
- Mark Elf
- Grant Green
- Jim Hall
- Janis Ian
- Mundell Lowe
- Woody Mann
- Steve Miller
- Joe Pass
- Peter Rogine
- Paul Simon
