= Toralf Tollefsen =

Toralf Louis Tollefsen (August 26, 1914 – November 27, 1994) was a Norwegian concert accordionist from Fredrikstad.

Tollefsen was born in Glemmen and studied accordion with Ottar E. Akre. He built an international career for himself, performing in Europe, the United States, Australia, and South Africa. In 1947 he performed as a soloist with a symphony orchestra in the Royal Albert Hall. He received the jury's honorary award in the 1977 Spellemannprisen Awards, a prestigious Norwegian music award similar to the American Grammy Award. Tollefsen died in Oslo.

== Discography ==
- Verdensartisten Toralf Tollefsen (The World-Renowned Artist Toralf Tollefsen). Sjøholt: Norild Records, 1994. Recordings from 1934 to 1960 issued for Tollefsen's 80th birthday, August 26, 1994
