= Ottar E. Akre =

Norwegian accordionist and composer

Ottar Edvardsen Akre (a.k.a. Ottar Agre, May 19, 1896 – October 29, 1992) was a Norwegian accordionist, composer, and educator, known for his many recordings and ensembles.

Akre was the son of the tailor Edvard O. Olsen Akre (1844–1925) and Oline Haagensdatter (1855–1934). Akre was born in Ytre Rendal Municipality. He paid sixteen kroner for his first accordion as an eight-year-old in 1904. In 1909 he was nearly killed when a load of timber collapsed, and he lay 6 months at Oslo University Hospital after this. He moved away from home quickly, working as a navvy for the Dovre Line and Røros Line, and he also worked as a cinema operator in Volda and Tyssedal in 1918. He studied under Johan Elsmo at Jømna in 1910, and in Kristiania he played a concert at Gamle Logen, where the royal couple were also present. During this time, he was also involved with Circus Norbech as an electrician, but began studying as an electrical engineer, which he continued in the United States from 1922 to 1928.

In the United States, performed in an ensemble called Angre's Scandia Art Bell Ringers, in a lineup including Georg Holter, Edvard M. Roll, and Albert E. Agre. Akre studied for some time at the Fargo College Conservatory of Music in North Dakota (in 1927). After returning to Norway in 1928, he was employed by the Carl M. Iversen company as a music salesman and instructor, where he taught some of Norway's future leading accordionists, such as Toralf Tollefsen, Oddvar Nygaard, Rolf Syversen, Alf Blyverket, Arnt Haugen, and Arnstein Johansen. Akre taught at the Oslo Conservatory of Music from 1940 to 1946.

Akre led several ensembles, including the Aakre Trio with Oscar Skau on guitar and Eugen Martinsen (later Amund Friestad) on violin in 1929; this lineup worked at Oslo nightclubs such as Røde Mølle, Grandkjelleren, and Original Pilsen. In ensembles such as the Tip Top Band (a quartet) and the Akre Quintet, he became generally known through broadcasting (Akre had his own weekly radio program for several years) and album releases with artists including Jens Book-Jenssen. The fifth instrument in the quintet was a glockenspiel. Acre was the first Norwegian performer to play an electric accordion (a Solovox in 1946; later a Cordovox). He also founded the Oslo Accordion Club (Oslo Trekkspillklubb) in 1945, which he led until 1977. Akre died in Oslo.

== Compositions ==
Akre composed over one hundred songs, including:

- "St. Hansvalsen" (St. John's Waltz)
- "Brandbuvalsen" (Brandbu Waltz)
- "Livet i Hemsedal" (Life in Hemsedal)
- "Østerdalsmazurka" (Østerdal Mazurka)
- "Fagerborg reinlender" (Fagerborg Schottische)
- "Glåmdalsbrudens vals" (The Bride of Glåmdal's Walz)
- "Jonsonvalsen" (Jonson Waltz)
- "Revymars" (Review March)
- "Sjonglørn" (The Juggler)

Akre wrote Norwegian lyrics to the song "When It's Springtime in the Rockies" (retitled "Det blir atter sol og sommer" 'It Will be Sun and Summer Again'). An exhibition dedicated to Akre can be found at Rendalstunet. The Ottar Acre Honorary Award (Ottar Akres ærespris) has been awarded twice annually since 1992 to young promising musicians.

== Honors and awards ==
- The King's Medal of Merit, 1972
- Honorary member of the Oslo Accordion Club
- Honorary member of the Norwegian Accordionists' Association
- Honorary member of the Swedish Accordionists' Association
- The second Vågå Award (Vågåfatet), 1978
- The Gammleng Award, 1987, in the veteran class
- The first Rendal Award, 1990
