= University Place (Manhattan) =

Street in Manhattan, New York

Coordinates: 40°43′57.07″N 73°59′38.41″W

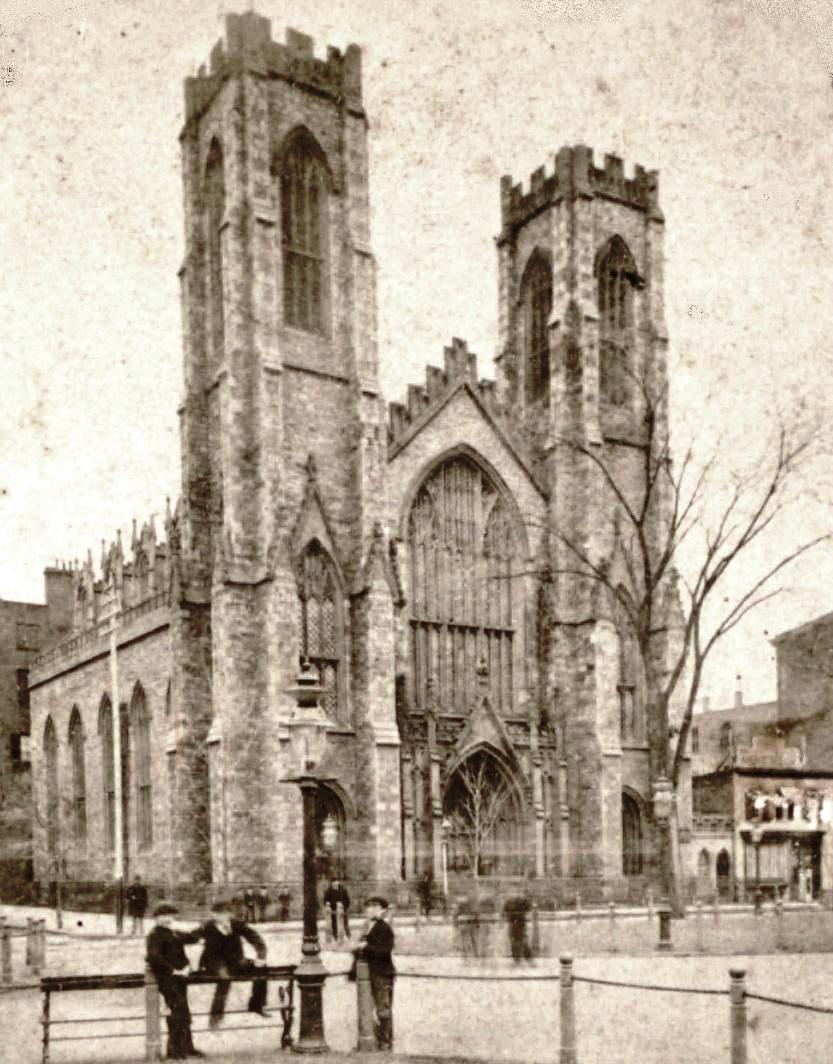
"Dr. Hutton's Church on University Place" (c. 1856–1879). More details A "Dr. Hutton" led a Dutch Reformed congregation on "Washington Square". This church was built in 1837, and Dr. Mancius S. Hutton retired from it c. 1879. The New York Public Library marks the images as from a collection that covers 1858–1925, so the image is from 1858–1879.

University Place is a short north-south thoroughfare in the Greenwich Village neighborhood of Manhattan, New York City, United States, which runs from Washington Square Park in the south as a continuation of Washington Square East, taking the position of Madison Avenue uptown, and terminates at East 14th Street just southwest of Union Square. Although the roadway continues north of 14th Street as Union Square West, traffic on the two streets run in opposite directions (University Place uptown, and Union Square West downtown), both feeding into 14th Street. Until the late 1990s, University Place was a two-way street. The street contains numerous cafes, shops, and restaurants, many of which cater to students at NYU and The New School.

== History ==
University Place was formerly part of Wooster Street, but received a new name in 1838, a year after New York University's first building opened on Washington Square. The street was the original location of the Union Theological Seminary in 1838, and the New York Society Library moved there in 1856. The Industrial Education Association, precursor to Teachers College, occupied the Union Theological Seminary building in the late 1880s.

== See also ==
- Buegeleisen and Jacobson, musical instrument distributor
