= Aage Grundstad =

Norwegian accordion player

Aage Grundstad (May 26, 1923 – April 8, 2012) was a Norwegian award-winning accordion player, originally from Vefsn Municipality.

Grundstad studied at the Oslo Conservatory of Music and graduated from the Veitvedt Music School. He had his solo debut on NRK in 1946, where he later had several radio concerts. He founded the club Friends of Old-Fashioned Dance (Venner av gammeldans) in Oslo with Angell Gabrielsen in 1954 and founded the Norwegian Accordionists' Association in 1971. Grundstad had his own ensemble with Knut Trøen, who studied the Norwegian figure dance (turdans) tradition, and released several albums.

== Releases ==
- Aage Grundstad's Ensemble: Norske tur- og folkedanser / Norwegian Folk- and Figuredances (EMI, 1977)
- Aage Grundstad's Ensemble: Norske tur- og folkedanser 2 / Norwegian Folk- and Figuredances (EMI, 1981)
- Aage Grundstad's Ensemble: Norske tur- og folkedanser 3 / Norwegian Folk- and Figuredances (EMI, 1985)
- Aage Grundstad's Ensemble: Norske tur- og folkedanser 4 / Norwegian Folk- and Figuredances (EMI, 1989)

== Awards and recognitions ==
- Defence Medal 1940–1945
- Royal Norwegian Society for Development Medal
- Rotary Paul Harris Fellow
