= Albin Hagström =

Swedish entrepreneur

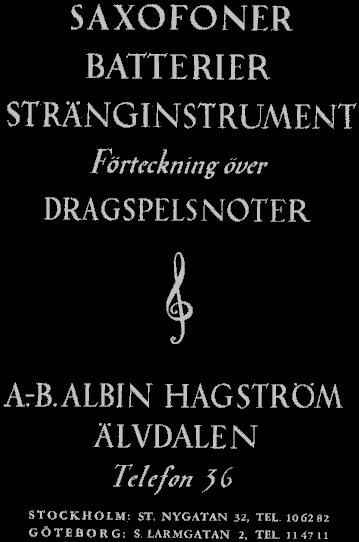
Music booklet published by Albin Hagström

Albin Hagström (May 25, 1905 in Orsa – April 3, 1952) was a Swedish entrepreneur.

== Background and family ==
Hagström was born in Orsa, Sweden. Hagström was the father of Karl-Erik Hagström (his business successor in 1961), Kärstin Hagström-Heikkinen, Lars Hagström, and Anna-Lehna Hagström.

== Career ==
Albin Hagström learned to play the accordion at an early age, and he started performing at local dances and parties. In 1921 he bought two German accordions. He then sold one of them, and he rented out the other one to local musicians. These were the roots of his industrial career. Hagström founded the company AB Albin Hagström in 1925 and built up a business empire based on manufacturing and selling accordions. The Hagström brand became internationally known and respected.

After importing and selling accordions for a few years, the Albin Hagström company was registered in 1925. The company was headquartered in Älvdalen. With the help of newspaper ads, Hagström continually found new business opportunities, and he began working with Italian accordion manufacturers to develop an accordion especially designed for the Swedish market.

His idea took off, and the demand for the Italian-made Hagström instruments was constantly growing. Hagström made several trips to Italy to develop new accordions, and at the same time learned the business.

Problems with deliveries and increasing concerns about the European currency market resulted in Hagström investing in his own manufacturing in 1932, and he opened his first accordion factory in Älvdalen.

Over the next 20 years, Hagström's company became one of the world's largest accordion producers, and the company constantly expanded until Hagström's death. It established factories internationally, including in the United States. A music school was started in connection with the business chain Hagström Musik, which became the model for municipal music schools.

Hagström died of sepsis in Stockholm.

== Legacy ==
The Albin Hagström Memorial Award, conferred from 1997 to 2006, was named after Hagström.
