= Peter Hagström =

Swedish ice hockey player

- Born: April 4, 1967 (age 57); Grums, SWE
- Height: 6 ft 0 in (183 cm)
- Weight: 198 lb (90 kg; 14 st 2 lb)
- Position: Right wing
- Shot: Left
- Played for: Färjestads BK; Modo Hockey
- Playing career: 1985–2002

Peter Hagström (born April 4, 1967, in Grums, Sweden) is a former professional Swedish ice hockey player.

During his career he played five seasons in the Swedish Elite League. He played for Färjestads BK between 1992–1994 and 1998–2000 and for Modo Hockey between 2000 and 2001. Before playing for Färjestad did he play with his home town club Grums IK in second highest league in Sweden, he also played with them between 1994 and 1998. After his season with Modo Hockey he played one last season with Grums IK before he retired.
