= Erling Westher =

Norwegian pianist (1903–1986)

Erling Westher (March 12, 1903 – July 3, 1986) was a Norwegian pianist and educator.

Westher debuted with the Oslo Philharmonic on November 10, 1927, with Christian Sinding's Konsert for klaver og orkester i D♭-Dur (Concerto for Piano and Orchestra in D♭ major). He taught at Nils Larsen's Piano Academy from 1924 to 1937. Westher took over the artistic leadership of the academy after Larsen's death in 1937, and he held that position until he established his own piano institute in 1948.

Regarding Westher's teaching work, the pianist Kjell Bækkelund wrote, among other things, that "What characterizes Westher's piano pedagogy is his intense empathy with the substance and his ability to inspire the student to the utmost, while at the same time he knows a lot about special piano problems and has found clarity in this area."

Westher's most prominent pupils included Kirsti Hjort, Ruth Lagesen, Olaug Fostås, Karin Westher, Oskar Raaum, Ella Arntsen, Rolf Østbye, Gunnar Sønstevold, Magne Hegdal, Ester Skogsrud, Johan Øian, Hans Olav Egede Larssen, Laila Aavatsmark, Edvard Hagerup Bull, Jarle Sørå, Kåre Siem, and Rolf Syversen.

Westher also worked as a music critic for the Oslo's magazines, and he was a regular music contributor to Arbeiderbladet from 1949 onward.

Westher composed the song "Slottsvalsen" (Castle Waltz), which was recorded and was popular in the 1930s.
