= Arnstein Johansen =

Norwegian musician

Arnstein Johansen (June 19, 1925 – September 26, 2013) was a Norwegian accordionist that played jazz and old-fashioned dances. He became well-known through his recordings and his international collaboration.

== Life ==
Johansen was born in Fredrikstad. He studied under Ottar E. Akre, Thorleif Ekren, and Gunnar Sønstevold, and also at the Norwegian Academy of Music. After the Second World War, he played in a duet with Rolf Andersen, and then spent time in the United States, playing with Pietro Frosini, Guido Deiro, and Anthony Galla-Rini.

He released a number of albums as a solo artist and with the Arnstein Johansen Quartet (Arnstein Johansen kvartett), later quintet: Gammeldans (Old-Fashioned Dances), Hæla i taket (Party Hardy), A.J.'s freskeste (A. J.'s Freshest), I ring og feiende sving (In Ring and Sweeping Swing), Evergreens (Golden Oldies), Tea for Two, Crazy Rhythm, Out of Nowhere, and Too Late Now. He also played with Sverre Cornelius Lund and participated in releases with Alf Prøysen and others.

Johansen composed well-known pieces such as "Cornelli polka," "Vals in C" (Waltz in C), and "Førdeminner" (Memories of Førde). He was an honorary member of the Norwegian Accordionists' Association and various local associations such as the Mo Accordionists' Club (Mo Trekkspillubb).

Johansen died at the age of 88 and was laid to rest at the church in Haslum in Bærum Municipality, Norway.

== Discography ==
=== With Sverre Cornelius Lund ===
- Spell og dans (1975)
- I ring og feiende sving (1976)

=== Solo albums ===
- Fagre Stryn (1963)
- Arnstein Johansens freskeste (1977)
- Don't Blame Me (1979)
- Arnstein Johansen Evergreens (1995)
- Arnstein Johansen Evergreens 2 (1996)
- Crazy Rhythm (1998)
- Out of Nowhere – Evergreens (2000)
- Too Late Now (2001)

=== Other releases ===
- Various artists: Ønskekassetten (1986)

== Awards ==
- 1996: Vågå Award (Vågåfatet), shared with Sverre Cornelius Lund
- 2006: Albin Hagström Memorial Award
