= Hagström Jimmy =

- Manufacturer: Hagström
- Period: 1969- 1979

Construction
- Body type: Hollowbody
- Neck joint: Set neck H-Expander truss rod
- Scale: 24.75"

Woods
- Body: Laminated birch
- Neck: Birch / mahogany
- Fretboard: Rosewood

Hardware
- Bridge: Trapeze tail piece with optional Bigsby vibrato
- Pickup(s): One or two humbucker pickups

Colors available
- Blond, white, cherry, sunburst and golden sunburst

The Hagström Jimmy is archtop jazz guitar built by Hagström in partnership with the American guitar luthier Jimmy D'Aquisto (1935–1995).

== Original run 1969 to 1979 ==
The Jimmy debuted in 1969 as a downsized archtop with 16" body that was narrower and thinner than an average sized jazz guitar. It had an arched laminated spruce top, two unbound f-holes, birch body and neck, and bound rosewood fretboard. It also was the first Hagstöm to feature the asymmetrical D'Aquisto-style headstock that later became the standard on almost all Hagström guitars. The headstock had large pearl inlays. The guitar came equipped with two humbucking pickups. Four-hundred and eighty Jimmys were produced in the initial run, they were more or less prototypes because Hagström intended to outsource the production of the Jimmy to the Swedish Bjärton factory, but before this could happen Bjärton closed its doors for good.

In 1976, D'Aquisto was once again called for by Hagström to help make a few improvements and get the line back in production. Hagström reintroduced the original Jimmy, with a slightly more conventional pickguard and pearl block inlays. Bodies were laminated birch, with a two-piece birch neck flanking a mahogany strip and Grover Imperial tuners. And the D'Aquisto headstock now had a "Designed by Jimmy D'Aquisto" inlay. In 1977 Hagstöm launched another version of the Jimmy, this time with a single round soundhole and a single humbucking pickup. Until 1979, when the Jimmy was discontinued, 1207 Jimmys with f-holes were made (including those 480 in the initial 1969 batch), and about 356 with the round soundhole.

HJ-500 NAT, HJ-600 VSB
- Manufacturer: Hagström
- Period: 2004- present

Construction
- Body type: Hollowbody
- Neck joint: Set neck H-Expander truss rod
- Scale: 24.75"

Woods
- Body: Maple, spruce
- Neck: Maple
- Fretboard: Hagström resinator fretboard

Hardware
- Bridge: Trapeze tail piece
- Pickup(s): Two HJ-50 humbuckers

Colors available
- Blond, Black gloss and vintage sunburst

== Re-Issue 2004 to present ==
In 2004 the Hagström line of guitars was resurrected under new ownership and a re-issue of the original Jimmy was launched under the name HJ-500 NAT and HJ-600 VSB with certain liberties taken by the new manufacturer. The new guitars are being produced in a dedicated Hagström plant in China and unlike the original guitars they are made out of maple instead of birch and the lacks the "Designed by Jimmy D'Aquisto" inlay on the headstock.
