= Norwegian Accordionists' Association =

The Norwegian Accordionists' Association (Norwegian: Norske Trekkspilleres Landsforbund, NTL) is a Norwegian musical organization for accordionists that was established on October 17, 1971.

The association's founders included Aage Grundstad. It has just over 3,000 members (grouped by counties), of which 200 are accordion orchestras. The association is headed by Trond Smalås, and it is headquartered in Oslo. It holds annual district championships in February leading up to the annual Norwegian Accordion Championship (NM på trekkspill), which in recent years has been held in Bergen (2000), Seljord (2001), Hønefoss (2002), Tromsø (2003), Malm (2004), Lillehammer (2005), Bodø (2006), Bø (2007), and Sandnes (2008). The 2019 championship will be held in Gol. The association also awards honorary membership, which has been held, among others, by the long-standing president of the association Birger Østbye, Arnstein Johansen, Arild Formoe, and Ottar E. Akre. The association's newsletter Trekkspillnytt (Accordion News) is published five times a year.
