= Rolf Syversen (musician) =

Rolf Sigurd Syversen (May 6, 1920 – May 7, 1987) was a Norwegian musician (piano and accordion), composer, and ensemble leader known from many recordings.

Syversen was born in Oslo. He studied under Kristian Hauger, Erling Westher, and Ottar E. Akre, and he took second place in the 1936 Nordic Accordion Grand Prix. During the German occupation of Norway he worked for a record company in Oslo as an ensemble leader, and he made recordings with artists including the Swedish singer Johnny Bode for the Norwegian market. Later he directed the choir at Chat Noir (from 1946 to 1949), was a member of the quintet Sy-We-La, worked as recording director for Iversen & Frogh A/S (Odeon / Columbia Records / His Master's Voice), and was repertoire manager for EMI (from 1969 onward). He became a celebrity accompanist for the television music program Husker du? He led many ensembles under his own name, creating dozens of recordings.

Syversen died in 1987 and is buried at Vestre Gravlund in Oslo.

== Publications ==
- Så spiller vi trekkspill (How to Play Accordion; Oslo: Norsk Musikforlag, 1945)

== Compositions ==
- "Rytmefeber" (Rhythm Fever, instrumental)
- "Østenfor sol og vestenfor måne" (East of the Sun, West of the Moon; lyrics: Juul Hansen)
