= Joe Carbone =

Joe Carbone is a teacher at The Equity Project 'TEP' charter school in Manhattan. He is best known as the Head Strength and Conditioning Coach of The Los Angeles Lakers (2004–2008) and the Personal Strength Coach and Trainer to Kobe Bryant (1996–2004). He is a Strength & Conditioning Specialist (CSCS) through the National Strength & Conditioning Association. Prior to 1996, Carbone was the Head Strength & Conditioning Coach of the Philadelphia 76ers.
