= Hagström Viking =

Viking, Viking 12, Viking II DeLuxe, Viking I N
- Manufacturer: Hagström
- Period: 1965- 1979

Construction
- Body type: Hollowbody
- Neck joint: Set neck H-Expander Truss Rod
- Scale: 24.75"

Woods
- Body: Flamed maple and spruce or bound birch
- Neck: Birch
- Fretboard: Rosewood or Ebony with Pearl Block or Dot Position Marks

Hardware
- Bridge: Long Travel Tune-O-Matic with Trapeze tail piece or optional Hagstrom Bigsby vibrato
- Pickup: Originally two single coils later replaced with two humbuckers

Colors available
- Natural, Cherry red, Sunburst, Mahogany sunburst, Golden mahogany sunburst, Tobacco sunburst

The Hagström Viking was the first semi-acoustic guitar manufactured by Hagström. It was originally launched in 1965 and was built until it was discontinued in 1979 a few years before Hagström closed down their manufacturing in Sweden. The Viking is currently being reproduced by the Hagström brand.

== 1965 to 1979 ==
The Hagström Viking was the first semi-acoustic guitar built by the Hagström company. It was launched in 1965 alongside Hagström's new 12-string guitar and two bass guitars. Two years later there was a twelve-string model launched simple called the Viking 12 and the Viking II Deluxe which featured gold plated machine heads and adjustable bridges. In 1967 Hagström player Frank Zappa's "Nifty, Tough & Bitchen" advertising agency was hired to promote the Hagström brand in the USA. This resulted in three print ads: "Nifty", "Long and Slippery", and "Folk Rock is a Drag", and a radio spot: "Long and Slippery".

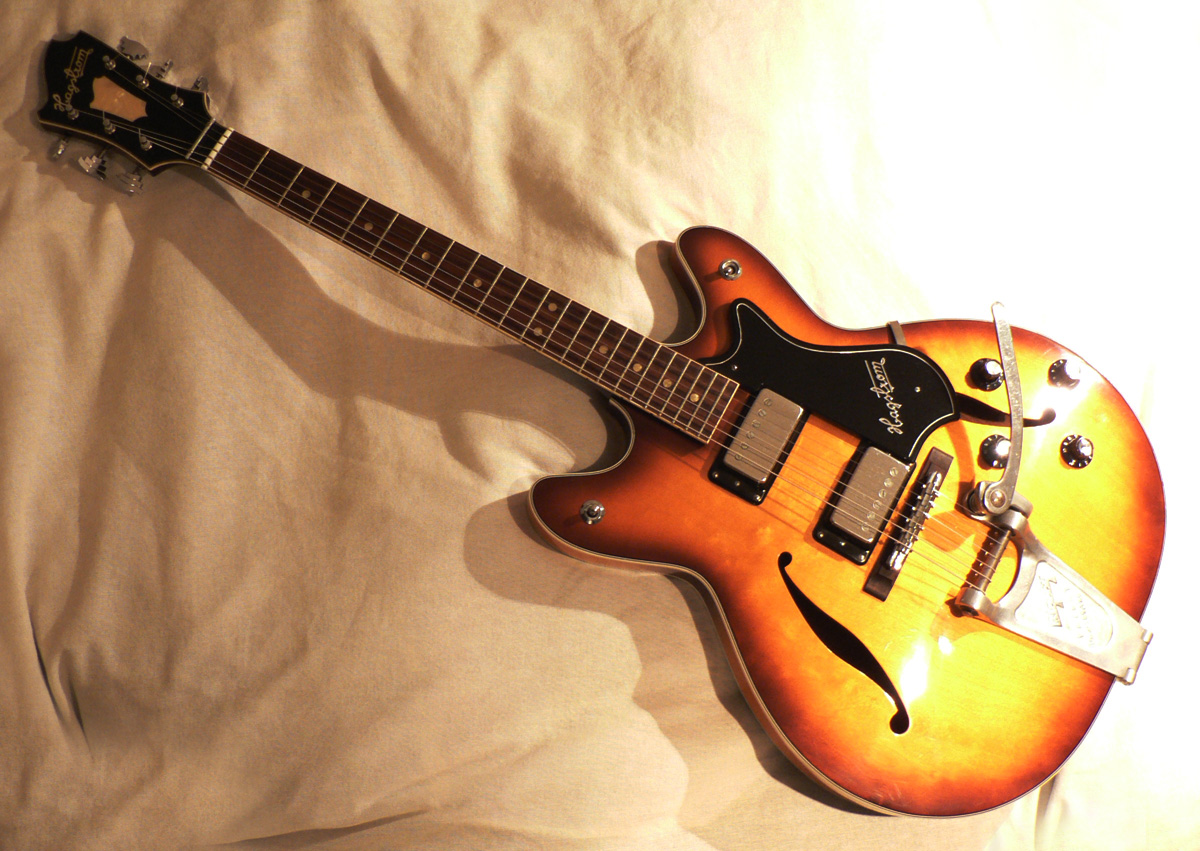
A vintage Hagström Viking fitted with a Bigsby vibrato.

In 1968 Hagström got much publicity when Elvis Presley played a Hagström Viking at the Elvis Presley Comeback Television Special for N.B.C. in the USA. Al Casey played a Viking II in the orchestra and was asked by producer Bones Howe if Elvis could borrow the guitar for the appearance. According to Elvis's drummer Hal Blaine it was considered a lucky charm by Elvis. To take advantage of this Hagström used pictures of Elvis with the Viking in ads until Elvis's manager advised them not to.

In 1972 the Viking I N replaced the original Viking; it was slightly reworked with two humbuckers replacing the original single-coil pickups and a new headstock called the ducks foot which previously had been used on the Hagström Swede. At the end of 1975 Schaller machine-heads replaced the older Van Ghent. From 1977 to 1978 all guitars featured Schaller machine-head with special butterfly design from Jimmy D´Aquisto. In 1979 the Viking was discontinued and four years later the Hagström plant in Sweden finally closed its doors.

Viking, Viking DeLuxe, Viking IIP
- Manufacturer: Hagström
- Period: 2004 – present

Construction
- Body type: Hollowbody
- Neck joint: Set neck or Bolt-on with H-Expander Truss Rod
- Scale: 24.75"

Woods
- Body: Maple or Basswood
- Neck: Maple
- Fretboard: Resinator Fretboard with Pearl Block or Dot Position Marks

Hardware
- Bridge: Long Travel Tune-O-Matic with Trapeze or Stop Tail Piece
- Pickup(s): 2x HJ-50 Humbuckers, Custom 58N (Neck), Custom 58B (Bridge) or 2x H90 Nickel Covered

Colors available
- Natural, Cream Red, Black Gloss, White, Wild Chery Transparent, Amber Sunburst, Cherry Sunburst, Tobacco Sunburst, Vintage Sunburst, Cosmic Black Burst, Gold Top

== 2004 to present ==
As of 2004 the Hagström brand has been resurrected and is currently marketing models based on the popular Swedish designs including the Viking. The new lineup is being produced in a dedicated plant in China, and includes four Viking models: the Viking, the Viking DeLuxe, the Super Viking and the Viking IIP. The Viking and Viking DeLuxe are fairly similar while the Viking IIP has several differences to allow a lower price.

In 2008 Dweezil Zappa joins up with Hagström to recreate the ads and to recreate some of his father's music in the "Zappa plays Zappa" tour.

== Notable users ==
- Elvis Presley - 68 Comeback Special
- Frank Zappa - The Mothers of Invention
- Dweezil Zappa - Zappa plays Zappa
- Pat Smear - Nirvana, Foo Fighters and the Germs
- Kurt Cobain - Nirvana
- Uno Svenningsson - (Swedish singer/songwriter)
- Johan Persson - Hovet
- Tim Armstrong - Rancid (band)
- Ginger Wildheart - The Wildhearts, Hey! Hello!, solo, and various side-projects
- Al Muir - Trunkshot
