= Swede Patch 2000 =

Swede Patch / Swede Patch 2000
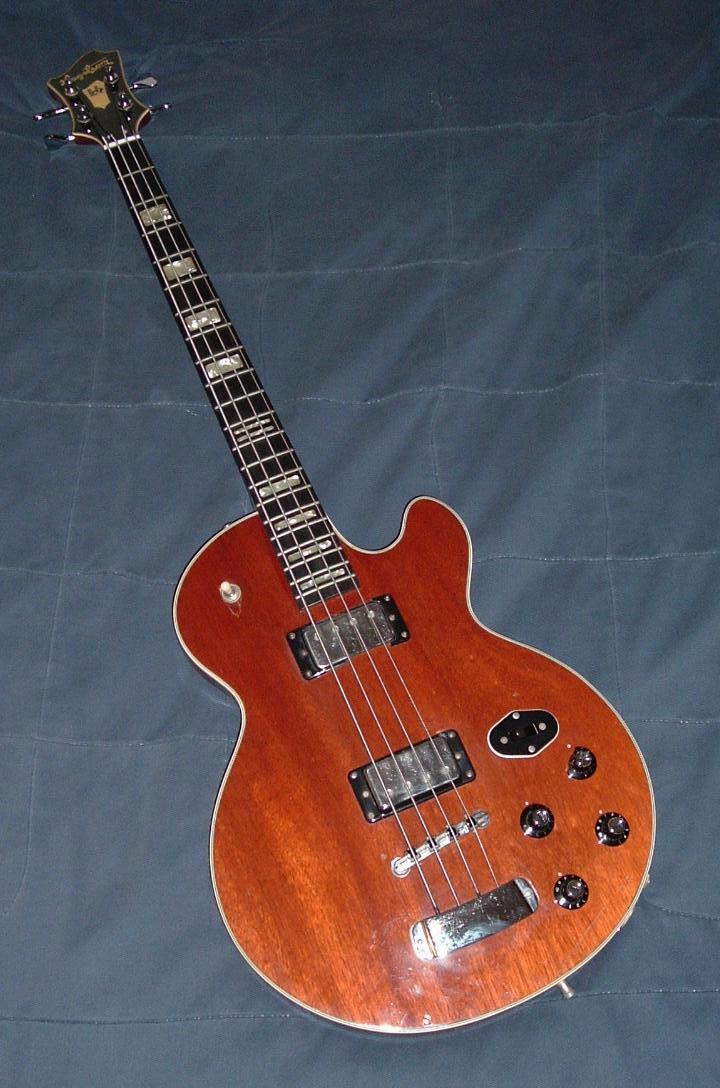
- Hagström Patch 2000 Bass
- Manufacturer: Hagström / Ampeg
- Period: 1976-1979

Construction
- Body type: Solid single cutaway
- Neck joint: Set neck H-Expander truss rod
- Scale: 24,75“ / 629 mm

Woods
- Body: Mahogany
- Neck: Mahogany
- Fretboard: Resonator Wood with dot inlays and extra high frets

Hardware
- Bridge: Isolated Long Travel; Tune-O-Matic
- Pickup(s): 2 x Hagström original pickups developed and produced in Sweden

Colors available
- Natural mahogany.

The Hagström Swede Patch 2000 is the first guitar/synthesizer hybrid. It was manufactured by Hagström in collaboration with Ampeg. The guitar appears to be a normal Hagström Swede but the neck is specially wired to transmit an input to a synthesizer when the strings come in contact with the frets. This gives the player the option of playing the instrument as a guitar, as a synthesizer or a combination of both.

== Development ==
Preparations for the development started in 1975 when twelve guitars were to be finished for a music convention. In April of that year Hagström received from Ampeg the first electronic circuits to be put inside the body of the guitar. It could be switched between the traditional guitar sound and the synthesizer sound, and was equipped with two signal outlets.

In synthesizer mode the electronics would generate a signal when a string formed an electrical contact with a fret. If simultaneous contacts were detected, the electronics selected the highest fret and the lowest string among the fretted notes.

Each fret had to be connected to the electronics with its own wire running along inside the neck. Also each string had to be individually connected, and therefore isolated from the rest of the hardware, which meant that Hagström had to develop a new tailpiece/bridge system. The result very much resembled the standard Hagström hardware, except that the centers of the saddles were made of a dense plastic, and instead of a single tailpiece the strings terminated at separate blocks set in 2 rows.

The generated signal was sent to the Patch 2000 box by a special cable. The Patch 2000 box was equipped with a pitch pedal that raised the pitch in semitone increments up to one full octave, a glide pedal that controlled portamento, and a Fifth Harmony Switch which produced a tone a natural fifth above the played note. Leaving the Patch-2000 box the signal was meant to control an analog synthesizer for final sound generation.

Synthesizers were not provided by the manufacturer. With the Patch 2000 in mind, the American synthesizer company Steiner-Parker (Steiner Synthesizers) developed and sold the Microcon, a small size synthesizer without a keyboard, with many facilities of a "big" synthesizer.

The bass was tried by a test-panel which included Mick Box (Uriah Heep), Bob Welch and John McVie who commented on its monophonic nature, saying "It had very clear solo sounds, but the fact is that you couldn't use chords, which is an integral part of your music...you can only use it just for solos."

A total of 498 right hand models were produced from 1976 to 1979, with the vast majority being sold to Leo's Music, Don Weir and Guitar Center in the Bay Area and Los Angeles. 11 left-handed models based on the Hagström Swede were manufactured in 1977. Additionally a small run of Swede and Fender Jazz bass guitars were equipped with the Patch 2000 system.
