= Hagström =

Swedish musical instrument company

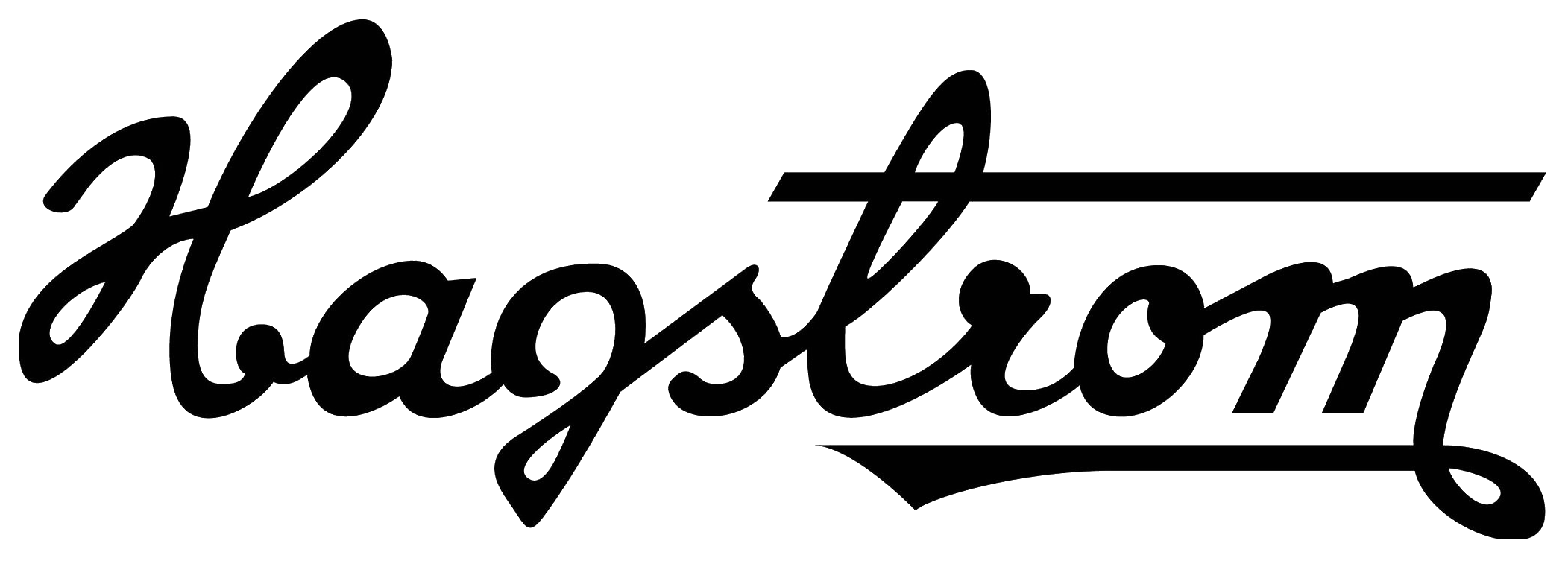
- Type: Private
- Industry: Musical instruments
- Founded: 1925; 101 years ago
- Founder: Albin Hagström
- Defunct: c. 1983–2004
- Headquarters: Älvdalen, Sweden
- Area served: Global
- Key people: Albin Hagström, Karl-Erik Hagström, Jimmy D'Aquisto
- Products: accordions Acoustic and electric guitars Bass guitars mandolins banjos lap steel guitars Amplifiers effects units mixing consoles guitar strings
- Parent: Tricor AB
- Website: hagstromguitars.com

Hagström (Swedish pronunciation: [ˈhɑ̌ːɡstrœm]) is a musical instrument manufacturer in Älvdalen, Dalecarlia, Sweden. Their original products were accordions that they initially imported from Germany and then Italy before opening their own facility in 1932. During the late 1950s, the company started making electric guitars and later amplifiers. The early guitars were heavily influenced by the accordion production and had a special look and feel. Hagström were the first company to mass-produce 8 string bass guitars as well as the first to build a guitar/synthesizer hybrid (Swede Patch 2000). The company ceased production in 1983. In 2004 the brand was resurrected and has since been building guitars both in Europe and in Asia. Throughout the years Hagström has expanded their line of products since the restart of the brand and re-introduced such Hagstrom classics as their famous Hagström H8, an 8 string bass. Hagstrom has also introduced new models and designs, where the firm still operates out of Sweden.

== Accordions: 1925 to 1970 ==
Albin Hagström began importing accordions from Germany and Italy in 1925 and founded "Firma Albin Hagström". Albin expanded his business with shops in Sweden, Norway and Denmark and in 1932 he started manufacturing accordions himself in Älvdalen. In 1936, Hagström hired two Italian accordion builders who helped to update and streamline the manufacturing process. In 1939 Hagström started to establish themselves in USA by opening "Hagstrom Music Company Inc." in Rockefeller Center in New York as well as "Albin Hagstrom Inc." in Jamestown. However, in 1940 the launch was canceled due to World War II and the people hired to run the company disappeared with the company's funds. In 1946 Sven Hillring was sent over from Sweden to oversee a new launch of the new accordion factory in Jamestown, which was in business until 1949.

Back in Sweden the brand continued to grow throughout the 1940s and 1950s and at one time had a total of forty-eight shops in northern Europe. In 1953 the accordion production reached its peak with 15,000 units being built. At this time the company also started a number of accordion schools; it is estimated that over 70,000 people have attended these schools. Founder Albin Hagström died in 1952 at the age 47 and was succeeded by Erik Wisén. In 1968 the Super Cromatic was introduced which came to be the last accordion built, with the last one made in 1970.

In 1984 the company returned to its roots by once again importing accordions from Germany and Italy. The shops were sold, and employees were encouraged to venture out on their own, which resulted in two new companies in Älvdalen. Musitech was started by Hagstrom and sold to Rolf Lindhamn, who was the official Swedish retailer of Aria and Guild guitars. Per-Åke Olsson who participated in the development of the Super Swede founded Amtech which is producing PA systems and light rigs as well as computer equipment. The original "AB Albin Hagström" company still exists to this day and still owns many of the facilities in Sweden, Norway and Denmark.

=== Hagströms Accordions ===
- 1930s
  - Excellent – The first accordions manufactured by Hagström.
  - Granesso
- 1940s
  - 389-31
  - "Granesso 70
  - Accordia Superior and Extra
- 1950s
  - Castello" and Minor – Built in Italy.
  - Skandia
  - 773 and 813
  - Constellation, Marita and Rosella
  - Master 4/5
  - Rigoletto I, II and III
  - Rosita I and II
  - Consul Maestro and Maestoso
  - Constella II and Estrella
  - Accordia Royal
  - "Diana" Prod in Älvdalen ca 1955–1960.
- 1960s
  - Walter Special 40 – Named after Andrew Walter, well-known contemporary accordionist.
  - Super Cromatic – The last accordion manufactured, widely considered to be one of the best accordions available.

== Guitars: 1958 to 1983 ==
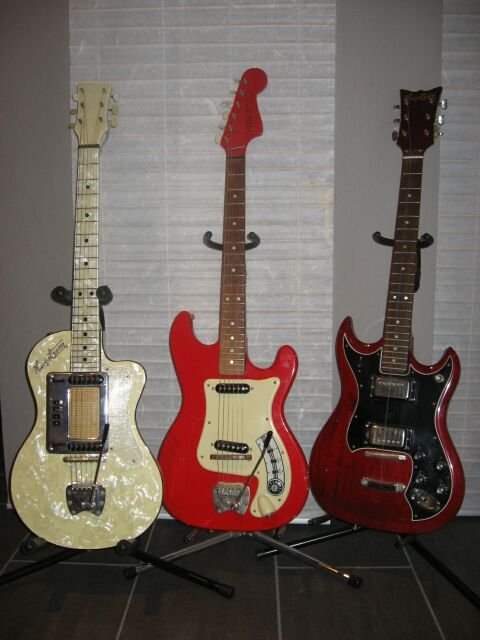
Three generations of Hagström guitars: A Standard 80 made in 1960, a Kent II made in 1964 and a HIIN OT made in 1975

In 1958, Swedish-based Hagström started manufacturing electric guitars, being one of the first to produce the instrument professionally outside of the United States. The early Hagström Deluxe solid body guitars featured a distinctive sparkle and pearloid celluloid finish that was previously used on their line of accordions. Soon Hagström expanded their line-up of guitars to include hollow bodies like the Viking and the Jimmy. In 1961 the first line of Hagström basses was available to the public, this eventually came to include the groundbreaking 8 string bass.

Models of electric guitar included the Hagström 1, the H series (h II, h III, h II N), the Swede (Originally called The Hagström LP, or Les Paul, due to the instrument's resemblance to the popular Les Paul manufactured by Gibson Guitars), the Super Swede, the Impala, the Corvette (called the Condor in the US), the Viking, the Swede Patch 2000 (one of the first synthesizer guitars) and the Jimmy (named for Jimmy D'Aquisto, a respected New York luthier brought in by Hagström to design the guitar). Basses include The Swede Bass and the Hagström H8 – the first ever mass-produced eight stringed bass guitar, which found fame when used by the likes of Noel Redding, Jimi Hendrix, Mike Rutherford, and others. Another innovation was the H-Expander Truss Rod, which gives the neck additional strength allowing it to be unusually thin. Thus the action can be set lower than guitar necks built with traditional truss rods.

Beside their line of instruments Hagström also produced amplifiers, speakers, effects units, guitar strings and mixing consoles, which were used by ABBA on their first world tour. A very small run of lap steels, banjos and mandolins were also built but are rare to come across. In 1962 Albin's son, Karl-Erik Hagström returned from working five years in the US with establishing their Line O guitars. In 1967 he took over as CEO of the company. In their native Sweden, the company became well known not only for selling music hardware, but also for "teach-yourself" books and mail courses on electric guitar, bass, keyboards etc., learning tools that deliberately took in a rock and pop repertory, chord analysis and tuning apart from teaching how to read music. By recognizing the electric guitar as an instrument in its own right, and not just an amped-up version of the acoustic and by accepting the new repertory, Hagström popularized the instrumental skills of the new music outside of the networks associated with rock clubs, and record shops, and at a time when rock music was barely ever being written about from a musical perspective.

Production ended for Swedish-made Hagströms in 1983 as the company were outpriced by other major guitar brands that had moved their stock production lines to Asia. Hagström did make some Japanese prototypes; however, they were not pleased with the workmanship and would rather close down the company than cheapen the brand. The interest in the original Hagström brand still has a cult following around the world and a Hagström Festival takes place in Älvdalen, Sweden around the first week of June every year since 2006.

=== Hagström Guitars ===
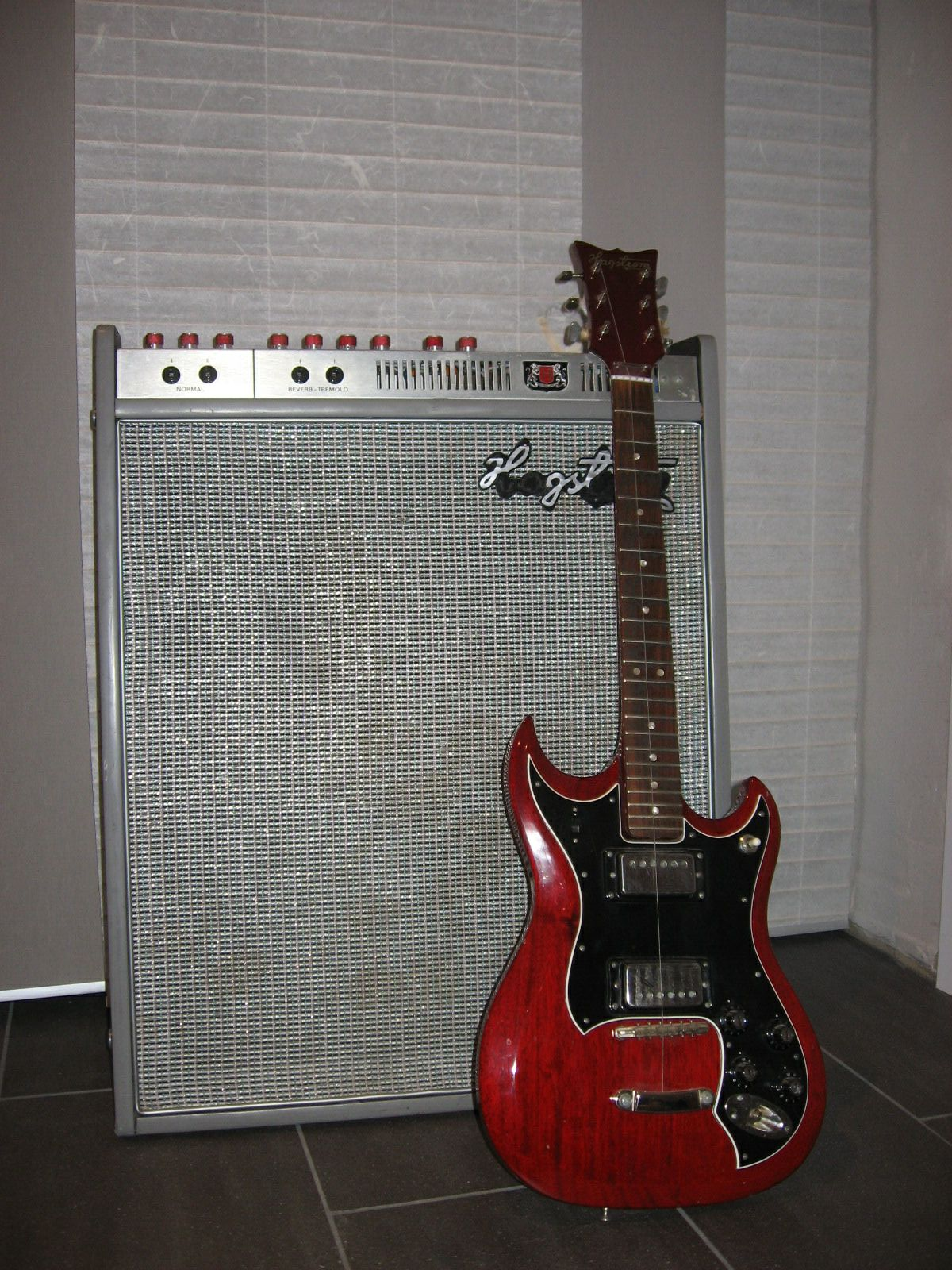
A vintage Hagström leaning against a Hagström amplifier combo

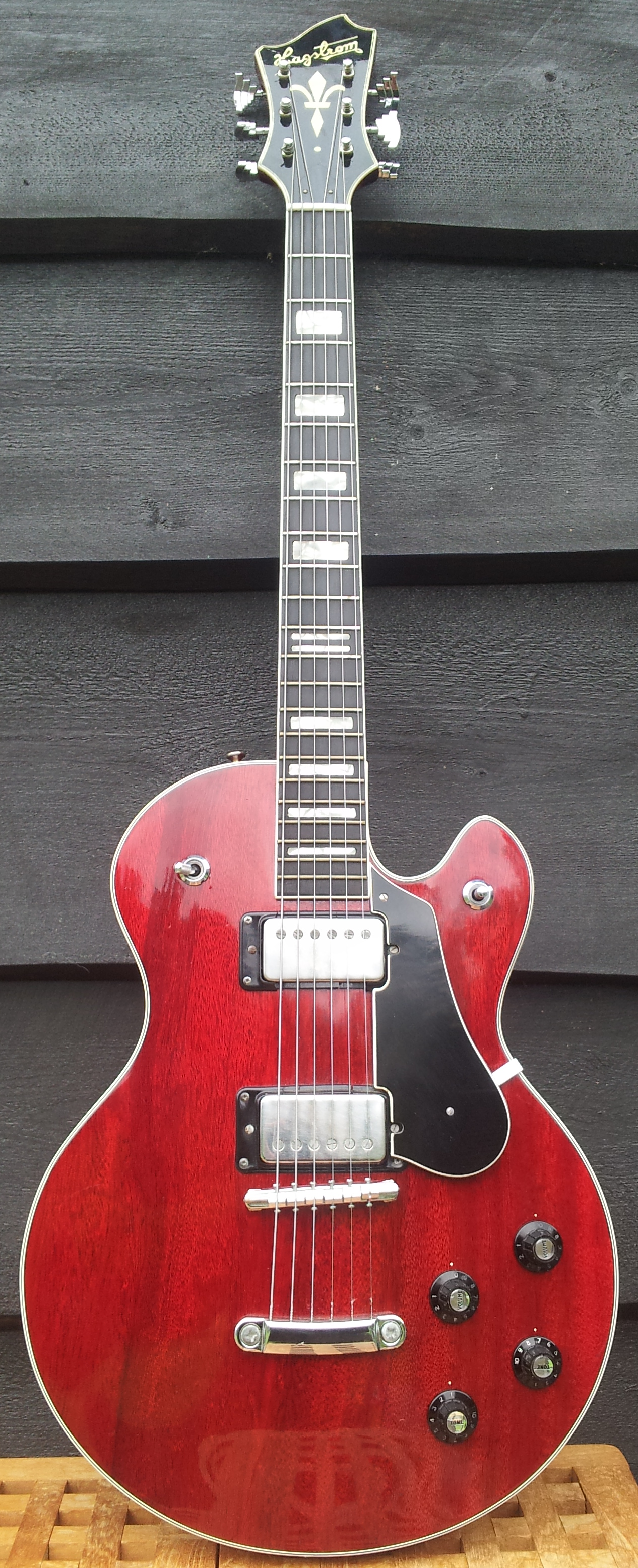
Vintage Swede (1974)

- Standard, DeLuxe and DeLuxe A, 1958–1962 – Sold in America under the name Goya (not to be confused with Goya guitars, acoustic guitars by Levin). Equipped with the Hagströms Speed-O-Matic fretboard, look similar to the Gibson Les Paul. Sometimes called The Glitter Guitars. DeLuxe A was nicknamed the Batman because of its unusual look.
- Kent, Kent I and Kent II, 1962–1966 – Sold in America as Hagström F-11, F-200 or F-300, and in England as Futurama. The first Hagström guitar with the "Tremar" tremolo system as standard. Inspired by the Fender Stratocaster.
- Hagström Futurama Coronado Automatic, 1963. 200 built specially by Hagström to the requirements of Ben Davis – owner of the Selmer company in London.
- Automatic, Impala and Corvette, 1963–1967 – Automatic was a cross between the Impala and the Corvette. The Corvette was named the Condor in America. All models had a glued neck.
- Hagström I, II and III, 1964–1976 – Gibson SG-inspired body with a Fender-style headstock. Hagström II and III were sold in America as the F-200 and F-300. The later model H-IIN had the same body, but two humbucking pickups, and rotary knobs instead of slide switches. The H-IIN-OT lacked the tremolo tail.
- Viking, Viking 1, Viking II, Viking DeLuxe and Viking I N, 1965–1979 – Hagströms first semi-hollow guitar. With the Viking I N he pickups were changed from single-coils to humbuckers.
- Hagström Jimmy, 1969–1979 – Semihollow guitar designed by Jimmy D´Aquisto, available with a regular or oval F-hole.
- Swede and Super Swede, 1970–1983 – Last model to be manufactured in Älvdalen. Inspired by the Gibson Les Paul. Super Swede was originally named Swede DeLuxe, but the name was changed after being called the Super Swede in a music magazine.
- Scandi, 1976–1980 – Stratocaster-inspired model with three single coil pickups. Also called Hagström III and built in a small run for left-handed players.
- Swede Patch 2000, 1976–1979 – A hybrid between a guitar and a synthesizer, required a special technique to play and was very hard to play.
- Partner, 1979 – Like the later humbucker version of Hagström II, but with a wraparound bridge/tailpiece.
- Ultra Swede, 1983 – Produced in Japan to cut costs but didn't live up to Hagströms standards.

=== Hagström Bass Guitars ===
- Hagström Standard and DeLuxe Bass, 1961 – Hagströms first bass. Based on the designs of their guitars and equipped with Hagström's Speed-O-Matic fretboard.
- Kent, 1962 – Sold in America as the Hagström FB.
- Coronado IV and VI, 1963 – available with 4 or 6 strings. also fitted with the Hagströms Speed-O-Matic fretboard.
- Concord and Concord De Luxe, 1965 – semi-hollow bass.
- Hagström II B, 1965
- Hagström H8, 1967 – The world's first 8 string bass.
- Hagström Jazz Bass, 1973–1977
- Hagström Scanbass, 1979 – Fretless bass.
- Super Swede Bass, 1980 – Last bass built by Hagström in Sweden.

=== Decoding Serial Numbers ===
1. Hagstrom used a 6 or 7digit serial number on production (1963–1983) electric guitar and bass models.

2. The first 3 digits of the serial number indicate the manufacturing Production Run number. The remainder of the number is the sequence number for that unit (guitar or bass) within the production run. The format is PPPNNNN where PPP is the production run number and NNN or NNNN is the sequence number within that production run.

3. Hagstrom did keep detailed records for each unit produced, and there is a book to that effect but not widely available. you may want to seek it out. Without the book you may be able to determine the year however.

Here are some real-world examples:

a. Some serial numbers reveal a clear-cut result. For example, serial number 618324 is from the production run 618 which consisted of 1000 Hagstrom II guitars started and completed in 1964. Therefore, all units with a 618NNNN serial number are from the year 1964.

b. However, others are less clear. For example, serial number 680873 is a Viking V-1 and the 873rd guitar made in production run 680. That run started in 1965 and completed in 1966. 1000 units were made in that run, so it is impossible with existing records to know if this guitar was actually made in 1965 or made in 1966. We know that this sequence number (873) is a high number in relation to the total of 1000 guitars produced in the run. We can therefore make the guess that it was most likely produced in 1966. The best that can be said in this instance is that the actual manufacture date is no earlier than 1965 and no later than 1966.

4. Serial numbers were etched on the guitar neck backing plate where the neck is joined to the body. There are instances where the serial number appeared on the input jack plate (seen on a Hagstrom Swede from 1973)as well. This may have been common and an alternative serial number location.

5. In 1975/76 the numbers “53” were added as a prefix to the serial number (53 PPPNNNN) and should be ignored for decoding purposes.

6. Production run numbers are in general sequential with some exceptions. In a real-world example: Production runs 706, 707, 708, 709, 711, 712, 713, 714, 715, 716, and 718 are verified to have all started in 1967. It can then be predicted that runs 710 and 717 also started in 1967, if those runs occurred. The likelihood of the start date being consistent relative to those adjacent to it is considered high but caution should be used as this may not always have been true.

7. Any serial number beginning with the digits "500" indicates the model is a prototype.

=== Partial Serial Number List ===
Production Run Data (Principal Contributor Thornton Davis)
Production Run	PR Start Year	PR End Year	Model	Total in PR	Notes
021	1977	1977/78	Hagstrom Swede	600	
025	1978	1978	Hagstrom "Jimmy" With f-hole	100	
026	1978	1978	Hagstrom "Jimmy" With oval hole	100	
055	1979	1979	Viking V-1	245	Production run 055 was the very last run of the Viking model
056	1979	1979	"Hagstrom "Jimmy" With f-hole	302	Designed by James d'Aquisto for Hagstrom in the mid 70's as a jazz guitar
057	1979	1979	Hagstrom "Jimmy" With oval hole	100	Designed by James d'Aquisto for Hagstrom in the mid 70's as a jazz guitar
065	1980	1980	Hagstrom Super Swede	300	The first production run for the Super Swede
076	1980	1981	Hagstrom Super Swede	250	
077	1980	1982	Hagstrom Swede	127	077 was one of the very last production runs that the factory produced before closing
078	1983	1983	Hagstrom Super Swede	250	Very Last production run
079	1979	1979	Hagstrom Swede	250	This run never occurred or was canceled
449	1958	1959	Hagstrom Deluxe	197	The earliest Hagstrom production run on record produced Hagstrom Deluxe guitars. The Deluxe has a sparkle finish and Maple neck push button tone controls located on the upper bout in a single cutaway style body. It has 4 pickups paired in twos at the neck and at the bridge.
500			Prototype		All prototype Hagstrom guitars and basses were given the serial batch number 500. So if you happen upon one bearing the serial number 500xxx you know it's a prototype.
543			Hagstrom I		
545	1963		Hagstrom III Futurama	1002	
550	1963	1964	Hagstrom Coronado IV	149	
574	1963	1964	Futurama	1000	"Futurama" is the predecessor to the Hagstrom-1
575	1964	1964	Kent Bass	500	
584	1963	1964	Futurama	990	
587	1964	1964	"""Hagstrom"" bass"	500	
589	1964	1965	Coronado Bass	200	Often labeled Coronado IV on the Headstock
600	1964	1964	PB-24-G	200	PB-24-G (pre model change to Hagstrom-1)
601	1964	1964	Hagstrom III Futurama		
603	1964	1964	Hagstrom I		Predicted to have started in 1964 based on adjacency of similarly numbered runs
604	1964	1964	Futurama		
608	1964		Hagstrom II		Predicted to have started in 1964 based on adjacency of similarly numbered runs
609	1964	1964	Hagstrom Bass	500	
610	1964	1965	Hagstrom II (F-200 USA)	1000	
618	1964	1964	Hagstrom II	1000	
619	1965	1965	Hagstrom II-B		
620	1964	1965	Kent-1	1000	
621	1964	1964	Kent 1-B	500	
624	1964	1964	Hagstrom III (F-300 USA)	1000	Hagstrom De Luxe III
625	1965	1965	Hagstrom Deluxe	500	
632	1965		Hagstrom II		Predicted to have started in 1965 based on adjacency of similarly numbered runs
633	1965	1965	Hagstrom II-B	500	Hagstrom Deluxe bass
638	1965	1966	Hagstrom 12		
639	1965	1966	Kent-1	3202	The factory production identifies run 639 as being "Kent 1". The guitar should have the rounded p/u's The factory changed to the squared off p/u's in 1966. Lavender was a standard finish. If it has both logos its possible the guitar is a "transition model" that contains both features and logos from the Kent 1 and the Hagstrom 1. Run 639 was the very last run of the Kent 1 model and they may have run out of the Kent logos and therefore used the Hagstrom logo. The Kent 1 model was replaced with the Hagstrom 1 when run 639 finished.
640	1965	1966	Kent 1-B	1300	Kent Bass Last run for the Kent 1-B
647	1965	1967	Concord Standard C1 Bass	999	
650	1965	1966	Hagstrom I	2497	
651	1966	1966	Hagstrom I-B	1000	
652	1965	1965	Hagstrom II (F-200 USA)	1000	
653	1965	1966	Hagstrom III		
654	1965	1966	Hagstrom II-B		
656	1965	1965	Hagstrom III	1000	
658	1966	1967	Coronado IV		
659	1966	1966	Hagstrom III (F-300 USA)	100	This run was all Left handed models
660	1966	1966	Hagstrom II-BN	1000	Hagstrom-12 (H12)
663	1966	1966	Hagstrom 12 (F-125 USA)	960	12 string guitar
668	1966	1967	Hagstrom 12	999	12 string guitar
669	1966	1966	Hagstrom I	958	
671	1966	1966	Hagstrom II (F-200 USA)	1000	
672	1966	1966	Hagstrom II (F-200 USA)	1000	
673	1966	1967	Hagstrom II (F-200 USA)	999	
674	1967	1967	Hagstrom II (F-200 USA)	999	
675	1966	1966	Hagstrom III (F-300 USA)	1001	
676	1966	Unknown	Hagstrom III (F-300 USA)	1000	
677	1966	1967	Hagstrom III (F-300 USA)	999	
678	1966	1966	Hagstrom II-B	1098	
679	1966	1967	Hagstrom II-B	1003	
680	1965	1966	Viking V-1	1000	
690	1966	1967	Hagstrom IB bass	1162	
693	1966	1966	Viking V-1	1000	
695	1966	1967	Viking V-1	1000	
696	1966	1967	Concord Standard C1 Bass	1000	
699	1966	1967	Hagstrom III (F-300 USA)	1000	
700			Hagstrom II-B		
706	1967	1967	Hagstrom 12 (F-125 USA)	1000	
707	1967	1968	Hagstrom II (F-200 USA)	1000	
708	1967	1968	Hagstrom II (F-200 USA)	Unknown	
709	1967	1967	Hagstrom III (F-300 USA)	997	
710	1967				Predicted to have started in 1967 based on adjacency of similarly numbered runs
711	1967	1969	Hagstrom II-B		
712	1967	1967	Viking V-1	999	The standard Viking with 6 inline tuners on the headstock
713	1967	1967	Viking V-1	1039	
714	1967	1967	Viking V-1	1001	
715	1967	1967	Viking V-2	1001	
716	1967	1971	Concord Standard C1 Bass	750	There were 3 runs (647-696-716) of the standard Concord between 1965 and 1971 which produced a total of 2749 basses
717	1967				Predicted to have started in 1967 based on adjacency of similarly numbered runs
718	1967	1967	Concord Bass C2 Deluxe		
723	1967	1968	Hagstrom 8 String	600	
726	1968	1969	Hagstrom III (F-300 USA)	650	
731	1968	1968	Viking V-1	1000	
732	1967	1968	Viking V-2		
733	1968	1968	Concord Bass C2 Deluxe		
768	1969	1970	Hagstrom II-N (HIIN / F-200N USA)	250	First run of this model mixed headstocks in this run.
770	1970	1970	LP	50	First Run of the Swede L.P. (Les Paul). The name was change to Swede in 1971
778	1970	1970	Hagstrom II	100	
784	1970	1970	Hagstrom III (F-300 USA)	955	
787	1970	1970	Hagstrom I	200	Considered a rare model due to limited production
788	1970	Unknown	Hagstrom II-N (HIIN / F-200N USA)		All HIIN in this run had the two sided headstock, presumably 1970
789	1970	1971	LP	200	Production runs 789 & 797 ran back to back, afterward changed the model to the Swede
790	1971	1971	Hagstrom II-BN	400	
797	1971	1971	LP	200	
804	1971	1971	Hagstrom II-N (HIIN / F-200N USA)	500	
806	1970	1972	Hagstrom III		
811	1971	1971	Hagstrom Swede	150	
812	1971	1971	Hagstrom I-B	150	Bass made for Canadian dealer ARC Sound as "student basses" w/ low price also called model F100B. A total of 652 in 4 production runs between 1971 and 1973 were produced. When ARC Sound went out of business the remaining H-1-B basses in the factory inventory were sold to their UK and European dealers as the F100B.
814	1971	1971	Hagstrom Swede	150	
815	1971	1972	Hagstrom Swede Bass	250	
821	1971	1972	Hagstrom Swede Bass	300	
822	1972	1972	Hagstrom II		
828	1972	1972	Viking V-1N	200	
836	1971	1971	Hagstrom 1 B	102	
839	1972	1972	Viking V-1N	200	Viking-1N features the 3+3 headstock and humbucker pickups. A second toggle switch appears on this model (the 2nd generation of the Viking). The two toggle switches are the pickup selector and the "tone control" which is a phase control for either series or parallel.
846	1972	1973	Hagstrom II-B	277	
849	1972	1972	Hagstrom II-N (HIIN / F-200N USA)	15	
851	1972	1973	Hagstrom Swede	200	
852	1972	1972	Viking V-1N	Unknown	The Viking-1N features a 3+3 headstock and humbucker pickups
853	1972	1972	Hagstrom 1 B	200	
859	1972	1972	Hagstrom II-N (HIIN / F-200N USA)	500	The Hagstrom II-N is the factories version of Gibson SG body shape. H-II-N-OT does not have the vibrato tailpiece
865	1973	1973	Hagstrom 1 B	200	
869	1973	1973	Hagstrom Swede	300	
871	1973	1973	Viking V-1N	252	The Viking-1N features a 3+3 headstock and humbucker pickups
888	1973	1973	Hagstrom Swede	300	
895	1974	1974	Hagstrom Swede	500	
905	1974	1974	Hagstrom Swede	500	
910	1974	1974	Hagstrom Swede	500	
913	1974	1975	Hagstrom Swede	500	
929	1975	1975	Hagstrom II-B-NV	10	
932	1975	1975	Hagstrom Swede	500	Total is for Standard Swede and does not include Super or Ultra Swede
933	1974	1975	Hagstrom Swede Bass	500	
934	1975	1975	Hagstrom Swede Bass	500	
938	1975	1976	Hagstrom Swede	500	
947	1975	1975	Viking V-1N	200	The Viking-1N features a 3+3 headstock and humbucker pickups
965	1977	1977	"Hagstrom "Jimmy"	200	
977	1976	1976	Hagstrom II-N (HIIN / F-200N USA)	250	
988	1977	1977	Hagstrom "Jazzbass"	75	

== Guitars: 2004 to present day ==
As of 2004, Hagström has been reopened for the international market being distributed by "Tricor AB". They are marketing new versions of a great number of the more famous models from Sweden. The official Hagström design team have taken certain liberties with the designs and made some improvements and other deviations from the original Swedish designs. Hagström has again started the production of more exclusive Hagstrom guitars within Europe, which have been specially developed to reproduce the sounds of the originals. These models are called the Northen Series. The Northen series instruments are no longer in production.

=== Current Hagström Guitars ===
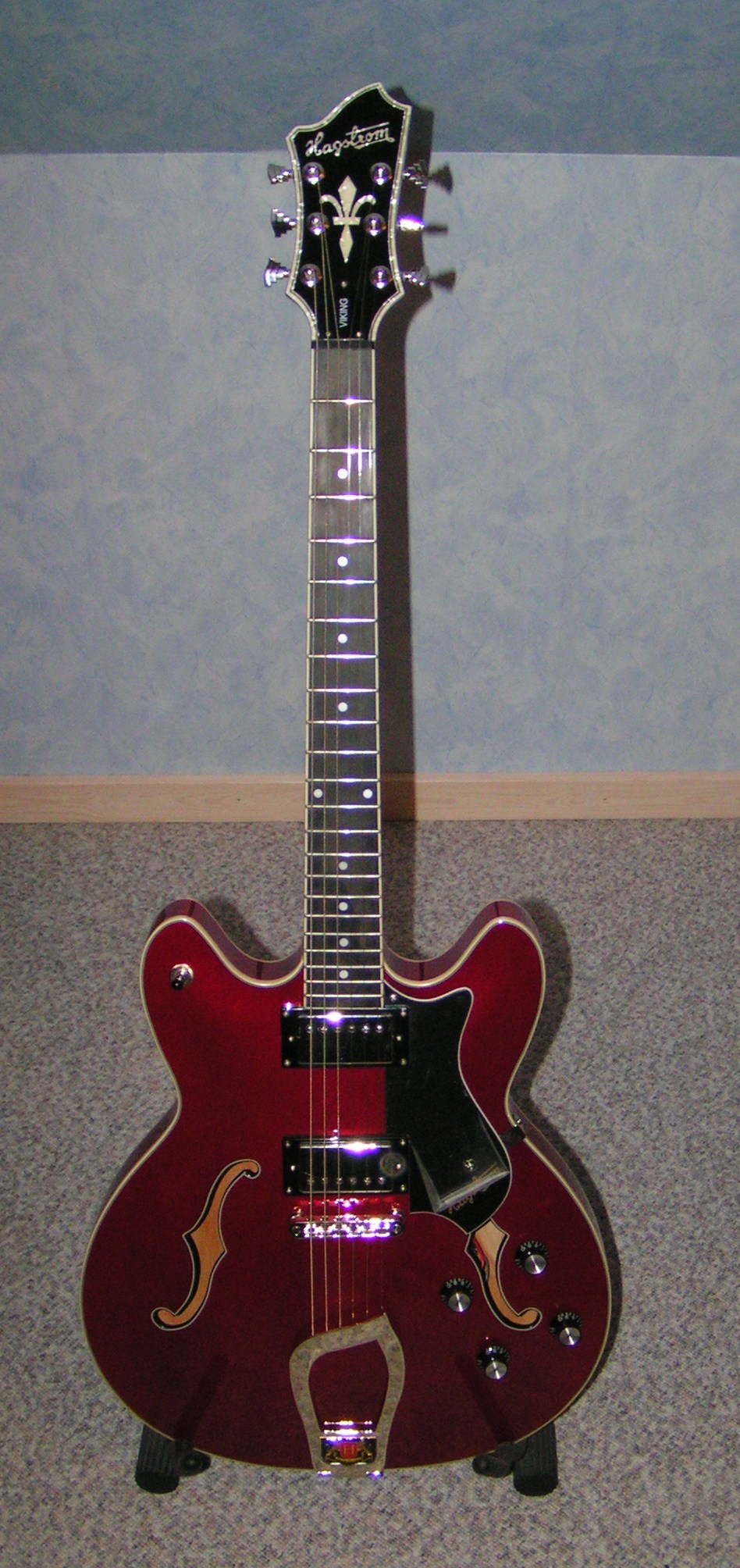
Viking model, one of the classic Hagström guitars that are currently being reproduced

- Deluxe D2H and Deluxe-F D2F. The Deluxe models come with two humbuckers and are single cutaway guitars. They have simple wiring with two potentiometers for master volume and tone control. These models were some of the first made when manufacturing resumed in 2004; however, they are no longer in production. The shape and dimensions of the D2H appear to have been based on that of the early [1958–62] pearloid-covered models such as the Standard 80 [pictured].
- Deuce and Deuce-F. The Deuce models come with two humbuckers and are dual cutaway guitars, where Hagstrom claims that these are siblings based upon the Super Swede model. Both guitars have independent push/pull tone pots for coil splitting each individual pickup.
- Fantomen. The Fantomen models come with two humbuckers and are asymmetrical in design closely resembling the Gibson RD. The models come with two volume and two push/pull tone pots. The Fantomen was designed in collaboration with Ghost.
- RetroScape. Hagstrom's RetroScape Series consist of authentically recreated guitars from Hagstrom's history. The intention being to bring modern playability to these great designs without compromising any of the retro-vibe. There are two ranges of guitars: the 3-pickup Condor (& its 2-pickup sister the Impala) and the 3-pickup H-III (along with 2-pickup H-II). All of these feature modified headstocks from the 1960s originals as well as an upgraded bridge and re-engineered “Vintage Tremar” vibrato for functional improvement.
- UltraLux Series XL-5 and Ultralux Series XL-2. The XL-5 comes with two humbuckers and one single coil pickup, the XL-2 is identical except it lacks the single coil pickup. Equipped with the FCS-2 bridge system.
- UltraLux Series Ultra Swede. Comes with a coil tap switch that gives the humbucker pickups a single coil sound when tapped. Also includes "Custom 62" pickups being considered a more aggressive and hot set of pickups. Two Special Edition models were manufactured. One was for the Nitro company who manufactures snowboards and the other for Absolut vodka.
- Select Super Swede, Select Swede and Select Ultra Swede. Identical except for the Select Super Swede's longer neck (25,5" compared to 24,75") and the Select Ultra Swede is available with Custom 58 uncovered pickups.
- Super Swede – Also offered as Tremar Super Swede, and Tremar Super Swede P-90 (equipped with 3 H-90-S pickups (N/RW/N)(S- Stands for "Spiced" which are specially voiced to provide more of an accentuated Single coil sound)) and a 6-way rotary switch. Hagstrom's "Tremar unit" is Hagstrom's special designed vintage "Tremar" tremolo system which is known to be one of the best "Vintage" type of tremolo units on the market.
- Swede. Also offered as Tremar Swede, and Swede-SE using Hagstrom's unique H-90-S pickups.
- F-20 and the F-200. The F-200 lacks the tremolo that comes with the F-20 as well as having a set mahogany neck compared to the maple bolt-on neck of the F-20. The F-20 has a one-piece 45 mm basswood body and uses the FCS-1 tremolo system. The F-200 has a 40mm contoured Mahogany body.
- F200P. Available with two H-90 Single coils and FCS-1 tremolo as standard.
- Viking, Viking II and Viking IIP. A reissue of the Hagström Viking, the Viking and the Deluxe are identical except for the Deluxe having a flamed top, different inlays on the fingerboard and a different F-hole. The Viking II is a model which uses a bolt-on neck opposed to the Viking which uses a set neck.
- HJ-500 and the HJ-600. A reissue of the original Hagström Jimmy. Tremar HJ-500 using Hagstrom's special designed vintage "Tremar" tremolo system on this model, being a popular choice for rockabilly guitarists, looking for a dependable tremolo unit.
- HL-550. Semi-hollow body with a single floating humbucker pickup.
- HJ-800. A reissue of the original Hagström Jimmy, equipped with a Solid Spruce top, Custom 58 pickups, and a 25" scale length.

=== Current Hagström Bass guitars ===
- HB-8. Re-issue of the original 8 string bass.
- HB-4.
- Viking Bass.
- FXB-200, -210, -220, -520, and -530
- Beluga II, IIF, III, and IIIF

== Guitars as collectibles ==
Ever since 1983, when original production stopped, Hagströms have been sought-after collector's items. Pat Smear is known for having one of the largest Hagström collections in America and reportedly claimed that Hagströms are the most roadworthy guitars he's ever used. The world's largest collection of Hagström guitars was previously owned by Arne Johansson in Östersund, Sweden and consisted of more than 80 Hagström guitars plus a number of amplifiers and other instruments and Hagström products. The entire collection was bought by the publicly owned museum of the Dalarna province, that owned a smaller collection of instruments, on 4 May 2012. Their collection now consists of more than 100 Hagström guitars.

The red Viking II that Elvis Presley played on Elvis Presley's '68 Comeback Special was sold in the early 1990s for more than $50,000 and was on display at the Museum of Modern Art in New York. A 1981 Super Swede with custom blue-and-yellow graphics was sold for 60,100 Swedish kronor (approx. US$8,850), making it one of the most expensive Hagströms ever sold.

The Guitar Collection features a rare Hagström Futurama Coronado automatic.

== Notable users ==
- Elvis Presley – 68 Comeback Special
- John Lennon - Sky Arts programme "Above us Only Sky
- Elias Bender Rønnenfelt – Iceage
- Kurt Cobain – Nirvana
- David Bowie – Rebel Rebel music video, and in various bands.
- Pat Smear – Nirvana, Foo Fighters, and the Germs
- Aaron North – The Icarus Line, Nine Inch Nails and Jubilee (band)
- Noel Redding – The Jimi Hendrix Experience
- Randy Meisner - Eagles One of These Nights tour
- Joe Walsh – Eagles, James Gang, Barnstorm
- Rutger Gunnarsson – ABBA, played and designed the Hagström Super Swede Bass
- Stu Mackenzie – King Gizzard and the Lizard Wizard
- Björn Ulvaeus – ABBA
- Frank Zappa – The Mothers of Invention and Captain Beefheart
- Dweezil Zappa- Zappa Plays Zappa
- Bob Hardy – Franz Ferdinand
- Nick McCarthy – Franz Ferdinand
- Jimi Hendrix – The Jimi Hendrix Experience
- Luis Alberto Spinetta
- Ryan Ross – Panic! at the Disco and The Young Veins
- Josh Homme – Kyuss, Queens of the Stone Age and Them Crooked Vultures
- Frances McKee – The Vaselines
- Kevin Parker – Tame Impala

+ titin Naves 113 vicios y Palo Pandolfo ( hagstrom 1966)

- Daryl Stuermer – Jean-Luc Ponty
- Doc Forrester – Archie Bell & the Drells- and many more
- Nameless Ghoul – Ghost

¨

== Media ==
- Hagström – Allt i musik. Swedish documentary film, first broadcast in 2004 by the K Special television show on SVT2 in Sweden.

LO USO Avelino Naves en la Banda 113 vicios, hagstrom 1966 bass
