= Deaths in July 2012 =

The following is a list of notable deaths in July 2012.

Entries for each day are listed alphabetically by surname. A typical entry lists information in the following sequence:

- Name, age, country of citizenship and reason for notability, established cause of death, reference (and language of reference, if not English).

== July 2012 ==
=== 1 ===
- José Míguez Bonino, 88, Argentine theologian.
- Joseph Cropsey, 92, American political philosopher.
- Dennis Eagan, 85, British hockey player and soldier.
- Conrade Gamble, 45, American actor and stuntman.
- Loyd Gentry Jr., 87, American horse trainer.
- Peter E. Gillquist, 73, American archpriest (Antiochian Orthodox Christian Archdiocese of North America), melanoma.
- Mike Hershberger, 72, American baseball player (Chicago White Sox, Kansas City Athletics).
- Ossie Hibbert, 62, Jamaican musician, heart attack.
- Evelyn Lear, 86, American opera singer.
- Walter Lienert, 87, American Olympic gymnastics coach and judge.
- Fritz Pauer, 68, Austrian jazz pianist and composer.
- Alan G. Poindexter, 50, American NASA astronaut, jet ski accident.
- Jack Richardson, 78, American playwright and author.
- Odd Todnem, 89, Norwegian engineer.

=== 2 ===
- Usman Albishir, 67, Nigerian senator, car accident.
- Jack A. Beaver, 93, American soldier.
- John E. Brooks, 88, American priest and educator, President of the College of the Holy Cross (1970–1994), lymphoma.
- Maurice Chevit, 88, French actor.
- Lisbet Dæhlin, 90, Danish-born Norwegian ceramist.
- Bhanwar Singh Dangawas, 91, Indian politician.
- Ben Davidson, 72, American football player (Oakland Raiders) and actor (Conan the Barbarian), prostate cancer.
- Edith Newman Devlin, 85, Irish lecturer.
- Gunnar Eide, 92, Norwegian actor and theatre director.
- Julian Goodman, 90, American broadcasting executive, President of NBC (1966–1974).
- Tsutomu Koyama, 75, Japanese volleyball player and coach, Olympic bronze medalist (1964), esophageal cancer.
- Angelo Mangiarotti, 91, Italian architect and industrial designer.
- Betty Meggers, 90, American archaeologist.
- Ed Stroud, 72, American baseball player (Chicago White Sox, Washington Senators).
- Ben Van Os, 67, Dutch production designer and art director (Girl with a Pearl Earring), throat cancer.

=== 3 ===
- Dave Allan, 47, British auto racing driver, car accident.
- William Biddick Jr., 92, American politician.
- Nguyễn Hữu Có, 87, Vietnamese general and political prisoner, Deputy Prime Minister and Defense Minister of South Vietnam (1965–1967), diabetes.
- Andy Griffith, 86, American actor (The Andy Griffith Show, Matlock, Waitress), heart attack.
- Hugó Gruber, 74, Hungarian actor.
- Leo Kersley, 92, British dancer and teacher.
- Yvonne B. Miller, 77, American politician, first African-American female legislator of Virginia, stomach cancer.
- Sergio Pininfarina, 85, Italian senator for life and automotive designer (Ferrari, Alfa Romeo, Fiat).
- Hollie Stevens, 30, American pornographic actress and model, cancer.
- Richard A. Tonry, 77, American politician and lawyer, U.S. Representative from Louisiana (1977), natural causes.
- Joseph Triay, 80, Gibraltarian lawyer and politician.
- Daphne Zepos, 52, Greek-born American author and chef, lung cancer.

=== 4 ===
- Fareeda Kokikhel Afridi, 25, Pakistani women's rights activist, shot.
- Robert P. Atkinson, 84, American bishop.
- Peter Bennett, 85, Australian football player and Olympic (1952, 1956) water polo player.
- Hiren Bhattacharyya, 80, Indian poet, lung infection.
- Paul Birch, 56, British scientist and author.
- Jimmy Bivins, 92, American heavyweight boxer, pneumonia.
- J.D. Garrett, 70, American football player.
- Benedetto Ghiglia, 90, Italian composer (I Knew Her Well, Pigsty, To Forget Venice), conductor and pianist.
- Vinzenz Guggenberger, 83, German Roman Catholic prelate, Auxiliary Bishop of Regensburg (1972–2004).
- Jeong Min-hyeong, 25, South Korean football player, suicide by carbon monoxide poisoning.
- Karen R. Keesling, 65, American civil servant, Assistant Secretary of the Air Force (1988–1989).
- Sam Ojebode, 67, Nigerian footballer.
- Scamper, 35, American barrel racing horse.
- Eric Sykes, 89, British writer and actor (The Goon Show, Sykes, Harry Potter and the Goblet of Fire).

=== 5 ===
- Barun Biswas, 39, Indian school teacher and activist, shot.
- Howard Dorgan, 80, American academic.
- Rob Goris, 30, Belgian ice hockey player and cyclist, heart attack.
- Dick Greco, 87, American baseball player.
- Ruud van Hemert, 73, Dutch film director, cancer.
- Roland Hyatt, 50, Australian cricketer.
- Gerrit Komrij, 68, Dutch writer, cancer.
- Angeliki Koutsonikoli, 23, Greek cyclist.
- Colin Marshall, Baron Marshall of Knightsbridge, 78, British businessman and life peer.
- Bob Rowland Smith, 86, Australian politician, NSW Minister for Sport and Recreation (1988–1991).
- Márta Tolnai-Erdős, 70, Hungarian Olympic gymnast.

=== 6 ===
- Ibrahim Balandiya, Sudanese politician, shot.
- Betty Buehler, 90, American actress.
- Charles Drake, 30, American football player (New York Giants).
- Charles David Ganao, 85, Congolese politician, Prime Minister (1996–1997).
- Hani al-Hassan, 74, Palestinian politician and diplomat, complications of a stroke.
- Bruce B. Kendall, 93, American hotelier and politician.
- Alice Koroma, 80, Sierra Leonean politician, mother of president Ernest Bai Koroma.
- James McKinley, 67, American football coach and businessman.
- Bill Norrie, 83, Canadian politician and educator, Mayor of Winnipeg (1979–1992), Chancellor of the University of Manitoba (2001–2009), respiratory failure.
- Angelo Paternoster, 93, American football player (Washington Redskins).
- Sebastijan Pečjak, 35, Slovenian darts player, traffic collision.
- Anthony Sedlak, 29, Canadian chef, suicide by drug overdose.
- Al Ulbrickson, 81, American rower.
- Skylar Annette Neese, 16, American honors student, homicide by stabbing.

=== 7 ===
- David Baldwin, 90, New Zealand bowls player.
- Renato Beghe, 79, American judge (United States Tax Court).
- Paul Coussa, 94, Syrian-born Iraqi Armenian Catholic hierarch, Archbishop of Baghdad (1983–2001).
- Ronaldo Cunha Lima, 76, Brazilian poet and politician, Governor of Paraíba (1991–1994), lung cancer.
- Mouss Diouf, 47, Senegalese-born French comedian, complications of a stroke.
- Tatsuo Endō, 85, Japanese actor.
- Dennis Flemion, 57, American rock musician (The Frogs), drowned.
- Colin Lamont, 70, Australian politician, member of the Queensland Legislative Assembly (1974–1977).
- Ralph Raymond Loffmark, 92, Canadian politician.
- Luis López, 88, Chilean footballer.
- Doris Neal, 83, American baseball player (AAGPBL).
- Jerry Norman, 75, American sinologist and linguist, idiopathic pulmonary fibrosis.
- José Pauwels, 84, Belgian Olympic cyclist.
- Alf Pearson, 102, British variety performer with his brother Bob as half of Bob and Alf Pearson.
- Leon Schlumpf, 87, Swiss politician, Member of the Federal Council (1979–1987), President of the Confederation (1984).
- Jimmy Tansey, 83, English football player.

=== 8 ===
- Muhammed bin Saud Al Saud, 78, Saudi royal and politician, Minister of Defense (1960–1962), Governor of Al Baha (1987–2010).
- Chris Barber, 91, British businessman, chairman of Oxfam (1983–1989).
- Lionel Batiste, 81, American jazz musician (Treme Brass Band).
- John Nelson Battenberg, 80, American sculptor.
- Leszek Berger, 87, Polish herpetologist and malacologist.
- Osvaldo Blasi, 84, Argentine Olympic wrestler.
- Ernest Borgnine, 95, American actor (Marty, McHale's Navy, From Here to Eternity), Oscar winner (1956), renal failure.
- Claudio Carudel, 74, French-born Spanish jockey.
- Henry Chilver, Baron Chilver, 86, British engineer and politician.
- Aleksandr Chumakov, 64, Russian Soviet football player.
- Gyang Dalyop Datong, 53, Nigerian politician, Member of the House of Representatives (2003–2007), Senator (since 2007), heart attack.
- Dick Fowler, 80, Canadian politician, Member of the Legislative Assembly of Alberta (1989–1993).
- Philip L. Fradkin, 77, American historian and author, cancer.
- Arnold B. Grobman, 93, American zoologist.
- Rodger Head, 73, Australian football player (St Kilda Football Club).
- William Innes Homer, 82, American art historian.
- Martin Pakledinaz, 58, American costume designer (My Week with Marilyn), cancer.
- Stuart R. Schram, 88, American physicist and political scientist.
- Boris Shramko, 92, Ukrainian historian.
- John Williams, 64, American football player (Baltimore Colts, Los Angeles Rams).

=== 9 ===
- Azah Aziz, 83, Malaysian cultural figure, stroke.
- Dino Cassio, 78, Italian actor and singer.
- Mario de Leon Baltazar, 85, Filipino Roman Catholic priest, Prelate of Batanes and the Babuyan Islands (1966–1995).
- Kenny Heitz, 65, American basketball player (UCLA), cancer.
- Chick King, 81, American baseball player (Detroit Tigers, Chicago Cubs, St. Louis Cardinals).
- Sir Terepai Maoate, 78, Cook Islands politician, Prime Minister (1999–2002), prostate cancer.
- Jacqueline Mazéas, 91, French Olympic bronze medallist discus athlete (1948).
- Miinnehoma, 29, Irish-bred racehorse, winner of the 1994 Grand National. (death announced on this date)
- René Joseph Rakotondrabé, 79, Malagasy Roman Catholic prelate, Bishop of Toamasina (1989–2008).
- Denise René, 99, French art dealer.
- Zsuzsi Roboz, 72, Hungarian painter.
- Eugênio Sales, 91, Brazilian Roman Catholic prelate, Cardinal Protopriest, Archbishop of Rio de Janeiro (1971–2001), heart failure.
- Shin Jae-chul, 75, South Korean-born American martial artist.
- Brian Thomas, 72, Welsh rugby union player and manager (Neath RFC).
- Isuzu Yamada, 95, Japanese actress (Yojimbo, Throne of Blood, Flowing), multiple organ failure.

=== 10 ===
- Maria Cole, 89, American jazz singer, widow of Nat King Cole, cancer.
- Michele Columbu, 98, Italian politician and writer.
- Lol Coxhill, 79, English jazz saxophonist, after short illness.
- Dolphy, 83, Filipino actor and comedian, multiple organ failure.
- Marian Filar, 94, Polish-born American concert pianist.
- Peter Fisher, 68, American author and gay rights activist, suicide.
- Cheryll Heinze, 65, American politician, member of the Alaska House of Representatives (2002–2004), plane crash.
- Peter Kyros, 86, American politician, Representative from Maine (1967–1975).
- Gaylon Lawrence, 78, American businessman.
- Berthe Meijer, 74, Dutch author, cancer.
- Viktor Suslin, 70, Russian composer.

=== 11 ===
- Jean Allister, 80, English opera singer.
- Bjørn Blakstad, 86, Norwegian diplomat.
- Dewayne Bunch, 50, American politician, member of the Kentucky House of Representatives (2010–2011), head injuries.
- Art Ceccarelli, 82, American baseball player (Kansas City Athletics, Chicago Cubs, Baltimore Orioles), cancer.
- Héctor Cornejo Chávez, 93, Peruvian politician.
- Marion Cunningham, 90, American cookbook author, complications of Alzheimer's disease.
- Sir Carron Greig, 87, British business executive.
- Rutger Kopland, 77, Dutch poet, writer, and psychiatrist.
- Joe McBride, 74, Scottish football player (Celtic), complications of a stroke.
- Bobby Nicol, 76, Scottish football player (Hibernian).
- Richard Scudder, 99, American newspaper pioneer, founder of MediaNews Group.
- Harold Shukman, 81, British historian.
- André Simon, 92, French racing driver.
- Donald J. Sobol, 87, American writer (Encyclopedia Brown), gastric lymphoma.
- Sir Saxon Tate, 80, British businessman.
- Marvin Traub, 87, American business executive, CEO of Bloomingdale's, bladder cancer.

=== 12 ===
- Joan Albert, 69, American artist, heart attack.
- Alimuddin, 81, Pakistani Test cricketer.
- Cassandra Balchin, 50, British journalist and women's rights campaigner, cancer.
- Eddy Brown, 86, English footballer (Birmingham City).
- Hattie Canty, 79, American labor activist.
- Fest Cotton, 62, American football player.
- Cleveland Elam, 60, American football player (San Francisco 49ers, Detroit Lions).
- Maita Gomez, 65, Filipino beauty queen and activist, Miss Philippines–World (1967), heart attack.
- Pier Luigi Mazzoni, 79, Italian Roman Catholic prelate, Archbishop of Gaeta (1997–2007).
- Else Holmelund Minarik, 91, Danish-born American author (Little Bear), complications from a heart attack.
- Roger Payne, 55, British mountaineer, avalanche.
- M. Anto Peter, 45, Indian computer scientist and technical writer, heart attack.
- Hamid Samandarian, 81, Iranian film and theater director, liver cancer.
- Dara Singh, 84, Indian wrestler and actor, multiple organ failure.
- George C. Stoney, 96, American documentary filmmaker and pioneer of public-access television.
- Denis Warner, 94, Australian journalist and historian.

=== 13 ===
- Bucky Adams, 75, Canadian saxophonist.
- Shlomo Bentin, 65, Israeli neuropsychologist, recipient of the 2012 Israel Prize in psychology, traffic collision.
- Harry Betts, 89, American jazz composer and trombonist.
- Polde Bibič, 79, Slovenian actor and politician.
- Sir Christopher Booth, 88, British clinician and medical historian.
- Robert Werner Duemling, 83, American diplomat.
- Warren Jabali, 65, American basketball player (Oakland Oaks), heart failure.
- Jerzy Kulej, 71, Polish politician, Olympic gold medal-winning (1964 and 1968) boxer, heart attack.
- Ian Little, 93, British economist.
- Wayne Massarelli, 62, American makeup artist (The Muppets Take Manhattan, My Fellow Americans, The One), liver cancer.
- Rolf Nilssen, 84, Norwegian politician.
- Pan Jiazheng, 84, Chinese hydraulic engineer.
- Hanifa Safi, Afghan politician, bomb blast.
- Sage Stallone, 36, American actor (Rocky V), heart attack.
- Jerold Starr, 71, American sociologist.
- Ginny Tyler, 86, American voice actress (Davey and Goliath, Fantastic Four, Space Ghost).
- Richard D. Zanuck, 77, American film producer (Jaws, Driving Miss Daisy, Road to Perdition), Oscar winner (1990), heart attack.

=== 14 ===
- John Arbuthnott, 16th Viscount of Arbuthnott, 87, Scottish peer.
- Barton Biggs, 79, American businessman, bacterial infection.
- Don Brinkley, 91, American television writer (The Fugitive, The F.B.I., Trapper John, M.D.), natural causes.
- Frank R. Burns, 84, American football player and coach (Rutgers University), natural causes.
- Ennio Cardoni, 83, Italian footballer.
- Bohuslav Ceplecha, 35, Czech rally co-driver, race incident.
- Philip Crosland, 93, British journalist.
- Mohamed el-Bisatie, 74, Egyptian novelist and short story writer, liver disease.
- Victor Gaskin, 77, American jazz bassist.
- King Hill, 75, American football player (Philadelphia Eagles), cancer.
- Sir David House, 89, British Army lieutenant general, Military Cross recipient and Black Rod (1978–1985).
- Sixten Jernberg, 83, Swedish cross-country skier, Olympic gold medalist (1956, 1960, 1964), cancer.
- Ahmad Khan Samangani, 54–55, Afghan politician, member of the House of the People (since 2011), bomb blast.
- Roy Shaw, 76, British businessman and boxer.
- Enrique Silva Cimma, 93, Chilean politician, Foreign Minister (1990–1994), bronchial obstruction.
- Sidney Oslin Smith Jr., 88, American former chief judge of the District Court for the Northern District of Georgia, cancer.

=== 15 ===
- Wahab Ashrafi, 76, Indian literary critic.
- Jerry H. Bentley, 62, American academic and professor, pancreatic cancer.
- Boris Cebotari, 37, Moldovan footballer, apparent suicide by jumping.
- Tsilla Chelton, 93, French actress (Tatie Danielle).
- Manuel Eguiguren Galarraga, 82, Spanish-born Bolivian Roman Catholic prelate, Auxiliary Vicar Apostolic of El Beni (1981–2007).
- Grant Feasel, 52, American football player (Baltimore Colts, Seattle Seahawks).
- Sir David Fraser, 91, British Army general.
- Ovadia Harari, 68, Israeli engineer, Israel Prize recipient.
- Celeste Holm, 95, American actress (Gentleman's Agreement, All About Eve, Tom Sawyer), Oscar winner (1948). complications from a heart attack.
- Muzharul Islam, 88, Bangladeshi architect and urban planner, natural causes.
- Sadamu Komachi, 92, Japanese fighter pilot.
- Jacqueline Piatigorsky, 100, French-born American chess and tennis player, author and sculptor.
- Anne Spencer, 73, British naval officer and aide-de-camp to Queen Elizabeth II.
- Yoichi Takabayashi, 81, Japanese film director, pneumonia.

=== 16 ===
- William Asher, 90, American television writer and director (Alice, Bewitched, I Love Lucy), Emmy winner (1966), Alzheimer's disease.
- Linus Asong, 64–65, Cameroonian novelist.
- Bob Babbitt, 74, American bass guitarist (The Funk Brothers), brain cancer.
- Jean Baud, 92, French businessman.
- Paul Collins, 89, American football player.
- Stephen Covey, 79, American writer (The Seven Habits of Highly Effective People), complications after a bicycle accident.
- Gilbert Esau, 92, American politician.
- James F. Goodrich, 99, American businessman, Under Secretary of the Navy (1981–1987).
- Edward E. Hammer, 80, American electrical engineer.
- Antonín Holý, 75, Czech scientist, created most effective drugs for AIDS treatment, after long illness.
- Ben-Ami Kadish, 88, Israeli-American mechanical engineer and spy.
- Martin Kenzie, 56, British second unit director and cinematographer (Aliens, Willow, Game of Thrones).
- Taras Kiktyov, 25, Ukrainian football player, after long illness.
- Ed Lincoln, 80, Brazilian composer and musician, respiratory failure.
- Jon Lord, 71, English composer and musician (Deep Purple), pulmonary embolism.
- Masaharu Matsushita, 99, Japanese businessman, President of Panasonic (1961–1977), natural causes.
- Joseph Nduhirubusa, 74, Burundian Roman Catholic prelate, Bishop of Ruyigi (1980–2010).
- Wendy Law Suart, 85, Australian travel writer.
- Giora Tzahor, 70, Israeli intelligence agent, traffic collision.
- Henryk Wasilewski, 59, Polish middle-distance runner.
- Kitty Wells, 92, American country music singer ("It Wasn't God Who Made Honky Tonk Angels", "Making Believe"), complications after a stroke.
- Sir David Williams, 91, British admiral, Governor of Gibraltar (1982–1985).

=== 17 ===
- Ottorino Pietro Alberti, 84, Italian Roman Catholic prelate, Archbishop of Spoleto-Norcia (1973–1987) and Cagliari (1987–2003).
- Balavant Apte, 73, Indian politician, chronic lung disease.
- Rebecca Brooke, 60, American pornographic film actress and model, drowning.
- Thomas John Curran, 88, American senior judge of the District Court for the Eastern District of Wisconsin.
- Larry Dodge, 69, American businessman, aneurysm.
- Richard Evatt, 38, British boxer.
- Mrinal Gore, 84, Indian politician, cardiac arrest.
- Paul Langlois, 85, Canadian politician.
- Jorge Legorreta, 62, Mexican architect and urbanist, stroke.
- Forrest S. McCartney, 81, American USAF lieutenant general, director of the Kennedy Space Center (1986–1991).
- Jean-François Mertens, 66, Belgian mathematician.
- İlhan Mimaroğlu, 86, Turkish-born American composer and record producer, pneumonia.
- Ms. Melodie, 43, American rapper.
- Morgan Paull, 67, American actor (Blade Runner, Norma Rae, Patton), stomach cancer.
- William Raspberry, 76, American journalist and newspaper columnist (The Washington Post), prostate cancer.
- Marsha Singh, 57, British politician, MP for Bradford West (1997–2012).
- Wahengbam Nipamacha Singh, 82, Indian politician, Chief Minister of Manipur (1997–2001).
- Iet van Feggelen, 90, Dutch backstroke swimmer and world record holder.
- William L. Wainwright, 64, American politician, member of the North Carolina House of Representatives (since 1991), cancer.

=== 18 ===
- Yassin Affandi, 90, Bruneian politician.
- A. Lee Chandler, 89, American jurist, Chief Justice of South Carolina (1994).
- Robert Creamer, 90, American sportswriter and author, prostate cancer.
- Yosef Shalom Eliashiv, 102, Israeli rabbi, leader of Orthodox Judaism, heart failure.
- Jean François-Poncet, 83, French politician, Minister of Foreign Affairs (1978–1981), stroke.
- Aston Greathead, 91, New Zealand artist.
- Harvey Hess, 73, American poet and arts critic.
- Rajesh Khanna, 69, Indian actor and film producer, cancer.
- Robert Kurz, 68, German philosopher.
- Seppo Liitsola, 79, Finnish ice hockey player and coach.
- Günther Maleuda, 81, German politician, President of the People's Chamber (1989–1990).
- Pancho Martin, 86, Cuban racehorse trainer (Sham).
- Isidoro Martínez-Vela, 87, Spanish Olympic swimmer.
- Jack Matthews, 92, Welsh rugby union player and doctor.
- Dawoud Rajiha, 65, Syrian politician, Minister of Defense (since 2011), bomb blast.
- Assef Shawkat, 62, Syrian politician, deputy Minister of Defense, bomb blast.
- Ernest Toovey, 90, Australian cricketer and baseball player.
- Sir Geofroy Tory, 99, British diplomat, High Commissioner to Malaya (1957–1963) and Malta (1967–1970) and Ambassador to Ireland (1964–1967).
- Hasan Turkmani, 77, Syrian politician, Minister of Defense (2004–2009), Chief of Crisis Operations (since 2011), bomb blast.

=== 19 ===
- Humayun Ahmed, 63, Bangladeshi writer, colorectal cancer.
- Tom Davis, 59, American comedian and television writer (Saturday Night Live), four-time Emmy winner, throat and neck cancer.
- P. N. Dhar, 94, Indian economist.
- Brian Dobson, 80, English archaeologist.
- Klaus Eyferth, 83, German psychologist.
- George French, 85, English footballer.
- Mohammad Hassan Ganji, 100, Iranian meteorologist and academic, brain hemorrhage.
- Archer King, 95, American theatrical agent.
- Anthony Melio, 80, American politician, Member of the Pennsylvania House of Representatives (1987–2010), complications from an appendectomy.
- Hans Nowak, 75, German footballer (FC Bayern Munich).
- William Staub, 96, American engineer, developer of the commercial treadmill.
- Omar Suleiman, 76, Egyptian general and politician, Vice President (2011), heart attack.
- E. V. Thompson, 81, British author.
- Sylvia Woods, 86, American restaurateur, founder of Sylvia's Restaurant of Harlem, Alzheimer's disease.
- Valiulla Yakupov, 48, Russian Tatar Islamic cleric, shot.

=== 20 ===
- Karin Andersson, 93, Swedish politician, Minister for Gender Equality (1979–1982).
- Margaret Bhatty, 81, Indian schoolteacher, freelance journalist and writer.
- Sir Alastair Burnet, 84, British journalist and broadcaster, complications following strokes.
- Andrew Davidson, 2nd Viscount Davidson, 83, British peer and politician.
- Jack Davis, 81, American Olympic silver medal-winning (1952, 1956) hurdler, complications from a fall.
- Aharon Dolgopolsky, 81, Russian-born Israeli linguist.
- Tony Epper, 73, American actor and stuntman (Bram Stoker's Dracula, The Rock, Thelma and Louise), cancer.
- Tommy Farrell, 74–75, Irish footballer.
- José Hermano Saraiva, 92, Portuguese historian and jurist.
- Hisham Ikhtiyar, 70–71, Syrian military and security official, injuries from bomb blast.
- Ahmed Jdey, 61, Tunisian author, historian, and professor.
- Émile Kets, 88, Belgian Olympic basketball player.
- Max Leo, 70–71, German Olympic luger.
- Lit de Justice, 22, American Thoroughbred racehorse, infirmities of old age.
- John Monteith, 81, British academic.
- Hanne Marthe Narud, 54, Norwegian political scientist, cancer.
- Fioravante Perrotta, 80, American lawyer and political aide.
- Dorothy Germain Porter, 88, American golfer.
- Goldie Rogers, 61, Canadian professional wrestler, stroke.
- Simon Ward, 70, English actor (Loot, Young Winston, The Three Musketeers).

=== 21 ===
- Alexander Cockburn, 71, Scottish political journalist and writer, cancer.
- Michael Crozier, 75, New Zealand politician and physicist.
- Jessica Dublin, 94, American actress.
- Jean Ferniot, 93, French journalist and novelist.
- Annie France, 97, French actress.
- Geoffrey Hattersley-Smith, 89, British glaciologist.
- Ismail Hutson, 73, Malaysian actor, heart complications.
- Richard Jessup, 87, American Olympic sailor.
- Marie Kruckel, 88, American baseball player (AAGPBL).
- Andrzej Łapicki, 87, Latvian-born Polish actor.
- Susanne Lothar, 51, German actress (The White Ribbon).
- Mike Lynn, 76, American football executive (Minnesota Vikings).
- Ali Podrimja, 69, Albanian poet.
- James D. Ramage, 96, American naval aviator.
- Angharad Rees, 68, Welsh actress (Poldark), pancreatic cancer.
- Gene Stipe, 85, American politician, Oklahoma State Senator (1957–2003).
- Vida Stout, 82, New Zealand academic.
- Don Wilson, 74, English cricketer.

=== 22 ===
- Leonard Alexander, 90, Australian cricketer.
- Miguel Arteche, 86, Chilean poet and novelist.
- Eric Bell, 82, English footballer (Bolton Wanderers), complications from Alzheimer's disease.
- James F. Brandau, 79, American aviator.
- Charles Bray, 89–90, British painter and glass sculptor.
- Jim Carlen, 79, American college football player and coach.
- Giorgos Chatziioannidis, 52, Greek footballer.
- Ding Guangen, 82, Chinese politician, Minister of Railways (1985–1988).
- Miguel Gaspar, 84, Mexican baseball player.
- Tommy Higginson, 75, English footballer (Brentford).
- Kashinath Jalmi, 62, Indian politician.
- Ernie Machin, 68, English footballer (Coventry City, Plymouth Argyle).
- Nan Merriman, 92, American opera singer.
- George Armitage Miller, 92, American psychologist (The Magical Number Seven, Plus or Minus Two).
- Vincent O'Keefe, 92, American Jesuit cleric, President of Fordham University (1963–1965).
- Oswaldo Payá, 60, Cuban dissident, recipient of the 2002 Sakharov Prize, traffic collision.
- Fern Persons, 101, American actress (Field of Dreams, Hoosiers, Risky Business).
- Frank Pierson, 87, American film director and screenwriter (Dog Day Afternoon, Cool Hand Luke, A Star is Born), Oscar winner (1976).
- Håkon Randal, 82, Norwegian politician.
- Roberto Sebastian, 68, Filipino government official, heart attack.
- Ed Stevens, 87, American baseball player (Brooklyn Dodgers, Pittsburgh Pirates).
- Bohdan Stupka, 70, Ukrainian actor, People's Artist of USSR, bone cancer.
- Herbert Vogel, 89, American modern art collector and philanthropist, natural causes.
- Warren Winkelstein, 90, American epidemiologist.

=== 23 ===
- Lars Ardelius, 85, Swedish psychologist and novelist, heart failure.
- Eddie Barker, 84, American reporter, natural causes.
- Björn Folkow, 90, Swedish physiologist.
- Mirjana Gross, 90, Croatian historian.
- Graham Jackson, 45, British conductor and music director.
- Margaret Mahy, 76, New Zealand children's author, cancer.
- Maria Emanuel, Margrave of Meissen, 86, German noble.
- Louise Nippert, 100, American baseball team owner (Cincinnati Reds) and arts patron.
- Peaks and Valleys, 20, Canadian Thoroughbred racehorse, winner of the Molson Export Million Stakes (1995). (death announced on this date)
- Sally Ride, 61, American physicist and astronaut, first American woman in space, pancreatic cancer.
- Lakshmi Sahgal, 97, Indian politician, army officer and revolutionist of the Indian independence movement, cardiac arrest.
- John Treloar, 84, Australian Olympic (1952) sprinter, Commonwealth Games gold medalist.
- Esther Tusquets, 75, Spanish publisher, writer and essayist, pneumonia.
- José Luis Uribarri, 75, Spanish television presenter and director (Televisión Española), cerebral hemorrhage.
- Duane Wood, 74, American football player (Kansas City Chiefs).

=== 24 ===
- Jerry Ahern, 66, American writer.
- Hamlet Bareh, 81, Indian writer, historian and film director.
- Donald Baxter, 85, Canadian neurologist.
- Nevin Çokay, 82, Turkish painter and teacher.
- Kenneth Crook, 91, British diplomat, Ambassador to Afghanistan (1976–1979).
- Chad Everett, 75, American actor (Medical Center), lung cancer.
- Irvin Faust, 88, American author and educator, stroke.
- Thelma Glass, 96, American civil rights leader, academic and geographer, last surviving member of the Women's Political Council.
- Philip Hearnshaw, 59, Australian filmmaker
- Sherman Hemsley, 74, American actor (The Jeffersons, Amen, Dinosaurs), superior vena cava syndrome.
- Kuga, 5, Belgian Malinois military dog, complications from the wounds.
- Robert Ledley, 86, American scientist, inventor of the full-body CT scanner, Alzheimer's disease.
- Themo Lobos, 83, Chilean comic book writer and artist, respiratory failure.
- John Atta Mills, 68, Ghanaian politician, President (since 2009).
- Nancy Mudge, 82, American baseball player (AAGPBL).
- Mavelikkara Velukkutty Nair, 85, Indian musician.
- Michael H. Nash, 66, American historian, pulmonary embolism.
- Gregorio Peces-Barba, 74, Spanish politician and jurist, President of the Congress of Deputies (1982–1986) and co-author of Spanish Constitution, renal failure.
- Prime Defender, 8, British racehorse, winner of the Duke of York Stakes (2010), myocardial infarction.
- Hernán Raffo, 83, Chilean Olympic basketball player.
- Traleg Kyabgon Rinpoche, 57, Tibetan lama and teacher.
- Thanasis Tribonias, 28, Greek footballer, traffic collision.
- James West, 98, American psychiatrist and surgeon, co-founder of the Betty Ford Center.

=== 25 ===
- David Barby, 63, British antiques expert (Bargain Hunt), stroke.
- James Coward, 97, British military aviator.
- Eugene Forrester, 86, American general.
- Paul Frieden, 87, Luxembourgish Olympic athlete.
- Suzy Gershman, 64, American author, widow of Michael Gershman, brain cancer.
- B. R. Ishara, 77, Indian film director, tuberculosis.
- Barry Langford, 86, British television director and producer.
- Bruno Mazza, 88, Italian football player.
- Greg Mohns, 62, American CFL coach and executive (BC Lions, Toronto Argonauts), throat cancer.
- Marceau Stricanne, 92, French footballer.
- Franz West, 65, Austrian artist, liver disease.

=== 26 ===
- Hüseyin Aktaş, 71, Turkish Olympic marathon runner.
- Don Bagley, 84, American jazz bassist and composer.
- Miriam Ben-Porat, 94, Israeli Supreme Court judge, State Comptroller.
- Karl Benjamin, 86, American painter, heart failure.
- Clayton Droullard, 87, American football coach.
- M. Patton Echols, 86, American attorney and politician.
- Joyce Fitch, 90, Australian tennis player.
- John Gerassi, 81, French-American journalist.
- Walter Goss, 84, American sound engineer (Deliverance, The Deep, Mean Streets).
- Lupe Ontiveros, 69, American actress (Desperate Housewives, Selena, The Goonies), liver cancer.
- Pat Porter, 53, American Olympic (1984, 1988) distance runner, plane crash.
- Neil Reed, 36, American basketball player (Indiana) involved in Bob Knight controversy, heart attack.
- Ralph Slatyer, 83, Australian biologist, Chief Scientist (1989–1992).
- Mary Tamm, 62, English actress (Doctor Who), cancer.
- James D. Watkins, 85, American Naval officer and cabinet member, Chief of Naval Operations (1982–1986), Chair of the President's Commission on the HIV Epidemic (1987–1988), Secretary of Energy (1989–1993), heart failure.

=== 27 ===
- Norman Alden, 87, American actor (Back to the Future, Ed Wood, Tora! Tora! Tora!).
- Mati Angel, 73, Israeli paralympic athlete.
- R. G. Armstrong, 95, American actor (Predator, Dick Tracy, El Dorado) and playwright, natural causes.
- Stefano Bemer, 48, Italian shoemaker.
- Darryl Cotton, 62, Australian singer (Zoot, Cotton Keays & Morris) and television host (The Early Bird Show), liver cancer.
- Joe Crousen, 71, American football player and coach.
- Geraldine L. Daniels, 78, American politician.
- Brian Dorman, 75, Australian football player.
- Geoffrey Hughes, 68, English actor (Coronation Street, Yellow Submarine, Keeping Up Appearances), prostate cancer.
- Art Malone, 64, American football player (Atlanta Falcons, Philadelphia Eagles).
- Tony Martin, 98, American actor and singer, widower of Cyd Charisse, natural causes.
- Russ Mayberry, 86, Scottish-born American television director (Kojak, Magnum P.I., The Brady Bunch).
- Bruce Schultz, 80, Australian Anglican prelate, Bishop of Grafton (1985–1998).
- Hans Svedberg, 80, Swedish ice hockey player.
- Jack Taylor, 82, English football referee, officiated 1974 FIFA World Cup Final.
- Jan Trąbka, 81, Polish academic.
- Carl-Ludwig Wagner, 82, German politician, Minister-President of Rhineland-Palatinate (1988–1991).

=== 28 ===
- Vartan Achkarian, 76, Lebanese Armenian Catholic hierarch, Auxiliary Bishop of Beirut (1987–2011).
- María Colina Lozano, 90, Peruvian politician.
- Adam Cullen, 46, Australian painter.
- Phyllis Deane, 93, British economic historian.
- Amos Degani, 86, Israeli politician.
- Peter Evans-Freke, 11th Baron Carbery, 92, Anglo-Irish peer.
- Abu Fuard, 75, Sri Lankan cricket player and administrator.
- Suzanne Giese, 66, Danish writer and women's rights activist, after a short illness.
- Colin Horsley, 92, New Zealand-born British classical pianist.
- Carol Kendall, 94, American author (The Gammage Cup, The Whisper of Glocken).
- James Marriott, 39, British film critic and author.
- Sepp Mayerl, 75, Austrian mountaineer, climbing incident.
- William F. Milliken Jr., 101, American aerospace engineer, automotive engineer and racecar driver.
- Ruth Mott, 95, British television cook.
- Kazimiera Rykowska, 85, Polish Olympic athlete.
- Víctor Saucedo, 92–93, Mexican Olympic equestrian.
- David Thomas, 53, English cricketer, complications of multiple sclerosis.

=== 29 ===
- Norman Blake, 78, British academic and scholar.
- Chavis Carter, 21, American arrestant, suicide by gunshot.
- Tatiana Egorova, 42, Russian football manager and player.
- Osvaldo Fattoruso, 64, Uruguayan musician (Los Shakers, Opa), cancer.
- John Finnegan, 85, American actor (JFK, Last Action Hero, Mars Attacks!), complications from pneumonia.
- August Kowalczyk, 90, Polish actor, last survivor of 1942 Auschwitz concentration camp breakout.
- Chris Marker, 91, French writer, photographer, documentary film director (La jetée) and multimedia artist.
- Suzanne Martel, 87, Canadian writer.
- James Mellaart, 87, English archaeologist, excavator of Çatalhöyük.
- Sluggy Ranks, 45, Jamaican dancehall musician, injuries sustained in a car crash.
- Vempati Chinna Satyam, 82, Indian dancer and teacher, multiple organ failure.
- Heinz Staab, 86, German chemist.
- John Stampe, 55, Danish footballer, cancer.

=== 30 ===
- Donald J. Berthrong, 89, American historian, pneumonia.
- Maeve Binchy, 72, Irish novelist (Circle of Friends), columnist and public speaker, heart attack.
- George F. Cahill Jr., 85, American scientist.
- Bill Doss, 43, American rock singer and guitarist (The Olivia Tremor Control, The Apples in Stereo), aneurysm.
- Elbert Allen Drummond, 68, American heir, businessman and philanthropist.
- Stig Ossian Ericson, 88, Swedish actor and script writer.
- Christopher Evans, 102, English chaplain and theologian.
- Les Green, 70, English footballer (Derby County) and manager (Tamworth), cancer.
- Jonathan Hardy, 71, New Zealand actor (Farscape, Mad Max, Moulin Rouge!) and screenwriter.
- József Hunics, 76, Hungarian Olympic sprint canoer.
- Bill Kitchen, 51, Canadian ice hockey player (Montreal Canadiens), heart attack.
- Mary Louise Rasmuson, 101, American philanthropist.
- Héctor Tizón, 82, Argentinian writer and diplomat.

=== 31 ===
- César Amaro, 64, Uruguayan classical guitarist.
- David W. Ames, 90, American ethnomusicologist and anthropologist.
- Kevin Best, 80, Australian artist.
- Marie Brenden, 74, Norwegian politician.
- Roy Bryce-Laporte, 78, American sociologist.
- John P. Corderman, 70, American politician and judge.
- Lucien Daloz, 81, French Roman Catholic prelate, Archbishop of Besançon (1980–2003).
- Tatiana de la tierra, 51, Colombian writer.
- Ben Donnell, 76, American football player.
- Bobby Edwards, 86, American singer.
- Raúl Fajardo Moreno, 82, Colombian architect.
- Mollie Hunter, 90, Scottish writer.
- Iryna Kalynets, 72, Ukrainian writer and Soviet dissident, wife of Ihor Kalynets, after long illness.
- Sydney Knowles, 90, British Royal Navy frogman (diver).
- Rudolf Kreitlein, 92, German football referee (1966 FIFA World Cup).
- Eleanor Krohn Herrmann, 77, American nursing educator and historian.
- Curt Levine, 64, American politician and attorney.
- Tess Mallos, 79, Australian cookbook author.
- Abdi Jeylani Malaq Marshale, app. 43, Somali journalist and comedian, shot.
- Mutsuko Miki, 95, Japanese activist, widow of former Prime Minister Takeo Miki, colon cancer.
- Ítalo Piaggi, 77, Argentine army officer (Battle of Goose Green).
- Lucio Quarantotto, 55, Italian songwriter and composer ("Con te partirò"), suicide by defenestration.
- Alfredo Ramos, 87, Brazilian footballer and coach.
- Ardalion Rastov, 86, Russian engineer and military designer.
- Stefan Siczek, 74, Polish Roman Catholic prelate, Auxiliary Bishop of Radom (since 1992).
- Tony Sly, 41, American punk rock singer and guitarist (No Use for a Name).
- Gore Vidal, 86, American writer (The City and the Pillar, Myra Breckinridge), political commentator and actor (Gattaca), pneumonia.
