= Lienert =

Lienert is a surname. Notable people with the surname include:

- Anton Lienert-Brown (born 1995), New Zealand rugby union player
- Brian Lienert (born 1943), Australian rules footballer
- Daniel Lienert-Brown (born 1993), New Zealand rugby union player
- Jarrod Lienert (born 1994), Australian rules footballer
- Konrad Lienert (1933–2014), Austrian pair skater
- Meinrad Lienert (1865 –1933), Swiss poet
- Ron Lienert (born 1945), Australian rules footballer
- Walter Lienert (1925–2012), American gymnastics coach and judge

See also

- Lienert Cosemans (born 1993), Belgian volleyball player
