= Marceau (disambiguation) =

François Séverin Marceau (1769–1796) was a French general of the Revolutionary Wars.

Marceau may also refer to:

== People ==
=== Surname ===
- Christie Marceau (1993–2013), New Zealand murder victim
- Félicien Marceau (1913–2012), Belgian-French writer
- Gilles Marceau (1928–2008), Canadian lawyer and politician
- Jean-François Marceau (born 1976), Canadian judoka
- Joseph Marceau (1879–1955), Canadian politician
- Marcel Marceau (1923–2007), French mime
- Nicolas Marceau (born 1964), Canadian economist, university professor, politician and former provincial Minister of Finance
- Olivier Marceau (born 1973), French triathlete
- Richard Marceau (born 1970), Canadian politician
- Sophie Marceau (born 1966), French actress
- Theodore C. Marceau (1859–1922), American photographer

=== Given name ===
- Marceau Fourcade (fl. 1905–1936), French rower
- Marceau Pivert (1895–1958), French schoolteacher, trade unionist, Socialist militant and journalist
- Marceau Somerlinck (1922–2005), French football player
- Marceau Stricanne (1920–2012), French footballer

== Fictional characters ==
- Aliki and Margot Marceau, two DC Comics characters
- William (Bill) Marceau, a character in the crime/mystery serial The Edge of Night (1957–1979)

== Ships ==
- Marceau-class ironclad, a type of ironclad battleships of the French Navy
  - French ironclad Marceau
- French destroyer Marceau (D601), launched in 1941 as the German destroyer Z31, acquired by France in 1946 and renamed

== Other uses ==
- Avenue Marceau, a street in Paris named after François Séverin Marceau
