= Perrotta =

Perrotta is an Italian surname. Notable people with the surname include:

- Cosimo Perrotta (born 1942), Italian academic
- Fioravante Perrotta (1931–2012), American jurist
- Louis A. Perrotta (1900-1985), Italian-American surgeon
- Lucilla Perrotta (born 1975), Italian beach volleyball player
- Marco Perrotta (born 1994), Italian footballer
- Maria Perrotta (born 1974), Italian classical pianist
- Rafael Perrotta (1920-1977), Argentine journalist
- Simone Perrotta (born 1977), Italian footballer
- Tiziano Perrotta (born 2006), Argentine footballer
- Tom Perrotta (born 1961), American writer and screenwriter
