= Zepos =

Zepos is a surname. Notable people with the surname include:

- Daphne Zepos (1959–2012), Greek chef, writer, educator, and cheesemaker
- Ioannis Zepos (1870/1871–1946), Greek legal historian
- Panagiotis Zepos (1908–1985), Greek lawyer and government official
