= Goldschneider =

Goldschneider is a surname, meaning "gold cutter" in the German language. Notable people named Goldschneider include:

- Gary Goldschneider (1939–2019), American writer, pianist, composer, and personologist
- Jackie Goldschneider, American television personality on The Real Housewives of New Jersey
