= Cardoni (surname) =

Cardoni is an Italian surname. Notable people with the surname include:

- Ben Cardoni (1920–1969), American baseball player
- Ennio Cardoni (1929–2012), Italian footballer
- Jeff Cardoni (born 1972), American composer
- Manuel Cardoni (born 1972), Luxembourgish footballer
