= Mary-Anne O'Connor =

Australian novelist specializing in historical fiction, war sagas and romance

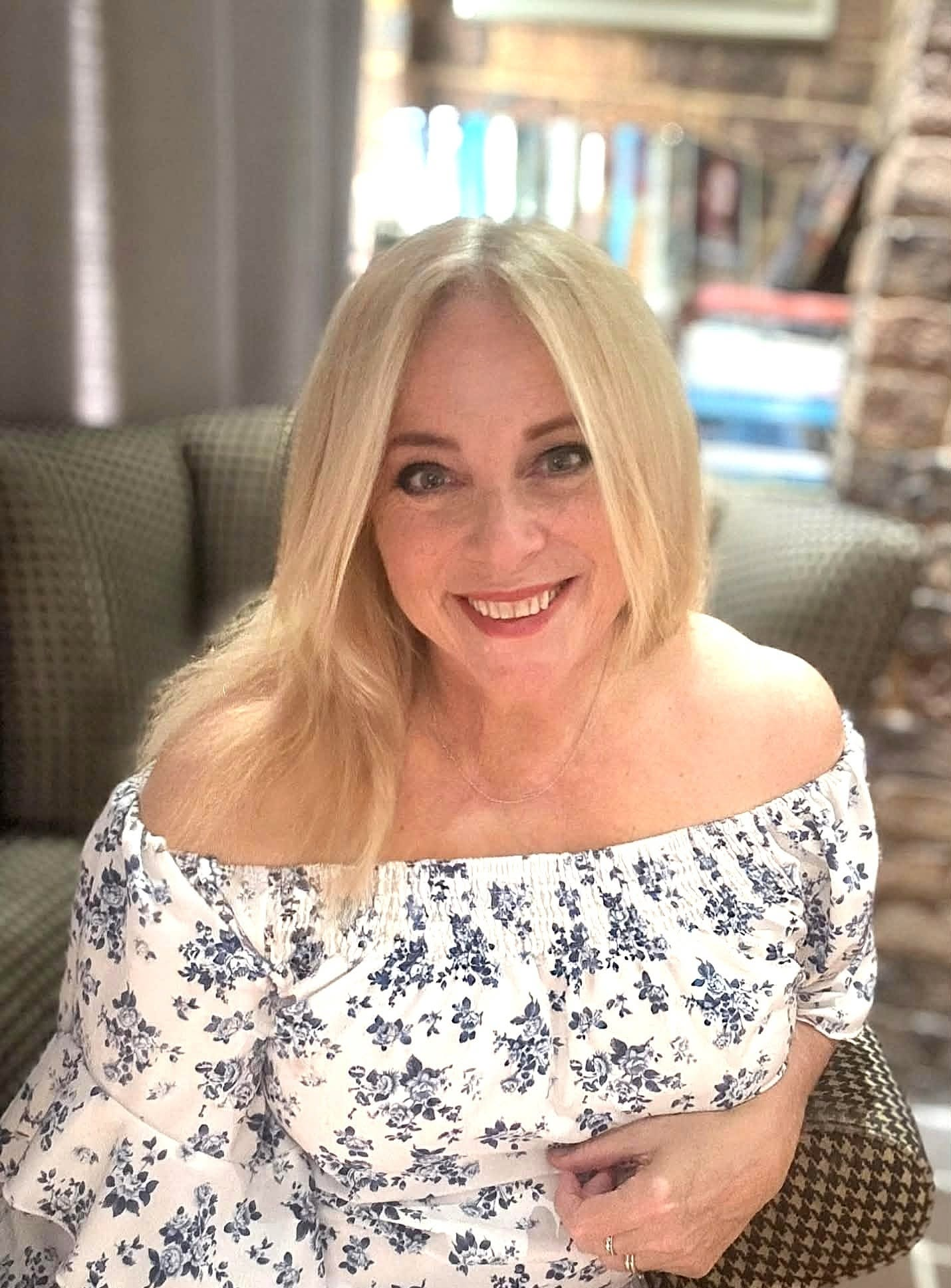
- Writing career
- Language: English
- Notable work: Gallipoli Street

Mary-Anne O'Connor is an Australian novelist and screenwriter.

== Biography ==
Mary-Anne O'Connor grew up in Wahroonga, Sydney, the daughter of Dorn and Australian artist Kevin Best.. She attended Mt St Benedicts Catholic Girls High School then St Leos College Wahroonga. Mary-Anne then pursued a successful marketing and lecturing career before marrying Anthony O'Connor in 1997. She gained her degree at Macquarie University from 2001 - 2005, graduating with a combined BA Dip Ed with specialties in environment, music and literature. She also had two children during this time, James 'Jimmy' O'Connor (2003) and Jack O'Connor (2005).

As the youngest of six children herself, she was inspired by her father's foray into the art scene in mid-life. This example would see her follow a creative path at the same age, publishing twelve books in ten years (2015 - 2025).

In 2015, she published her first novel Gallipoli Street through HQ, later acquired by HarperCollins Australia. O'Connor has published seven subsequent novels through HarperCollins: Worth Fighting For (2016), War Flower (2017), In A Great Southern Land (2019), Where Fortune Lies (2020), Sisters of Freedom (2021), Dressed By Iris (2022), and Never to Surrender (2023). O'Connor's next novels were contracted with Penguin Random House. At the Going Down of the Sun (2024), Mary Christmas, (2024), The Stowaway (2025) and Christmas Joy (2025). All are critically acclaimed.

Mary-Anne O'Connor is currently writing TV and movie scripts along with her first contemporary rom-com, A Perfect Mess, a project she is also developing for the screen. Her TV pilot Deer In The Headlights was a finalist at Bitchfest Film and Screenplay Festival and Outstanding Screenplays, 2026.

== Bibliography ==
=== Novels ===
- Gallipoli Street (2015)
- Worth Fighting For (2016)
- War Flower (2017)
- In A Great Southern Land (2019)
- Where Fortune Lies (2020)
- Sisters of Freedom (2021)
- Dressed By Iris (2022)
- Never to Surrender (2023)
- At the Going Down of the Sun (2024)
- Mary Christmas (2024)
- The Stowaway (2025)
- Christmas Joy (2025)
