= Marci és a kapitány =

- Written by: Ottó Demény
- Directed by: Márta Beregszászi
- Voices of: Lajos Varanyi; Irén Szöllősy; Ildikó Simándi; Gertrúd Havas; István Bölöni Kiss; Hugó Gruber
- Theme music composer: Ferenc Váry
- Country of origin: Hungary
- Original language: Hungarian
- No. of seasons: 1
- No. of episodes: 13

Production
- Cinematography: Anna Czóbel
- Editor: Gabriella Karátsony
- Running time: 14 minutes per episode
- Production company: Magyar Televízió

Original release
- Release: 1977

Marci és a kapitány (lit. Marci and the Captain) is a Hungarian series of animated puppet films produced in 1977-1978.

== Narrators ==
- Marci: Gertrúd Havas
- Captain: Lajos Varanyi
- Mrs Orsolya: Irén Szöllősy
- Anikó: Ildikó Simándi
- Béka: István Bölöni Kiss
- Bernát: Hugó Gruber

== List of episodes ==
1. Ki a jó gyermek?
2. Ki esik a vízbe?
3. Az emberrablók
4. Hinta-palinta
5. Érdemes hegyet mászni
6. Orsolya néni születésnapja
7. Selyemhajú Stefánia
8. Hol a szemüveg?
9. Hét tenger ördöge
10. A kedvező szél
11. Hajótörés
12. Palackposta
