= Anna Czóbel =

Hungarian cinematographer

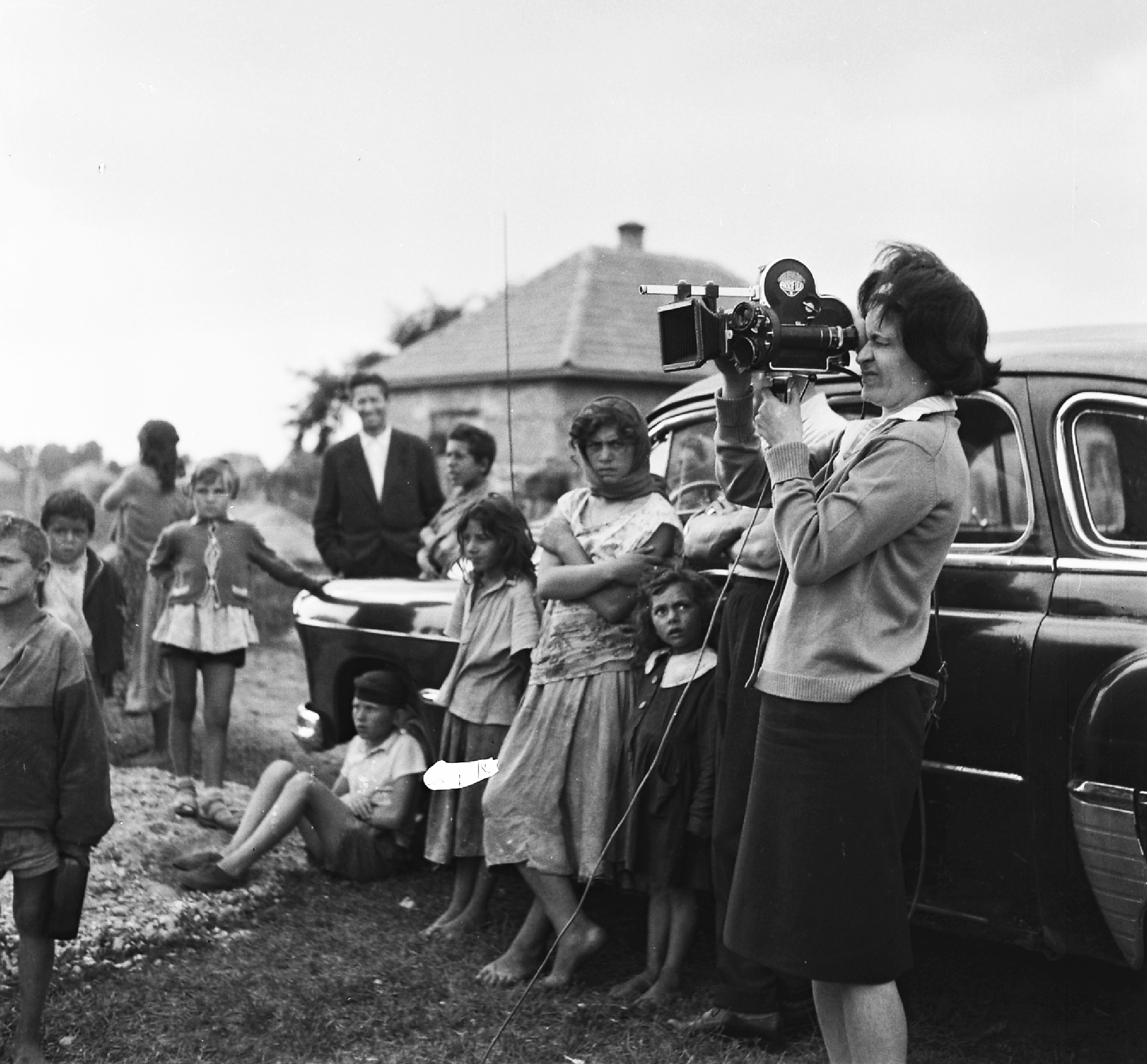
- Czóbel in 1961 with her camera
- Born: 17 November 1918; Budapest, Hungary
- Died: 9 December 2012 (aged 94); Budapest, Hungary
- Occupation: Cinematographer

Anna Czóbel (17 November 1918 – 9 December 2012) was a Hungarian cinematographer who worked for Magyar Televízió. She was a recipient of the Meritorious Artist Award in 1975. She is an Honorary Member of the Hungarian Society of Cinematographers.

== Life and career ==
Anna Czóbel was born on 17 November 1918, the only daughter of Ernő Czóbel, a literary historian, and Sarolta Lányi, a poet and educator. Her uncle was Béla Czóbel, a well-known Hungarian painter. She was four years old when her parents emigrated to Moscow. She graduated from the State Institute of Cinematography in the Soviet Union and started working as an assistant cinematographer at Soyuzdetfilm. She returned to Hungary in 1945 and worked at Mafirt Krónika (a newsreel) and then at Mafilm. In 1950, she became a lecturer at the University of Theatre and Film Arts in Budapest, teaching cinematography to Vilmos Zsigmond, Sándor Sára and István Gaál, among others. She was a member of the Hungarian filming crew for the 1952 Summer Olympics. From 1958 to 1990 she worked for Magyar Televízió as a cinematographer and then senior cinematographer; she tried herself in various television genres. She retired in 1981, but kept working at the TV station for another nine years.

== Selected works ==
- Beszélnek a színek (1953)
- Színek hatalma (1958)
- Ha én egyszer kinyitom a számat (1964)
- A művészet legyen mindenkié (1965)
- A parányok óriásai
- Cicavízió (1961)
- Jogi esetek
- Kuckó (1968)
- Óvodások műsora
- Zsebtévé (1965)
- Vers mindenkinek
- Marci és a kapitány (1978)
