= Malalai Kakar =

Afghan police officer (1967–2008)

- ملالۍ کاکړ
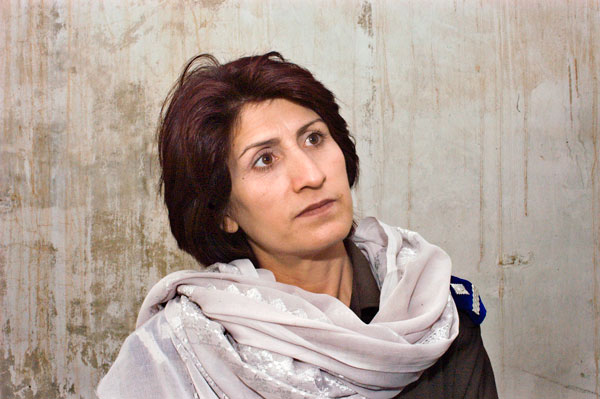
- Malalai Kakar (2004)
- Born: 1967; Afghanistan
- Died: September 28, 2008 (aged 40–41); Kandahar, Afghanistan
- Cause of death: Gunshot wounds
- Occupations: Policewoman; Investigator for the Kandahar Police Department

Malalai Kakar (Pashto: ملالۍ کاکړ; 1967 – 28 September 2008) was the most high-profile policewoman in the Islamic Republic of Afghanistan (2001–2021) during its existence.

As lieutenant colonel, she was the head of Kandahar's department of crimes against women. Kakar, who received numerous death threats, was assassinated by the Taliban on September 28, 2008.

Kakar joined the police force in 1982, following in the footsteps of her father and brothers. She was the first woman to graduate from the Kandahar Police Academy, and the first to become an investigator with the Kandahar Police Department.

== Gender issues in Afghan law enforcement ==
By the end of 2009 there were about 500 active duty policewomen in Afghanistan, compared with about 92,500 policemen. A few dozen served in the southern provinces of Kandahar and Helmand, where the influence of the Taliban was strongest.

Policewomen played an essential role in the aftermath of the American and allied invasion and overthrow of the Islamic Emirate of Afghanistan. In a culture that is marked by a strict separation of the sexes, the security forces needed women to perform special tasks, like the searching of women and homes. They were essential to conducting home searches, since Afghans are deeply offended when male soldiers or police enter premises where women are present, and at checkpoints men cannot search women for concealed weapons and other contraband.

In December 2009, Colonel Shafiqa Quraisha, the head of the Gender Issues Unit of the Afghan police, described a raid in which insurgents had collected women into a room where weapons were hidden. Kakar was able to search both the women and the room, finding the weapons. Raiding a house, when a female officer is the first one to enter, male residents cannot complain that police had violated decorum by entering a residence with women inside.

Hanifa Safi and Najia Sediqi, heads of women affairs in Laghman Province, were assassinated in 2012. On Thursday 4 July 2013, Islam Bibi, a 37-year-old mother of three and the leading female police officer in Helmand Province, was killed on her way to work. A few months later, on 15 September, Bibi's 38-year-old successor, Negar, was also shot; she died the following day.

== Death ==
Malalai Kakar was shot dead between 7:00am and 8:00am in her car outside of her house while on the way to work on 28 September 2008. At the time, Kakar was said to be either in her late 30s or early to mid-40s. She had six children.

== See also ==
- List of unsolved murders (2000–present)
