= Hanifa Safi =

Afghan politician

Personal details
- Died: 13 July 2012
- Occupation: Fmr. Head of Afghanistan's Women's Affairs Ministry in Laghman Province, Afghanistan

Hanifa Safi (died 13 July 2012) was the regional head of the Women's Affairs Ministry for Laghman Province, Afghanistan, from 2008 until her assassination in mid-2012. She worked on cases concerning violence against women, supporting the women to overcome the violence. On July 13, Hanifa Safi was killed by a bomb attached to her car, also wounding her husband and their daughter, while driving through Laghman's capital Mehtar Lam. Mehtar Lam lies roughly 150 km (93 miles) north-east of Kabul. The assassination was widely condemned including by the United Nations. In 2006, in a similar case, the regional head for Women's Affairs in Kandahar Province, Safia Amajan, was shot and killed by the Taliban.

== See also ==
- Malalai Kakar
