= César Amaro =

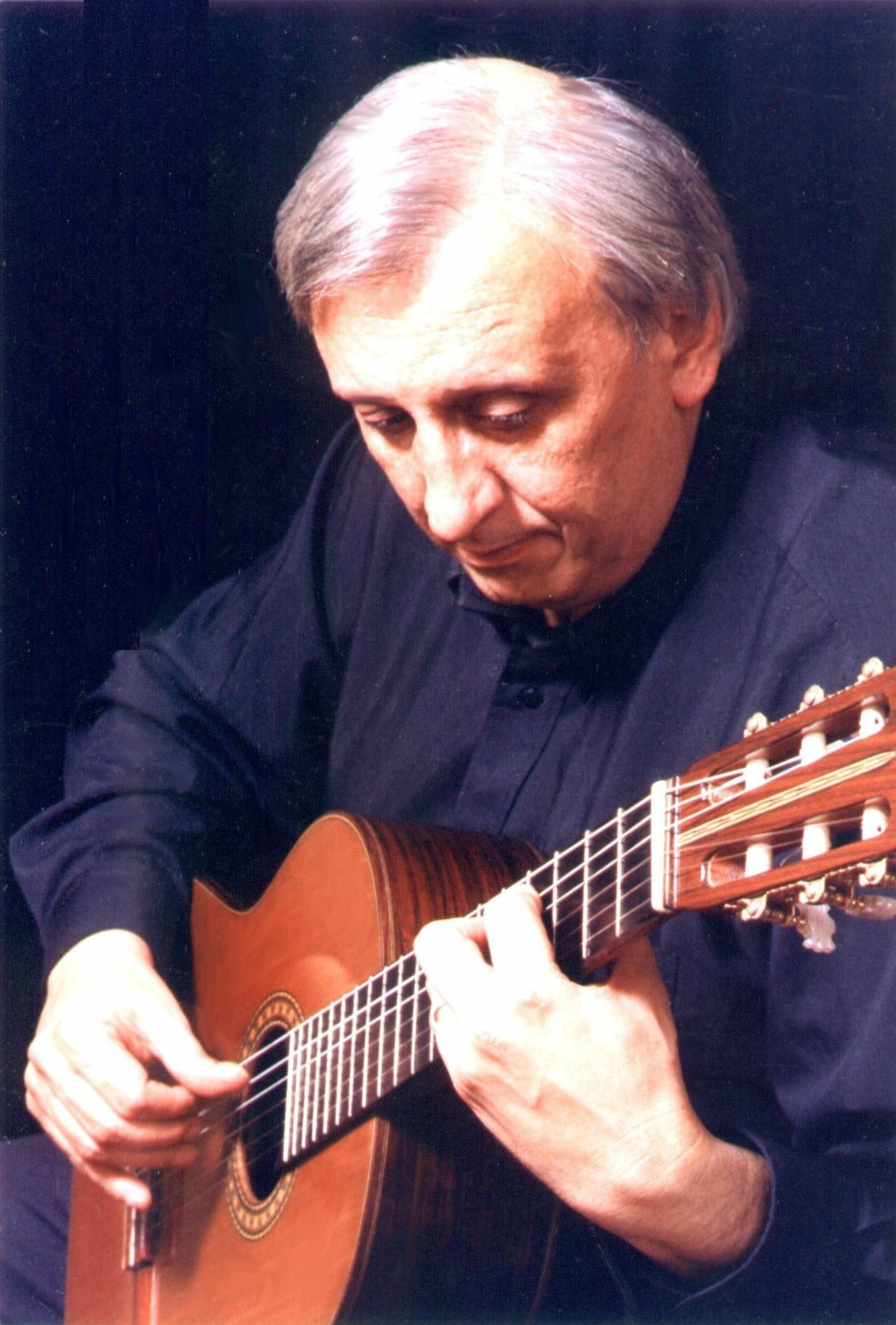

Background information
- Born: 25 October 1948; Montevideo, Uruguay
- Died: 31 July 2012 Montevideo, Uruguay
- Instrument: Guitar

César Nicanor Amaro Carlevaro (25 October 1948 – 31 July 2012) was a Uruguayan classical guitarist. He was well known to many guitar players and listeners.

== Early life ==
Amaro was born in Montevideo, Uruguay, and began his guitar studies at age eleven years with his uncle, Abel Carlevaro, with whom he continued working until he perfected his guitar technique. At the same time he learned harmony and composition at the National Conservatory of the University in Montevideo.

== Career and achievements ==
Cesar was an active teacher of the guitar. He was also the headmaster of the Guitar Superior Studies at the Conservatories of the towns of San José y Rocha, Uruguay. He was taught by Abel Carlevaro in some master classes for Uruguayan teachers in 1976, 1977, 1978, and 1987. His intense artistic activity includes presentations as solo player, guitar duo and with orchestras in several cities in Uruguay, Buenos Aires (Colon's Theater, San Martin's Theater), and in Europe (Poland, Romania, Italy, Bulgaria, France, Switzerland and Spain). He has attended international festivals, as solo player and with orchestras also ("Festivale Internazionale delle Nazione" in Rome (Italy), "Festival de Cinémas et Cultures de L'América Latine" in Biarritz in France, "Festival Argentina '97", 1° y 2° Festival International "Ciudad de Montevideo" in Montevideo, Uruguay.

He has attended as jury member in several international guitar competitions. As an active arranger and composer, he has created several works for guitar solo, two guitars and chamber orchestra. He has recordings and didactic material of his own among his edited material. Several composers have dedicated compositions to him, such as Mario Sagradini (Concierto Criollo for guitar and orchestra), Diego Legrand (Tarde Gris, tango), Abel Carlevaro (the last book of Microestudios), Dimitri Dumitrescu (Variaciones sobre un teme de Bártok), Elizabeth González (Alternativa). He has also recorded for Orfeo and Tacuabé (Uruguay), Edimur (Argentina), and Gemecs (Spain).

Amaro has particularly specialized in the interpretation of works of the Paraguayan composer Agustín Barrios, giving presentation, concerts and master classes about his life and music in America and Europe. In 1987, he received a recognition from the Centro Guitarrístico del Uruguay (Guitar Center of Uruguay). He has been the president of the Guitar Center of Uruguay since 1992. César Amaro also hosted the weekly TV program "La Guitarra y sus Intérpretes" (The Guitar and its Performers). Cesar Amaro was a good friend of the Argentine guitar master Oscar Emilio Tirao, better known by everyone as "Cacho" or "Cacho Tirao". Cacho Tirao played several songs and arrangements in Amaro's weekly TV program.

Amaro died on 31 July 2012. His remains are buried at Buceo Cemetery.
