= Clayton Droullard =

American football coach (1924–2012)

Biographical details
- Born: October 11, 1924; Cuba City, Wisconsin, U.S.
- Died: July 26, 2012 (aged 87); Whitewater, Wisconsin, U.S.

Coaching career (HC unless noted)
- 1951–1954: Morningside

Head coaching record
- Overall: 16–16–1

Accomplishments and honors

Championships
- 1 NCC (1954)

Clayton Arthur Droullard (October 11, 1924 – July 26, 2012) was an American football coach. He was the head football coach at Morningside College in Sioux City, Iowa. He held that position for four seasons, from 1951 until 1954. His coaching record at Morningside was 16–16–1. Droullard graduated from the University of Dubuque, where he lettered in football and basketball.

== Head coaching record ==
Year	Team	Overall	Conference	Standing	Bowl/playoffs
Morningside Maroons (North Central Conference) (1951–1954)
1951	Morningside	3–5–1	2–4	5th	
1952	Morningside	5–3	3–3	5th	
1953	Morningside	3–5	2–3	T–4th	
1954	Morningside	5–3	5–1	T–1st	
Morningside:		16–16–1	2–7–1		
Total:		16–16–1			
National championship Conference title Conference division title or championship game berth
