= Gary Goldschneider =

American musician (1939–2019)

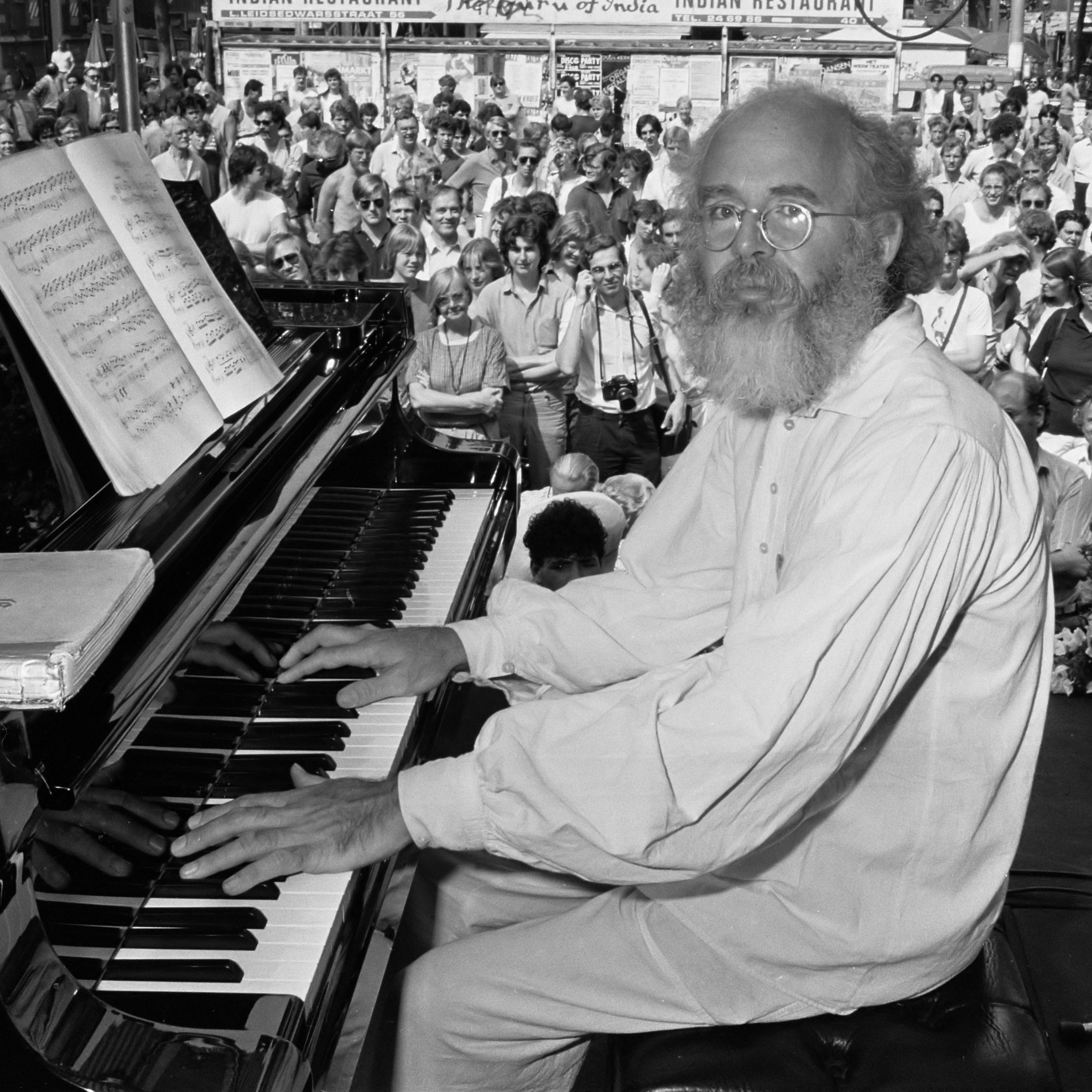
- Goldschneider in 1984
- Born: May 22, 1939; Philadelphia, Pennsylvania, US
- Died: October 5, 2019 (age 80)
- Citizenship: United States, Netherlands
- Education: Yale University; University of Pennsylvania
- Spouses: Antoinette Filanowska, Berthe Meijer
- Scientific career
- Fields: Personologist; Music (pianist)

Gary Goldschneider (22 May 1939 – 5 October 2019) was a writer, pianist, composer, and personologist. He is known for writing the Secret Language personological book series, based on astrology, numerology, and tarot, in which he studied and assessed character traits of over 14,000 people to generalize birth characteristics for each day of the year. In addition, Goldschneider has performed several "marathon" piano pieces, such as playing all 32 of Beethoven's sonatas in one sitting. Goldschneider's most successful Beethoven Marathon took place in Amsterdam on August 19, 1984. Attended by an estimated 10.000 people it made front-page headlines all over the country.

On other occasions in Nevada City, California, in 1984, and in Amsterdam in 1985, he performed all of Mozart's sonatas in one sitting. This took approximately six hours. Goldschneider also was a prolific composer.

== Collaborations ==
Goldschneider has collaborated with W.P Julian Clef, another "marathon" pianist, during Clef's piano music tour in January 2003. Clef has also studied under Goldschneider.

== Books ==
Goldschneider's published books are:

- Astrologie Anders, 1989, Gary Goldschneider, Bzztoh publishers, The Hague. Published in Dutch.
- Wunderkind, 1991, Gary Goldschneider, Bzztoh publishers, The Hague. This is the first volume of four published in Dutch.
- The Secret Language of Birthdays, 1994, with Joost Elffers and Aron Goldschneider, Penguin Studio Books. ISBN 978-0-670-03261-7
- The Secret Language of Relationships, 1997, with Joost Elffers, Penguin Studio Books. ISBN 978-0-670-03262-4
- The Secret Language of Destiny, 1999, with Joost Elffers, Penguin Studio Books. ISBN 0-670-03263-8
- Charting the Times of Your Life, 2002, Gary Goldschneider, Atria Books. ISBN 0-7434-6049-9 (Charting the Times of Your Life was initially released as a hardcover book entitled The Astrology of Time.)
- The Secret Language of Luck, 2004, Gary Goldschneider, Riverhead. ISBN 1-59448-023-0
- Personology 2005, Gary Goldschneider, Running Press. ISBN 978-0-7624-2229-6
- Gary Goldschneider’s Everyday Astrology (How to Make Astrology Work for You), 2009, Gary Goldschneider, Quirk Books. ISBN 978-1-59474-408-2
- The Astrology Of Time, 2002, Gary Goldschneider Atria. ISBN 0743456939

== Death ==
On October 11, 2019, Thomas Rezek, the co-author of Goldschneider's Secret Language books, tweeted that Goldschneider had died six days earlier, on October 5.
