= Carol Kendall (writer) =

American writer

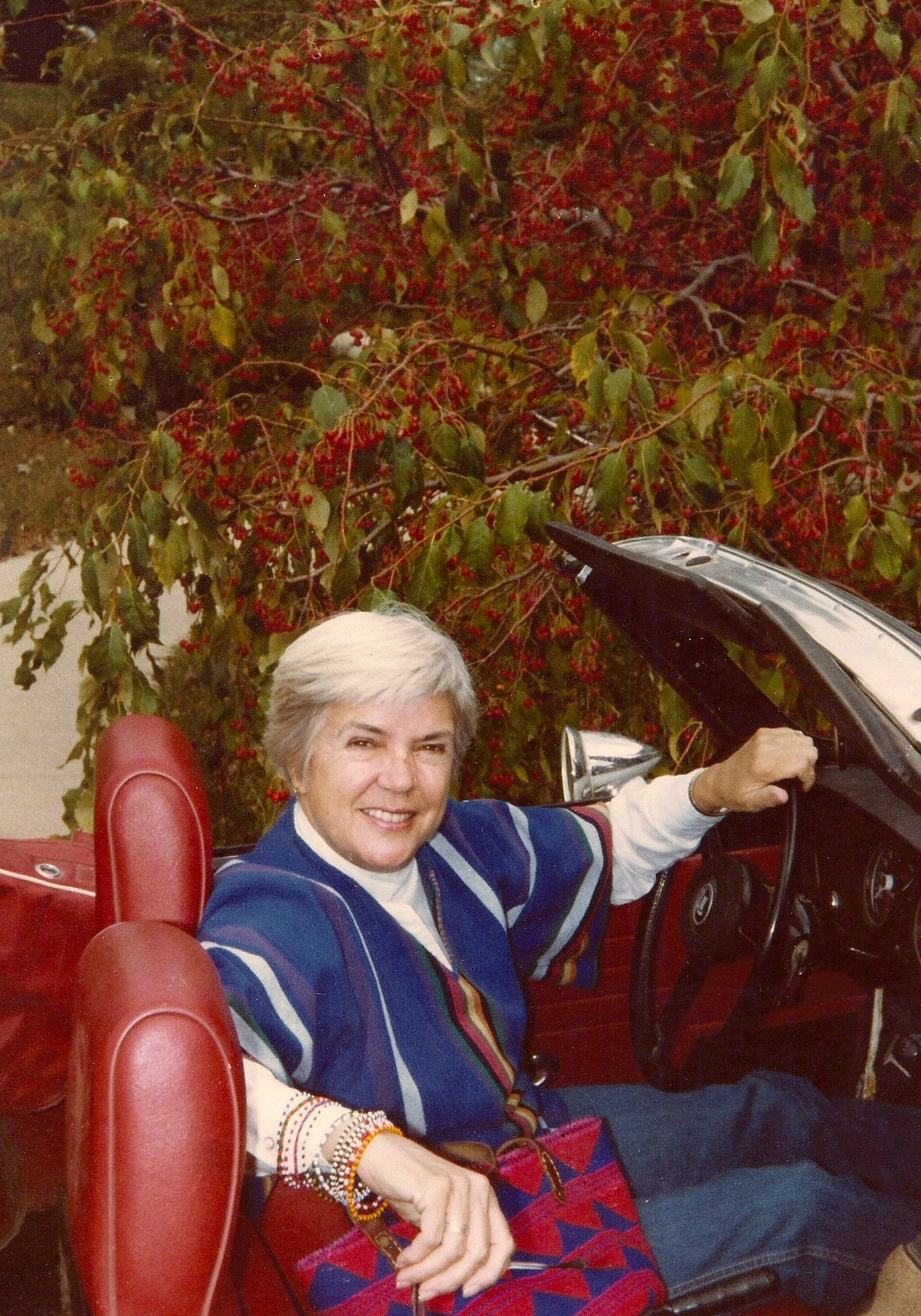

Carol Seeger "Siggy" Kendall (September 13, 1917 – July 28, 2012) was an American writer of children's books. She has received the Newbery Honor, Ohioana award, Parents choice award, and the Mythopoeic Society Aslan award.

== Biography ==
Carol Kendall was born in Bucyrus, Ohio, and was a graduate of Ohio University. Some of her first books were directed at adults such as "The Black Seven" (1946) and "The Baby Snatcher" (1952). It was her travels across the world that inspired her folk tale stories. She even gathered old folk tales from other countries and translated them into English for children. Despite her love for traveling, she always loved returning to her home on Holiday Drive and to Kansas.

== Marriage and family ==
Carol Kendall married Paul Murray Kendall. He was an English professor, historian, and a biographer. He died in November 1973. She died almost 40 years later, on July 28, 2012, in Lawrence, Kansas. She was survived by two daughters and three grandchildren.

== Writing career ==
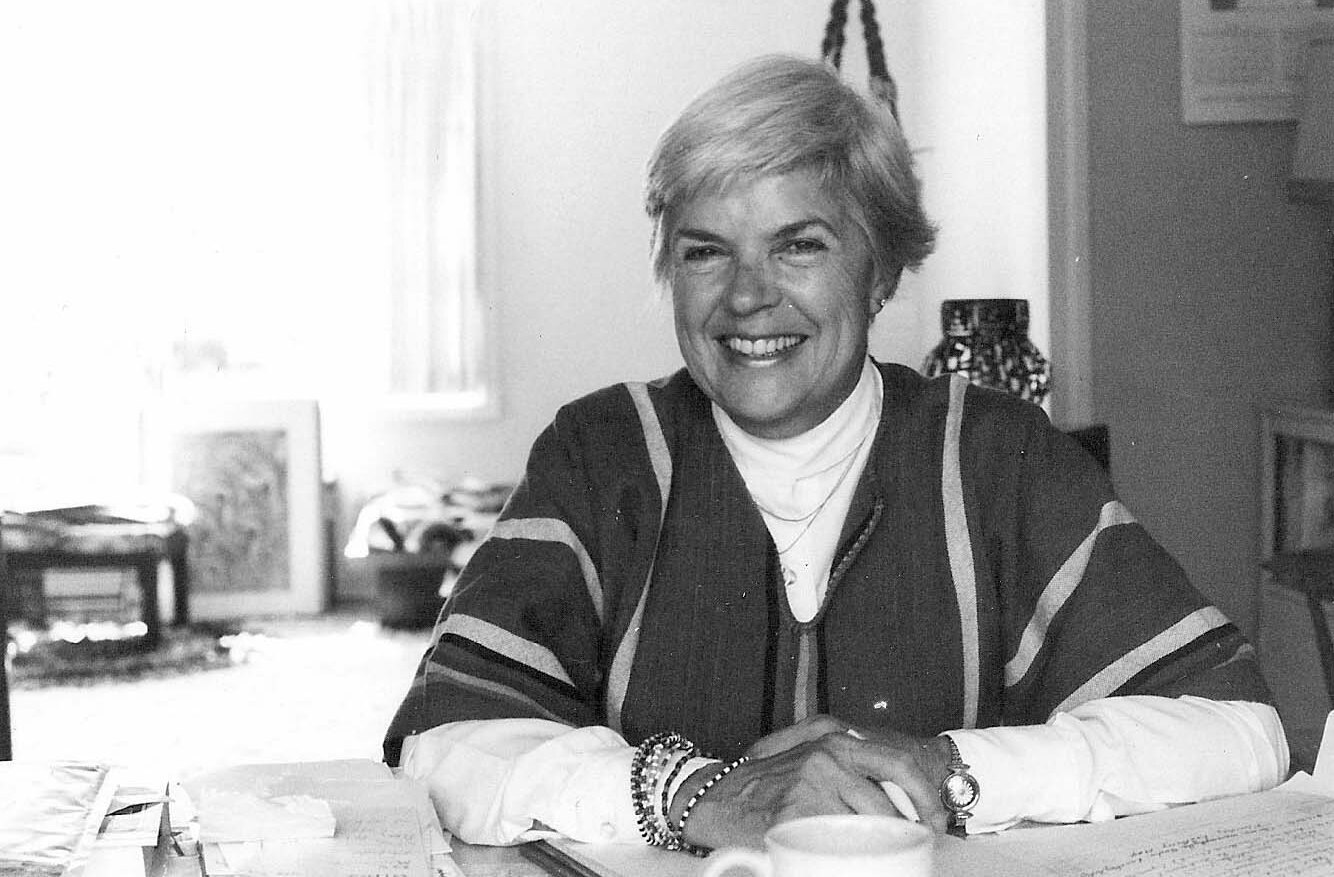

Commenting on her career Kendall once said:

People ask me "What made you decide to be a writer?" and laugh knowingly when I answer "Six older brothers."

Those six brothers were as fine a set of boys and young men as one could want, but they did talk a lot. By the time I made my belated appearance into the family, they were so well gifted in the flow of conversation that there were few pauses for the addition of one small female voice. So I grew up listening. Family recollections would indicate that I was just one sentence short of being completely mute—my single comment of record (at age four) was "Thank goodness that noisy thing is gone." The noisy thing was my brother Arden, whose goings and comings were as turbulent as a high wind gusting through the house.

But then came school! I loved school. The teachers also talked a lot, but they did it to me instead of to each other, and their words were about reading and writing—worth all the missed conversations in the world. My voice could be heard at last! Before the year was out, I started to write a "diary-book" with my new power. The opening line was "I saw my first robin today." It was also the last line, for clearly I had run out of words I knew how to write. The rest of my thoughts would have to wait a spell.

I am still not adept at entering conversations when there are more than three competing talkers, but I don't mind much because I know I can put my own offerings into the computer and fish them out when the time is ripe.

Kendall is most well known for her children's fantasy. Her book The Gammage Cup was a Newbery Honor book and won the Ohioana award. She also won the Parents choice award and the Mythopoeic Society Aslan award for The Firelings.

Her books include:

- "The Adventures of Curley Green" (1946)
- The Black Seven (1946)
- The Baby-Snatcher (1952)
- The Other Side of the Tunnel (1957)
- The Gammage Cup (1959)
- The Big Splash (1960)
- The Whisper of Glocken (1965)
- Sweet and Sour: Tales from China (1978)
- The Firelings (1981)
- Haunting Tales from Japan (1985)
- The Wedding of the Rat Family (1988)
