= Ahmad Khan Samangani =

Afghan politician (1957–2012)

- Born: 1957
- Died: July 14, 2012 (aged 54–55); Aybak, Samangan Province, Afghanistan
- Military career
- Rank: Commander
- Unit: Junbish faction of Northern Alliance
- Conflicts: Soviet–Afghan War; War in Afghanistan (1996–2001); War in Afghanistan (2001–present)

Ahmad Khan Samangani (1957 – 14 July 2012) was an Afghan member of parliament and a commander of the Junbish-i Milli. He was the target of and killed in a suicide attack on 14 July 2012. Samangani was a known anti-Taliban commander and politician.

== Military activities and political career ==
In the 1980s, Ahmad Khan Samangani originally fought in the Jamiat-e Islami against the Soviet invasion of Afghanistan. After the Soviet withdrawal Samangani, himself an Afghan Uzbek, joined the Uzbek-dominated Junbish-i Milli led by Abdul Rashid Dostum.

In the late 1990s, Samangani commanded thousands of men in his area as a military commander in the Junbish faction of the United Front (Northern Alliance). Though Junbish's main forces were defeated by the Taliban in Mazar-e Sharif in 1998, he and his local forces remained one of several Junbish armed elements operating in the resistance against the Taliban inside Samangan Province, Afghanistan. After the fall of the Taliban regime, he moved closer to Afghan President Hamid Karzai and away from Dostum. But in the 2009 Afghan Presidential Election Samangani supported Abdullah Abdullah against Karzai. Abdul Khan Samangani was said to be close to Balkh governor Ustad Atta Mohammad Noor, also a supporter of Abdullah Abdullah. Lately, Samangani was also said to have made contacts with Dostum again.

Samangani became a member of parliament in 2011 and was considered a key leader in Samangan and northern Afghanistan.

== Death ==
The suicide bombing attack which took place at around 8 am on 14 July 2012 at Samangani's daughter's wedding party killed 22 people and wounded 60. The attack occurred in the capital of Samangan province, Aybak. The attacker came to the party as a guest and embraced Samangani before detonating his explosives.

Among the dead were also the police and intelligence chiefs of Samangan Province, and a division commander of the Afghan National Army (ANA). Balkh governor Atta Mohammad Noor had also been on his way to the wedding, but escaped the attack. After collecting preliminary evidence, Afghan interior minister Bismillah Khan Mohammadi named the Taliban as the main suspects behind the attack.

The assassination was one among several conducted against Afghan government officials in July 2012.
