= Jan Trąbka =

Jan Jakub Trąbka
- Born: 21 June 1931; Kraków, Poland
- Died: 27 July 2012 (aged 81); Kraków, Poland
- Citizenship: Poland
- Education: Jagiellonian University Medical College
- Known for: electroencephalography, neurophysiology, neurology, neuropsychology
- Scientific career
- Fields: Neuroscience
- Workplaces: Jagiellonian University

Jan J. Trąbka (21 June 1931 – 27 July 2012) was a full professor of neurological and computer sciences at the Jagiellonian University Medical College. He went to the Faculty of Medicine of the Kraków Academy of Medicine and received his MD from the Academy of Medicine, Kraków in 1955 and defended his PhD in 1961, thesis entitled "Bioelectric activity of brain within the band 200-500 Hz", in 1964 he defended habilitation dissertation about electrophysiological image of asymmetry of brain hemispheres. Associate professor in 1977, in 1988 designed the full professor. Professor Trąbka has published over 500 publications within the fields of neurology, neurophysiology, neuropharmacology, medical informatics and neurocybernetics, including 15 books.

== Work ==
- 1955-2002 - Kraków Academy of Medicine and Jagiellonian University Medical College
- 1974-1991 the head of the first in Poland Department of Medical Informatics, founded by himself.
- During the period of over 10 years (1991–2002), until retired, he had been a chairman of the Department of Biocybernetics of the Jagiellonian University Medical College
- 1959-1960 – Harvard University, Massachusetts General Hospital in Boston and Massachusetts Institute of Technology, Cambridge, as Rockefeller Foundation fellow
- 1967-1968 - l'Institut Marey (Marey's Institute), Paris, neurophysiology
- 1968-1969 – Neurophysiologie Clinique, Hôpital de la Salpêtrière in Paris, French Academy of Sciences stipend
- 1970-1971 – Psychopharmacological Institute, Austrian Academic of Science , Wien, neuropsychopharmacology
- 1980 – Stony Brook University, New York, Senior Scientist
- 1985 - University of Los Angeles, Visiting professor sponsored by the Kosciusko Foundation
- 1985 - Harvard Medical School, Boston, Visiting professor sponsored by the Kosciusko Foundation

== Memberships ==
- president of the Main Board of the Polish Society of Clinical Neurophysiology, 1989–1993
- president of the Committee of Neurological Sciences of the Polish Academy of Sciences, 1988–1993
- member of the International Institute of Brain Research (IBRO/UNESCO), elected in 1980
- member of the International Society for Neuroimaging in Psychiatry , since 1985
- member of the European Society of Sleep Research, since 1989
- corresponding member of Collegium Europaeum Jenense , since 1991

== Contributions ==
His contributions include:

- high frequency components in brain wave activity - bioelectric activity of brain within the band 200–500 Hz
- anatomopathological correlations with EEG records in the subdural hematoma
- electronystagmographic evaluation of the caloric nystagmus
- antiserotonin activity of 1-methyl-6-methoxy (1,2,3,4-tetrahydrocarboline) (MMTHC)
- the effect of 1-methyl-6-methoxy-1,2,3,4-tetrahydro-2-carboline (Adrenoglomerulotrophine - AGT) on the central nervous system
- 1-methyl-6-methoxy-1,2,3,4-tetrahydrocarboline (THC) and D-lysergic acid diethylamide (LSD) influence on the evoked responses in the associative cortex of the cat brain
- determination of the synaptic action of the THC and -butyrolacton derivatives
- the Bezold-Brucke effect in the pattern of averaged auditory evoked responses
- in two formerly published books: "Brain vs Consciousness" (1983) and "Brain and Its Self" (1991) the author presented his conception of "cybernetic universalism"

== Selected bibliography ==
- TRĄBKA J.: EEG observations of the alterations of consciousness. Electroenceph. Clin. Neurophysiol., 1959, 11, 175.
- BARLOW J. S., TRĄBKA J.: The relationship between photic driving in the EEG and responses to single flashes. Fifth International Congress of Electroencephalography and Clinical Neurophysiology. Rome-Italy, 7-13 Sept. 1961. Exc. Med. Int. Congr. Ser. No 37, 182
- TRĄBKA J.: High frequency components in brain wave activity. Electroenceph. Clin. Neurophysiol., 1962, 14, 453-464
- TRĄBKA J.: The effect of 1-methyl-6-methoxy-1,2,3,4-tetrahydro-2-carboline Adrenoglomerulotrophine (AGT) on the central nervous system. Diss. Pharm., 1964, 16, 419-430
- TRĄBKA J.: Antiserotonin activity of 1-methyl-6-methoxy (1,2,3,4-tetrahydrocarboline) (MMTHC) injected into intraventricular cerebrospinal fluid. Diss. Pharm. Pharmacol. 1966, 18, 539-552
- TRĄBKA J.: Contribution to the formation of theta rhythm in cat hippocampus. Acta Physiologica Polonica, 1967, 18, 6, 699-706
- TRĄBKA J.: Role of the Corpus Callosum. Acta Physiol. Pol. 1968, 19, 1-10
- TRĄBKA J., WOLFARTH S., KAISER J.: Exploration of the deep cerebral structures in the cat by means of benactizine and perphenazine. Diss. Pharm. Pharmacol. 1968, 20, 131-140
- TRĄBKA J. et al.: Influence of Structural Differences of Gyral and Sulcal Areas of the Acoustic Projection Cortex on Primary Induced Acoustic Responses. Acta Physiologica Polonica, v. XIX, No. 5, 1968, p. 564-570.
- TRĄBKA J., PRZEWŁOCKI R., SIUTA J.: The influence of topical administration of the carboline derivatives on direct cortical response (DCR). Diss. Pharm. Pharmacol. 1969, 6, 515–522.
- TRĄBKA J., SEKUŁA J.: EEG disturbances in aphatics. EEG Clin. Neuroph. Elsevier 1978, 45, 14P.
- TRĄBKA J., SZYMUSIK A., GĄTKOWSKI J., GOLDSTEIN M.: EEG in vibration disease. EEG Clin. Neuroph. Kyoto, Japan, Sept. 1981
- TRĄBKA W., TRĄBKA J.: Fractal Consciousness. Third IBRO World Congress of Neuroscience 1991
- TRĄBKA J. et al.: EEG Signals Described by the Automatic Linguistic Analysis. In: Rother M., Zwiener U. (eds): Quantitative EEG Analysis, Universitatsverlag Jena 1993, 114-117
