= Claudio Carudel =

Spanish jockey

- Born: Claude Carudel Carratt; 12 April 1938; Chantilly, Oise, France
- Died: 8 July 2012 (aged 74); Madrid, Spain
- Citizenship: Spanish
- Occupation: Jockey
- Known for: 12 victories in the Madrid Grand Prix

Claude Carudel Carratt, better known as Claudio Carudel (12 April 1938 – 8 July 2012), was a French-born Spanish Jockey who is considered one of the most important jockeys in Spanish in the second half of the 20th century, with a total of twelve victories in the Madrid Grand Prix. He is widely regarded as the best jockey in the history of racing in Spain.

== Early life ==
Claude Carudel was born on 12 April 1938 in Chantilly, near the largest training centre for racehorses in France, as the son of André Carudel, a trainer, who led him into the world of horse racing, achieved his first victory on the Paris racetracks in 1953, aged 15.

== Career ==
In 1957, after only 26 victories in France, the 19-year-old Carudel was given the chance to debut on the Spanish tracks, doing so in the Madrid Grand Prix at the Hipódromo de La Zarzuela, with the horse "Abe de Fuego", trained by a distant relative, Vicente Diez; he finished fifth. He had to wait a few months for his services to be requested again, and this time, he pulled off a surprising victory with this mare from the José Guardiola stable in the prestigious Memorial Duque de Toledo Grand Prix. Within a year of his arrival in Spain, he had already signed a contract and competing regularly in Spain, quickly rising to fame and becoming the most celebrated jockey of the second half of the 20th century thanks to his remarkable career, which included 1,455 victories out of the 6,164 races, an impressive 12 victories in the prestigious Madrid Grand Prix, and even achieved 55 victories abroad.

I trust horses more than men. They are honest and sincere, they will never stab you. I know it is a cliché, but many only need to talk. The horse never forgets who takes care of it, whispers to it, and gives it sugar.

— Claudio Carudel

Throughout his career, Carudel dominated the national jockey rankings, winning the title 18 times and finishing as runner-up on 12 occasions. He was a titular jockey of Count Villapadierna (1968–71) and Ramón Beamonte, but his strongest professional connection was with owner and breeder Antonio Blasco, as he spent 21 years riding for the Rosales stable. During his time with Rosales, Carudel rode many of the finest thoroughbreds, most notably the horse "Chacal" and the mare "Teresa", but also "Wildsun", "Todo Azul", and "Maspalomas". He announced his retirement from the tracks on 20 December 1987, a month after King Juan Carlos I awarded him the Silver Medal of the Royal Order for Sporting Merit, with his last ride being "Ritmo" in February 1988, winning the Cruzcampo Prize at the Pineda racetrack in Seville. By then, he had already transitioned into training, having won the 1987 Madrid Grand Prix with "Casualidad" as both a jockey and trainer.

His success has been attributed to his great consistency and sense of pace, but mainly to his understanding of the horse, being also described as "a wizard of strategy" due to his way of planning the courses, measuring strength, and managing energy. Furthermore, he always maintained a strict diet that made sure he never went beyond 52 kg (115 lb).

== Later life ==
In 2003, Carudel played a key advisory role in helping the La Zarzuela company to reopen the Madrid racetrack, which had been closed for years. Later, in 2005, he became the director of the School of Trades, further cementing his legacy in Spanish horse racing.

== Death ==
Carudel married María del Carmen, with whom he had four children. He died in Madrid on 8 July 2012, at the age of 74.

== Legacy ==
A bronze sculpture of him stands at the south gate of La Zarzuela, and a Grand Prix was named after him.
