= Kevin Best =

Australian artist

Kevin John Best OAM
- Born: 27 January 1932; Newcastle, New South Wales, Australia
- Died: 31 July 2012 (aged 80)
- Occupation: Artist
- Known for: Landscape painting of the Australian bush
- Children: 6
- Awards: Medal of the Order of Australia (2005)

Kevin John Best, OAM (27 January 1932 – 31 July 2012) was an Australian artist.

== Biography ==
Best was born in the Hamilton, New South Wales suburb of Newcastle. He demonstrated skills as an artist at a young age, spending time as a boy sketching warships and airplanes especially during the World War II years. As was typical with many Australian boys in that era, he was a member of the Boy Scouts and spent time bushwalking (hiking) and camping in the Australian bush. His love of the Australian Bush is demonstrated in many of his paintings which evoke images of outback life, stockmen, and family moments in uniquely Australian settings.

Best completed school and commenced work as an office boy with a firm of Sydney-based stockbrokers. During this period Best did not paint or sketch regularly in his spare time. In 1958 he married his wife Dorn and they raised six children. He stayed in the stockbroking industry for 28 years. In 1972 he recommenced painting and drawing in his spare time, and after significant encouragement from family and friends he left his stockbroking career to become a full-time professional artist in September 1977 at the age of 43.

Best was a "self taught" artist who spent many years experimenting with his art, with a strong focus on the use of light reminiscent of the paintings of Australian artist Hans Heysen.

On 26 January 2005, Best was awarded a Medal of the Order of Australia "for service to the arts as a landscape painter, and to the community through fundraising support for a range of charitable organisations".

Best was the father of Australian novelist Mary-Anne O'Connor.

== Paintings ==
Best's paintings have been reproduced in many forms including: calendars, placemats, coasters, prints, limited edition prints and books. During the 1980s and 1990s a range of Australian themed Easter and Christmas biscuit tins (cookie tins) were released through major supermarkets featuring his paintings on the lids.

Best's paintings have been acquired by numerous private and corporate collections throughout Australia and internationally.

His paintings invoke images of simpler times, childhood innocence, natural beauty, the rugged stockman, droving cattle, the roundup and other pastoral or beachside images. His paintings also cover iconic Australian themes developed by Banjo Paterson, CJ Dennis, and other colonial Australian authors.

The first book focusing on Best's art was released in 1996 entitled "A Brush with Light".

In July 2007 a second book called "Secrets of the Brush" was released which Best describes as "the final chapter in my life". The book reproduces photos of many of his most popular works, as well as covering his life, his career, and people and places of significance to his art. The book also covered his painting techniques to allow others to bring to light their own painting abilities.

The 2010 "Top Ten Australian Artists 30th Anniversary" written by Kevin Hill, included the painting "Topping The Rise" as one of the best examples of Kevin Best's work.

== See also ==
- Art of Australia

== Bibliography ==
- Best, Kevin (2007). Secrets of the Brush. NSW: (Publisher to be provided). ISBN ( to be provided ).
- Best, Kevin (1996). A Brush With Light. NSW: (Publisher to be provided). ISBN ( to be provided ).
