= Jorge Legorreta =

Mexican architect (1948–2012)

Jorge Legorreta Gutiérrez

Head of Cuauhtémoc borough
- In office 1997–2000

Personal details
- Born: September 4, 1948 Mexico City, Mexico
- Died: July 17, 2012 (aged 63) Mexico City, Mexico
- Education: National Autonomous University of Mexico, National Polytechnic Institute
- Occupation: Architect, urbanist

Jorge Legorreta Gutiérrez (September 4, 1948, Mexico City – July 17, 2012, Mexico City) was a Mexican architect and urbanist. He was one of the main researchers on the relationship of Mexico City with its former lake environment and the urbanism developed from it, as well as the problems in the management of water resources in the city. Legorreta was also the head of the Cuauhtémoc borough from 1997 to 2000.

== Early life and education ==
Jorge Legorreta Gutiérrez was born on 4 September 1948 in Mexico City. He trained as an architect at the National Autonomous University of Mexico (UNAM), and also graduated from the National Polytechnic Institute (IPN). He subsequently earned a master's degree in sociology and a doctorate in urbanism, both from UNAM, and completed a specialization in urban planning in the German Democratic Republic.

== Academic career ==
Legorreta spent over three decades as a professor and researcher at the Autonomous Metropolitan University (UAM), where he founded the Center for Studies on Mexico City. He also taught at UNAM and the IPN. At the time of his death, he was serving as coordinator of UAM's Mexico City Water Information Centre, an institution he had established.

He was widely regarded as one of the country's foremost specialists in urban expansion and its consequences for the population, the environment, and public policy. His academic colleague Manuel Perló, director of Social Research at UNAM, described Legorreta's body of work as technically rigorous and academically influential, pointing in particular to his early studies on urbanism in oil-producing cities and his landmark research on pollution in Mexico City. Perló noted that from the 1980s onward, Legorreta increasingly wrote for both general and specialist audiences, which gave greater visibility to the problem of water management.

== Research and public commentary ==
Legorreta's scholarly output spanned urban expansion, hydraulic policy, transport, and environmental impact. In 2010 he warned that Mexico City was approaching a water crisis, arguing that infrastructure investment was being directed toward expelling excess water from the city rather than capturing, treating, and reusing rainwater. He was also a critic of the Metrobús rapid-bus system, which he considered poorly integrated with broader transport needs and inevitably destined to become saturated owing to its limited capacity; he argued that an electric traction system would have been the more efficient long-term choice. He predicted that by 2040, the metropolitan areas of Mexico City, Pachuca, Toluca, Cuernavaca, and Cuautla would merge into a single urban conurbation of 36 million inhabitants who would be compelled to develop new methods of rainwater harvesting.

== Media work ==
Alongside his academic and governmental roles, Legorreta was a prominent media figure. He hosted the weekly programme Para descubrir la ciudad on Radio Red and, in 1998, presented México, ciudad de ciudades on Canal Once. In 2004 he hosted the radio series Región líquida on IMER. He was also a regular contributor and columnist for the newspaper La Jornada. Through the agency Metrópolis he organised guided walks and expert-led tours of different parts of the city.

== Death ==
Legorreta died in the early hours of 17 July 2012 in Mexico City at the age of 63, following a stroke. He had been hospitalised for five months at the 20 de Noviembre hospital.

Mexico City's head of government, Marcelo Ebrard, and President Felipe Calderón both offered public condolences.

He was survived by his wife Patricia Montaño and three children: Jordi Legorreta Montaño, Christian Legorreta Ortiz, and Yokoyani Sánchez-Aldana Montaño.

== Published works ==
Among his principal publications were:

- Proceso de urbanización en ciudades petroleras (CECODES, 1983)
- Autoconstrucción de vivienda en México (1984)
- Transporte y contaminación en la ciudad de México (1986)
- Impactos ambientales del crecimiento urbano (CECODES, 1992)
- Humbolt en la Ciudad de México (1999)
- Ciudad de México transformada (2000)
- El agua y la Ciudad de México: de Tenochtitlán a la megalópolis del siglo XXI
- Ciudad de México a debate (UAM, 2008)
- Ríos, lagos y manantiales del Valle de México
- La guía del disfrute

== See also ==
- List of Mexican architects
