= Ron Lienert =

Australian rules footballer

Personal information
- Full name: Ron Lienert
- Born: 10 December 1945 (age 80)
- Original team: Hamilton Imperials
- Height: 178 cm (5 ft 10 in)
- Weight: 71 kg (157 lb)

Playing career^{1}
| Years | Club | Games (Goals) |
| 1964 | Richmond | 2 (0) |
- ^{1} Playing statistics correct to the end of 1964.

Ron Lienert (born 10 December 1945) is a former Australian rules footballer who played with Richmond in the Victorian Football League (VFL).
