= Hamlet Bareh =

Indian historian, writer and film director

- Born: 3 May 1931; Jaiaw Lumsyntiew, Meghalaya, India
- Died: 24 July 2012 (aged 81); Shillong, Meghalaya, India
- Resting place: Church of North India cemetery, Shillong, India; 25°33′45″N 91°52′13″E
- Occupations: Historian; Writer; Filmmaker
- Spouse: Merlicia Kharshiing
- Children: Four children
- Parent(s): Mondon Bareh; Besina Dkhar
- Awards: Padma Shri; Meghalaya Day Award

Hamlet Bareh Ngapkynta (1931–2012) was an Indian writer, historian and film director from the Northeast Indian state of Meghalaya. He is known as the first person from the Khasi tribe, an indigenous ethnic group of the state, to secure a doctoral degree (PhD) and as the maker of the first feature film in the Khasi language, Ka Synjuk Ri ki Laiphew Syiem (The Alliance of Thirty Kings). He was the chairman of the executive committee of the Rajiv Gandhi University, Arunachal Pradesh, and a recipient of the 2004 Meghalaya Day Award. The Government of India awarded him the fourth highest civilian honour of the Padma Shri in 2004.

== Biography ==
Hamlet Bareh was born in Jaiaw Lumsyntiew, a village in the Northeast Indian state of Meghalaya on 3 May 1931 to Besina Dkhar and Mondon Bareh, an educationist, as the youngest of their ten children. He was brought up by his mother as his father died before he turned one and he did his schooling at Jaiaw Practising School, Khasi Jaintia National School and Shillong Boys' Government High School and did his graduate studies at St. Edmund's College, Shillong. His master's studies were at Guwahati University from where he also secured his doctoral degree (PhD) in 1963 for his thesis, The origin and history of the Khasi people, becoming the first Khasi person to receive a doctoral degree. The achievement is reported to have earned him a congratulatory letter from Indira Gandhi, the then Prime Minister of India.

Bareh had started his career while doing his master's degree studies as a teacher at the local Government High School. Later, he would work as a publicity officer of Union Christian College, before joining his alma mater, St. Edmund's College, Shillong, to teach History and Khasi language. After completing his doctoral studies, he resigned from College and took up the post of the Editor of the District Gazetteers of the present day Arunachal Pradesh, then known as North East Frontier Agency (NEFA). He also worked as a visiting fellow of the Indian Institute of Advanced Study, Shimla during 1973–74. When North Eastern Hill University was established in 1974, Bareh was appointed as the Reader, with the responsibility of its continuing education as well as the adult education programmes. He stayed at the university until his retirement in 1996, before which he served the institution as the founder Head and professor of its Centre for Creative Arts.

Towards the later stages of his life, he was appointed as the Chairman of the executive committee of Rajiv Gandhi University, in Arunachal Pradesh. He died at Shillong on 24 July 2012, at the age of 81. His wife, Merlicia Kharshiing, preceded him in death and he was survived by their four children. His body was laid to rest in the Church of North India Cemetery in Shillong.

== Legacy and honours ==
Bareh is reported to have been active in the educational, literary and cultural fronts of the state of Meghalaya. He served as the secretary of the North East India Christian Literature Board and was a member of the North East Council. He was one of the founders of the Synod College, Shillong and was involved with spreading education in the remote areas of the state. He was a member of the Indian Council of Historical Research (1984–87), the Indian Institute of Public Administration, Delhi, Kamarupa Anusandhan Samiti (Assam Research Society), North Eastern Economic Association and the Sardar Patel Society, Delhi. He was associated with the Sahitya Akademi (1981–87) and served as a member of its expert committee. He was also a member of the advisory boards of the State Council of Educational Research and Training, Delhi and the State department of Art and Culture.

Bareh was the president of the Khasi Cultural Society and Khasi Jaiñtia Welfare Association and when the Society produced a feature film, Ka Synjuk Ri Ki Laiphew Syiem (The Alliance of Thirty Kings), he was selected to direct the film. A 35-minute-long short feature film, it was the first ever feature film made in Khasi language and featured a couple of songs written by him. During 1998–2000, he was involved in writing two of his books, under the Emeritus fellowship of the University Grants Commission; he had earlier received the National Fellowship of the UGC.

Besides many articles, Bareh published several books, reported to be over 50, which included The Art History of Meghalaya, William Carey in a new perspective, A Short History of Khasi Literature, The Language and Literature of Meghalaya, The History and Culture of the Khasi People and The Church of England. He also wrote two books, Progress of Education in Meghalaya, and The Distinguished Educationalists of Meghalaya Past and Present, on the education in Meghalaya and an eight-volume encyclopedia, Encyclopaedia of North-east India. Who's who of Men and Women of Achievement (fourth edition-1989) and Learned Asia (volume 1–1992) have listed his name. The Government of Meghalaya honoured him with U Tirot Sing Award on Meghalaya Day on 21 January 2004. Five days later, the Government of India included him in the Republic Day honours list for the civilian honour of the Padma Shri.

== Selected bibliography ==
- Hamlet Bareh (1969). A Short History of Khasi Literature. Don Bosco Press. p. 108. ASIN B0006D2VQW.
- Hamlet Bareh (1977). The Language and Literature of Meghalaya. Indian Institute of Advanced Study. p. 108. ASIN B0000E92ML.
- Hamlet Bareh (1991). The Art History of Meghalaya. Agam Kala Prakashan. p. 222.
- Hamlet Bareh (1991). The Distinguished Educationalists of Meghalaya Past and Present. Khasi Cultural Society. p. 62.
- Hamlet Bareh (1997). The History and Culture of the Khasi People. Spectrum Publications. ISBN 9788185319681.
- Hamlet Bareh (2001). Encyclopaedia of North-east India. Mittal Publications. ISBN 8170997879.
- Hamlet Bareh (2003). Progress of Education in Meghalaya. Cosmo Publications. p. 330. ISBN 9788170206835.
- Hamlet Bareh (2004). William Carey in a new perspective. Spectrum Publications. p. 243. ISBN 9788187502418.
