= Conrade Gamble =

American actor and stuntman

- Born: Conrade Gamble II; June 17, 1967; Chicago, Illinois, U.S.
- Died: July 1, 2012 (aged 45); Los Angeles, California, U.S.
- Education: University of Phoenix
- Occupations: Actor, stuntman

Conrade Gamble II (June 17, 1967 – July 1, 2012) was an American actor and stuntman.

== Life and career ==
Gamble was born in Chicago, Illinois, the son of Charles and Marian Gamble. He attended and graduated from University of Phoenix. After graduating, he served in the United States Marine Corps Reserve during the Gulf War. He began his screen career in 2000, becoming a stuntman in the CBS crime drama television series The District. In 2001, he played a bodyguard in an episode of the ABC spy action thriller television series Alias. In 2002, he performed stunts in Ron Shelton's film Dark Blue.

Later in his career, Gamble performed stunts for actor Ving Rhames in films such as Mission: Impossible III, Give 'Em Hell, Malone and Sin, and he performed stunts in television programs including Grounded for Life, CSI: Crime Scene Investigation, 24, The Guardian, Fastlane, Boomtown, Crossing Jordan and Lincoln Heights. He also performed stunts in numerous films such as Meet the Spartans, School for Scoundrels, The Amazing Spider-Man, The Green Hornet, Evan Almighty, Soul Plane, Janky Promoters, XXX: State of the Union, If I Had Known I Was a Genius, Hostage, The Skeleton Key and A Thousand Words.

== Death ==
Gamble died from natural causes at the Cedars-Sinai Medical Center in Los Angeles, California on July 12, 2012, at the age of 45.
