= Brian Lienert =

Australian rules footballer

Personal information
- Full name: Brian Lienert
- Born: 5 January 1943
- Original team: Hamilton Imperials
- Height: 183 cm (6 ft 0 in)
- Weight: 81 kg (179 lb)

Playing career^{1}
Years	Club	Games (Goals)
1963–64	Richmond	2 (0)
- ^{1} Playing statistics correct to the end of 1964.

Brian Lienert (born 5 January 1943) is a former Australian rules footballer who played with Richmond in the Victorian Football League (VFL) and Dandenong Football Club in the Victorian Football Association (VFA).
