= Berthe Meijer =

German-born Dutch Holocaust survivor and author (1938–2012)

- Born: 21 April 1938; Amsterdam, Netherlands
- Died: 10 July 2012 (aged 74); Amsterdam, Netherlands
- Occupation(s): Author, journalist
- Spouse: Gary Goldschneider

Berthe Meijer (21 April 1938 – 10 July 2012) was a Dutch Holocaust survivor and author. In her memoir of her time imprisoned in Bergen-Belsen concentration camp, she wrote of knowing Anne Frank, which was corroborated by other camp survivors. She was also a culinary journalist and published a cookbook.

== Early life ==
Meijer was born in Amsterdam to a Jewish family in 1938. Before World War II, she lived on the same street where Anne Frank attended a Montessori school. However, they were acquaintances before, because the members of both families had fled Germany during the rise of Adolf Hitler's regime and had begun to reside in the tightly-knit Jewish community in Amsterdam.

They were caught by Nazis in early 1944 and deported from the Netherlands in March 1944. They were also both imprisoned at Bergen-Belsen at the same time. However, Frank and her older sister, Margot Frank, died in a typhus epidemic two weeks before the camp was liberated, while Meijer was released in April 1945 after 13 months. After liberation, Meijer grew up in a Jewish orphanage since her parents had died at Bergen Belsen in January 1945.

== Career ==
Meijer published in 2010 her memoir entitled Life After Anne Frank. The book includes her experience. It states that Frank sisters had told fairy tales to her and other Dutch-speaking children while at Bergen-Belsen and that they, among others, sometimes took care of Dutch children while in the camp. Frank had once attempted writing fairy tales. These last two claims were supported by other Holocaust survivors, and the claim of Frank telling fairy tales was neither proven nor disproven.

In addition to her memoir, Meijer was a culinary journalist who published columns in the Dutch newspaper NRC Handelsblad, as well as a cookbook.

== Death ==
Meijer died of cancer on 10 July 2012. She was survived by her husband, Gary Goldschneider, her sister, her son and two grandchildren.
