= Roland Hyatt =

Personal information
- Full name: Roland Shane Hyatt
- Born: 30 December 1961; Hobart, Tasmania
- Died: 5 July 2012 (aged 50); Hobart, Tasmania
- Nickname: Roley
- Batting: Right-handed
- Bowling: Right-arm off break
- Role: All-rounder

Domestic team information
- Years: Team
- 1983/84–1985/86: Tasmania

Career statistics
| Competition | First-class | List A |
|---|---|---|
| Matches | 21 | 5 |
| Runs scored | 609 | 62 |
| Batting average | 25.37 | 15.50 |
| 100s/50s | 0/3 | 0/0 |
| Top score | 80 | 26 |
| Balls bowled | 2,304 | 216 |
| Wickets | 15 | 3 |
| Bowling average | 74.26 | 50.00 |
| 5 wickets in innings | 0 | 0 |
| 10 wickets in match | 0 | 0 |
| Best bowling | 3/30 | 1/30 |
| Catches/stumpings | 13/– | 2/– |
- Source: Cricinfo, 11 September 2009

Roland Shane Hyatt (30 December 1961 – 5 July 2012) was an Australian former cricketer who played first-class cricket for Tasmania from 1983 to 1986. He played for Clarence District Cricket Club in the Tasmanian Grade Cricket competition.

He was an all rounder who bowled right arm off spin. He made his first-class debut against Victoria at the Melbourne Cricket Ground on 11 November 1983, in a match in which a remarkable 227 by David Boon gave Tasmania first innings points, despite in ending in a draw. Despite taking an excellent catch, his bowling did not impress, and he was dropped for the next match. He was picked again to take on New South Wales at the SCG on what was expected to be a spinning wicket, but again failed to take a wicket.

Hyatt soon learned his most effective deliveries were drifting balls and quickening sliders, two delivery techniques he quickly learned to capitalise on. He took his first Sheffield Shield wicket against Western Australia, dismissing Greg Shipperd with a drifting ball. Hyatt never proved to be a prolific wicket-taker, and his best bowling of 3/30 came by cleaning up the New South Wales tail-order. His prize first-class wicket came in that innings when he claimed the wicket of the Australian test cricket player Bob Holland.

Likewise Hyatt's batting never proved to be effective at first-class level, although he did have a good run of form during the 1985–86 season. In that season he made his highest first-class score of 80, attempting to save a match against South Australia. In a match against Queensland towards the end of that season he wasn't bowled at all, giving the impression then Tasmanian captain Mark Ray had lost faith in him. He played his last match against Victoria at Devonport before being dropped from the side, and returning to grade cricket where he was more successful.
