= Wayne Massarelli =

American make-up artist

Wayne Armand Massarelli (August 30, 1949 – July 13, 2012) was an American make-up artist whose film credits included My Fellow Americans, The Muppets Take Manhattan, The Santa Clause 3: The Escape Clause, These Old Broads and Dr. Jekyll and Mr. Hyde. His television work included Too Rich: The Secret Life of Doris Duke, Karen Sisco, Grace Under Fire, and Tears and Laughter: The Joan and Melissa Rivers Story.

Massarelli was raised in Boston, before moving to California. He began his career by working at a Beverly Hills, California, salon. One of his clients, actress Farrah Fawcett, liked his work and hired him to do her make-up for all of her cosmetic and advertising campaigns, marking his entry into the entertainment industry. His most notable clients for film and television grew to include Lauren Bacall, Dyan Cannon, Joan Rivers, Ann-Margret, and Jane Fonda.

He died from liver cancer in Pasadena, California, on July 13, 2012, at the age of 62. He was survived by his partner, John W. Miller, his mother and his sister.
