= The Whisper of Glocken =

1965 novel by Carol Kendall

- First edition
- Author: Carol Kendall
- Illustrator: Imero Gobbato
- Language: English
- Series: The Minnipins Series
- Genre: Speculative fiction, Fantasy
- Publisher: Odyssey
- Publication date: 1965
- Media type: Print (paperback)
- Pages: 304
- Awards: Newbery Honor, ALA Notable Children's Book, and Ohioana Book Award
- ISBN: 0-590-45103-0
- Preceded by: The Gammage Cup

The Whisper of Glocken is a 1965 children's novel by American author Carol Kendall. It is the second book in the series about the race of little people called the Minnipins, being a sequel to The Gammage Cup. The Minnipin valley is being flooded, and five new unlikely heroes set out on a quest to stop the flooding and save their homes.

== Plot ==
The story begins in Watergap which is the twelfth village along the Watercress river. Beginning with Glocken, the village bell ringer, the villagers begin to notice that their village is flooding. The flooding is unnatural even taking into account the recent heavy rains. The villagers soon realize that they must flee their village to escape being drowned by the flood.

During the evacuation a group of five villagers come together who will become Kendall's central heroes. First of these is Glocken, the town bell ringer who has become obsessed with adventure after reading the account of the battle against the mushrooms; Scumble, the town fish presser and sluice gate keeper; Crustabread the loner; Gam Lutie, a village elder who is overly concerned about her family treasure; and a minnipin woman name Silky.

These five minnipins travel down the flooded river to Slipper on the Water, the town in which the heroes of The Gammage Cup live, Glocken is excited that he will finally meet these heroes at last. When they arrive at Slipper on the Water, they are taken in by the villagers. During the beginning of their stay, he briefly meet each of the heroes but fails to recognize them for who they are. After being fed soup he is taken to the house of Mingy and Muggles to sleep.

The next morning, Glocken meets with his four other companions and the five heroes from The Gammage Cup. They are tasked mistakenly given the task of finding out what is blocking the Watercress River and removing it. They also discuss an ancient relic called The Whisper of Glocken, a bell supposed to have magical powers. A stone with a map on it that Glocken has brought with him that has been passed through his family leads Walter the Earl to believe that The Whisper is hidden in Frostbite near where the blockage is. Glocken finally realizes the identity of the five heroes and is rather disappointed because they seem too ordinary and flawed.

The Old Heroes take The New Heroes to the knoll to begin their quest. Together they travel through the tunnel in the Sunset Mountains which was mined by the Mushrooms in The Gammage Cup. They roll away the stones blocking the entrance and seeing that they can no longer assist the New Heroes, The Old Heroes leave them to their quest. The Old Heroes leave them with a supply of fishcakes, medicines (including the magic salve of the Mushrooms), a book of maxims created by Muggles, and a bag of gold coins. Crustabread is also given Mingy's sand colored cloak that he used to hide from the Mushrooms.

Finally left to their own devices, the New Heroes begin to prepare for the journey through this forbidding desert. While the others are busying themselves looking for water or examining the items that have been left behind for them by the Old Heroes, Scumble goes off to look for anything that might be edible in the desert. He attempts to dig up a root which has put forth a few stems however finding the ground to be "iron hard" (70) he goes off for a spade to dig it up with. When he comes back, however, he finds a hole with the root lying at the bottom of it. The others find him with the root and ask what happened. They dismiss his conjecture that an invisible animal dug the hole and tell him that he only got confused and went to a different place the second time. They use a sword to cut the root, which they call a "moon melon", find out that the inside smells strongly like rotting vegetation. Scumble, who is the only person willing to try it, finds it to be cooling and refreshing. The others are disgusted and refuse to eat the moon melon. While the others are busy, Scumble scrapes around the base of every moon melon plant between the hole and the tunnel. Before going to sleep, the New Heroes roll the boulder back across the entrance to the tunnel. The next morning, the five line up to push the boulder away from the entrance and push it and themselves out into space.

Silkie lands with a thud, slowly becomes aware of a whimpering noise, and sits up to find herself and the others in a deep pit. The whimpering is coming from a small fuzzy creature pinned under the boulder the New Heroes had pushed away from the entrance to the cave. Bigger creatures begin dropping into the pit, they imitate Silkie's efforts to push the boulder off the small creature's leg, and the injured creature is freed. Gam Lutie realizes that the fuzzy creatures dug the pit they are in and that Scumble is to blame. He wanted moon melons dug up and the Diggers, as the New Heroes begin calling them, dug the pit. All the New Heroes eat the melon that Scumble and the Diggers dig from the side of the pit. Scumble wishes there were a way to get someone out of the pit so that the Diggers could be shown how to fill in the pit, and Glocken comes up with the idea of a human pyramid against the side of the pit. Once out of the pit, Glocken shows the Diggers (who climbed out easily) what he wants them to do. An hour later, the other four and the baby Digger are able to walk out of the pit. Another hour later, the pit is completely filled in and the New Heroes have access to the shade of the tunnel.
