= Jerold Starr =

Jerold M. Starr (May 12, 1941 – July 13, 2012) was an American writer, professor, and social activist.

== Biography ==
He was born in Detroit, Michigan, where he attended Mumford High School and Montieth College of Wayne State University. Starr earned a Ph.D. in sociology from Brandeis University in 1970. He taught 1969–76 at the University of Pennsylvania, 1976–2002 at West Virginia University and 2004–08 at the University of California at San Diego. Since 1980 he has lived in Pittsburgh, Pennsylvania.

Among his many awards, Starr has been a Fulbright Scholar, National Endowment for the Humanities Fellow and recipient of the Alfred McClung Lee Award from Sociological Abstracts for "Distinguished Career as a Humanist Sociologist."

Starr's works have focused on two areas: One is peace and conflict resolution, organized in the 1980s under "The Lessons of the Vietnam War" program of the Center for Social Studies Education. This program received the Veterans for Peace Medal for Educational Achievement and has been used in about 3,500 colleges and secondary schools. In the 1990s he founded Citizens for Independent Public Broadcasting, an effort to bring greater diversity to public television and media reform throughout the PBS and NPR systems.

Since 1984, Starr has been active in theatre as a board member, producer, actor, and playwright.

== Works ==
- Social Structure and Social Personality, nonfiction (Boston: Little, Brown, 1974)
- Cultural Politics: Radical Movements in Modern History, nonfiction (New York: Praeger, 1985)
- The Lessons of the Vietnam War: A Modular Textbook, nonfiction (Pittsburgh: Center for Social Studies Education, 1988)
- Air Wars: The Fight to Reclaim Public Broadcasting, nonfiction (Boston: Beacon Press, 2000)
- Buried: The Sago Mine Disaster, play (Pittsburgh: Pittsburgh Playwrights Theatre, 2006)
- Interesting Times, play (Pittsburgh: Pittsburgh Playwrights Theatre, 2008)
