= The Gammage Cup =

1959 novel by Carol Kendall

- First edition
- Author: Carol Kendall
- Illustrator: Erik Blegvad
- Language: English
- Series: The Minnipins Series
- Genre: Speculative fiction, Fantasy
- Publisher: Harcourt Brace, Scholastic
- Publication date: 1959
- Media type: Print (paperback)
- Pages: 283
- Awards: Newbery Honor, ALA Notable Childrens Book, and Ohioana Book Award
- ISBN: 0-590-45103-0
- Preceded by: The Other Side of the Tunnel
- Followed by: The Whisper of Glocken

The Gammage Cup is a children's book by Carol Kendall. It was first published in 1959 in the United Kingdom as The Minnipins and in the United States as The Gammage Cup. It was later republished by Scholastic in November 1991 and by Harcourt in 2000. It tells the story of a race of little people called the Minnipins who, despite inner divisions, must unite to defend their village and the valley in which they live against an evil race of humanoid creatures called the Mushrooms or Hairless Ones. The sequel, The Whisper of Glocken, was published in 1965.

Themes in the book include conformity and individualism. The book also includes several references to the real world including the poem Mary Had a Little Lamb and several common abbreviations such as Ltd., Co., Bros., etc. It was highly praised and became a Newbery Honor book and an ALA Notable Children's Book. Audiobook and cartoon versions of the book were also created.

== Background and publication history ==
Caroll Kendall became interested in writing for children when her first novel The Black Seven was published in 1946. She enjoyed writing about children and eventually decided to write children's stories. Of her first forays into fantasy writing she says, "I thought I didn't know enough to write fantasy, and then suddenly I had a theme to work on and gradually the characters became real". Kendall's main character Muggles was inspired by a friend who often joked about being in a muddle. an article in Child Life inspired her to write about the dangers of conformity. She said:

It was about a costume party, and went something like this: 'Everybody' was having costume birthday parties that year—it was the very latest fad and the mothers met in protest to plan an end to their children's obsessive copy-catism. When the day of the party finally came and the children began to arrive at the birthday house, they found that their secret costumes were exactly like all the other secret costumes. They were a party of sheep.

The Gammage Cup was illustrated by Erik Blegvad and was first published in 1959 by Harcourt Brace in New York. The copyright on the book expired and was renewed in 1987. It was later published by Scholastic in 1991 and then by Harcourt in 2000 with cover art by Tim and Greg Hildebrandt. The book was also published in the United Kingdom under the title of The Minnipins. Its sequel The Whisper of Glocken was published in 1965.

== Summary ==
Map of the Land Between the Mountains by Erik Blegvad.

=== Setting ===
The story starts in a fictional valley named the Land Between the Mountains. It is surrounded by four mountain ranges: Snowdrift to the north, Frostbite to the south, the Sunrise Mountains to the east and the Sunset Mountains to the west. This valley is populated by twelve villages of Minnipins, a race of industrious "little people" rather like hobbits. The novel takes place in a village called Slipper-on-the-Water, in and around the gold mines in the Sunset Mountains and on a nearby knoll where the outlaws live. The date of the story is given as the year of Gammage

=== Plot ===
Slipper-on-the-Water is home to a clan known as the Periods, who are descendants of Fooley the Magnificent or the Great Fooley, who 440 years before the book opens constructed a balloon, flew to the land beyond the mountains and returned with a case of curiosities. They hold high offices in Slipper-on-the-Water, have very high opinions of themselves and have a "Council of Periods" that rules the village. Also living in the village are a group of Minnipins referred to as "Them" by the other villagers. These include Gummy, Walter the Earl and Curley Green. "Them" shun the tradition-based existence of the other Minnipins. One night, a Minnipin named Muggles wakes up and sees fires in the Sunset Mountains in the West. While digging for treasure, Walter the Earl discovers a vault under his house and finds iron chests that contain ancient scrolls, swords, armor and military trumpets. The scrolls reveal Fooley the Magnificent's story and contain ominous warnings from Walter the Earl's forebear Walter the Obtuse saying that the vault will be found when it is needed for the protection of the Minnipins.

The mayor returns from the annual meeting of village mayors with news that there will be a contest to find the finest village in the Land Between the Mountains. The winning village will win the legendary and sacred Gammage Cup. The villagers are excited but the Periods convince the villagers that "Them" will ruin their chances of winning the cup. During a town meeting, the Periods outlaw "Them". Mingy, the curmudgeonly money-keeper who resists spending money for "fancying up the village" is also outlawed. Along with Muggles who has become involved with "Them" because of her seeing the fires on the Sunset Mountains.

The "Outlaws" paddle up the river to Gummy's stone cabin on The Knoll. They move in but the cabin is too small for all of them, so they decide to sleep outside until a new house is built. Muggles organizes their working efforts and after much progress is made, they explore the Old Mines in the Sunset Mountains. Walter the Earl brings an iron sword from the vault. Inside the mines the sword glows as a warning, and they hear tapping sounds. After this phenomenon occurs again, they assume that the legendary enemies of the Minnipins known as The Mushrooms have returned and are preparing to attack, and they hold a council of war.

Muggles decides that Mingy should reconnoiter the Old Mines while the rest of the "Outlaws" wait behind. In the mines, Mingy sees several hairless creatures with mushroom-colored skin round bellies and big ears and wearing tight, brownish-white clothes. Over 200 of them emerge from the mines. Mingy concludes that these must be the Mushrooms and tries to return to the others, but his is foot is trapped in the rocks. The rest of the Outlaws rush to save Mingy as the Mushrooms swarm to capture him. They chase most of the Mushrooms away but four of them capture Mingy and carry him into the mountain. Gummy chases them into the Old Mines and returns after he is hit by a poisonous spear.

The group return to Gummy's cabin to tend to his worsening wound. Curly Green and Muggles stay and defend Gummy while Walter the Earl returns to Slipper-on-the-Water to raise an army to fight the Mushrooms. Walter the Earl tries to tell the Periods mayor and council about the coming Mushroom army but they will not listen. He decides to raise the village without the help of the Periods. He is successful, but the Periods tell the villagers the Walter is deranged and the villagers are uncertain what to do. An eerie chanting is heard from the mountains.

In the Old Mines, the Mushroom chief refuses to kill Mingy. One of the Mushrooms is scratched by a poison spear and Mingy watches as a white substance is used on the scratch, and thinks this may help his foot. After the Mushrooms leave to fight, he puts some on his foot, which feels better. The Mushroom army attacks the cabin where Gummy, Curly Green and Muggles are hiding. Gummy becomes weak because of the poison from the spear and Curly Green is knocked out while Muggles wards off the Mushrooms. The Minnipin army attacks and a fierce battle ensues. As the Mushrooms flee back into the Old Mines, Mingy sets a heap of mats on fire, making it impossible for the Mushrooms to escape. They rush out to escape the flames and are defeated by the Minnipin army. Mingy emerges from the cave holding the pot of white substance which is used cure Gummy and the injured Minnipins soldiers.

The Period village council regrets expelling the Outlaws and no longer cares about winning the Gammage Cup. The villagers celebrate the return of the soldiers and the five Outlaws. The three judges of the contest arrive. Witnessing the happy scene, they decide that Slipper-on-the-Water is the most deserving village and leave the Gammage Cup in the town square.

== Characters ==
=== Outlaws ===
- Muggles: Minnipin candy maker who accidentally becomes involved with "Them"..
- Gummy: an extremely idle and carefree Minnipin who wears yellow and makes up rhymes..
- Walter the Earl: apparently descended from a long line of earls, Walter the Earl looks for treasures that he believes are hidden in his yard.
- Curly Green: an artist who paints but does no real work.
- Mingy: a money keeper who opposes any frivolous spending and at the end a brave man.

=== Periods ===
The Periods are descendants of Fooley the "magnificent". They are each given one of the "names" from Fooley's book. They tend to have positions of prominence in the Minnipin society.

- Wm.: the village poet (pronounced "Wim")
- Geo.: the village painter
- Co.: the town clerk
- Ltd.: the mayor of Slipper-on-the-Water (pronounced "Litted")
- Etc.: an inventor (pronounced "Et-cuh")

=== Villagers ===
Most of the villagers are distinguished by their trade and their names.

- Dingle the Miller: also the village songmaster.
- Fin Longtooth: the oldest inhabitant
- Thatch the Roofer
- Reedy: wife of Crambo the basketmaker, a friend of Muggles before she is outlawed
- Spill the Candlemaker: poor because Etc.'s reed light make his business less profitable

=== Other Minnipins ===
- Gammage: the revered first leader of the Minnipins in the valley
- Fooley: A foolish Minnipin who accidentally left the valley in a toy balloon and returned with a case of curiosities from his voyage. After his return, he and his descendants become revered and unquestioned leaders.
- Walter the Seventeenth Earl / Walter the Obtuse: one of Walter the Earl's predecessors who buries swords, armor, and other items in his yard
- The Three Strangers: the judges of the contest for the "Gammage Cup"

=== Mushrooms ===
The Mushrooms are big bellied, mushroom colored, have almost no hair, and smell like mushrooms. They speak a strange language and are all killed and burned in a funeral pyre.

== Themes ==
The main theme in the book is conformity versus nonconformity. Kendall uses five characters who do not fit in with their society but are able to show their worth in saving it. The New York Times Book Review called the book a "fable about conformists and non-conformists". A reviewer from the Black Gate said the book is "a warning against 1950's conformist tendencies".

Another theme used in the book is uniting against a common foe. Although the Periods and the outcasts are initially in opposition to one another, they are forced to reconcile their differences when they are all threatened by the Mushrooms. The theme of individualism are prevalent throughout the book. When Muggles is invited to return to the village by Ltd., she tells him she is no longer "poor simple Muggles" (184) and has gained individuality in her life at the knoll. Horn Book said that the book offers "insights into the value of individualism". Muggles' heroism makes the book appear feminist; Kendall neither confirmed or denied this, saying "I just write the way it is".

Another theme is a kind of military racism, or species-ism. The Mushrooms are clearly described as different, although they would seem to be human, to some extent. However, when it comes to battle, the Mushrooms are treated like non-humans or animals—alien. Killing them is necessary, impersonal, and raises no questions of conscience. The Minnipins feel no pity for their enemy, even as the story describes the shrieks from the Mushrooms as they are killed.

== Reception ==
A review of the book by Horn Book Magazine said, "This highly creative fantasy ... will be a gift book treasured by the entire family" (Back cover). The New York Times Book Review called it "highly amusing, imaginative, and thought provoking". In 2001, a review in Black Gate described The Gammage Cup as readable and enjoyable with a cute turn of phrase and clever notions, though standing "at best in the second rank of the great children's fantasies." The reviewer said it includes the typical 1950s themes of conformity and the threat from outsiders.

=== Awards and recognition ===
The Gammage Cup was named a Newbery Honor Book for 1960. It was one of Horn Book's best books of 1959 and won the Ohioana book award in 1960.

=== Harry Potter Lawsuit ===
Interest in the book was revived during the 1999 lawsuit between Nancy Stouffer and J.K. Rowling over the creation of the name "Muggles". An article in the Lawrence Journal-World on June 14, 2000, said Kendall had used the name about 30 years before Stouffer and Rowling. Kendall found the incident amusing and was not ill-disposed towards either author. Speaking about the copying, she said, "I've got no quarrel with them ... There's only so many ideas and if you have one then someone else out there probably has the same one, too."

== Adaptations ==
=== Films ===
A cartoon version of "The Gammage Cup" was created by Hanna-Barbera and aired on CBS Storybreak in 1982 and was later aired with closed captions. The cartoon stuck to the main premise of the book but changed the storyline.

=== Audiobooks ===
An audiobook version of "The Gammage Cup" was produced by Recorded Books in 2000. It was read by Christina Moore who was praised by School Library Journal, which said it conveys "the full emotional range of each character". The reviewer also said, "Moore consistently nails the perfect tone of the story" and, "this delightful fantasy is sure to please fans on several levels—humor, suspense, plot twists, winsome characters, and adventure".
