= Howard Dorgan =

Appalachian-American religious historian

Claude Howard Dorgan (July 5, 1932 – July 5, 2012) was an American academic best known for his research and writing on the topic of religion in Appalachia.

Dorgan was a native of Ruston, Louisiana. After study at the University of Texas at El Paso, where he received a bachelor's degree, and the University of Texas at Austin, which awarded him a masters of fine arts degree, he spent nine years as a teacher in secondary schools in Idaho and Texas, followed by three years as a forensics coach at Lamar University in Texas. He then enrolled for further study at Louisiana State University, where he earned his Ph.D. in speech communication in 1971.

After obtaining his Ph.D., Dorgan joined the faculty of the Department of Communication of Appalachian State University, serving there from 1971 until his retirement in 2000. A fascination with the rhythmical style of Appalachia's old-time Baptist preachers led him into more than thirty years of rhetorical and ethnographic research on religion in Appalachia, with a particular focus on traditional Baptist sub-denominations indigenous to the region. He served as editor for the religion section of the Encyclopedia of Appalachia.

He received the 1993 Thomas Wolfe Literary Award for the book Airwaves of Zion: Radio Religion In Appalachia.

== Books ==
- The Oratory of Southern Demagogues, with Calvin Logue. Louisiana State University Press, 1981.
- Giving Glory To God in Appalachia: Worship Practices of Six Baptist Subdenominations. University of Tennessee Press, 1987.
- A New Diversity in Contemporary Southern Rhetoric, with Calvin Logue. Louisiana State University Press, 1987.
- The Old Regular Baptists of Central Appalachia: Brothers and Sisters in Hope. University of Tennessee Press, 1989.
- Airwaves of Zion: Radio Religion In Appalachia. University of Tennessee Press, 1993.
- In the Hands of a Happy God: The No Hellers of Central Appalachia. University of Tennessee Press, 1997.
