= Stefan Siczek =

Catholic bishop

- Auxiliary Bishop of the Diocese of Radom
- Church: Roman Catholic Church
- See: Roman Catholic Diocese of Radom
- In office: 1992–2012

Orders
- Ordination: May 27, 1961
- Consecration: April 11, 1992 by Józef Glemp

Personal details
- Born: September 20, 1937 Siczki, Poland
- Died: 31 July 2012 (aged 74) Radom, Poland

Stefan Siczek (September 20, 1937 – July 31, 2012) was a Polish prelate of the Roman Catholic Church.

Siczek was born in Siczki and entered the Major Seminary in Sandomierz in 1955. He was ordained a priest on May 27, 1961.

In 1963, he entered the Catholic University of Lubin, where he graduated with a masters’ degree in Canon Law; he completed his doctorate in Canon Law in 1971.

He was spiritual director of the Sandomierz Seminary from 1972 to 1986, before becoming chaplain to the Congregation of the Sisters Servants of the Blessed Virgin Mary Immaculate in Mariowka.

Siczek was appointed auxiliary bishop of the Diocese of Radom as well as titular bishop of Dagnum on March 25, 1992 and ordained bishop on April 11, 1992.

In 1993 he began teaching Canon Law at the Cardinal Stefan Wyszynski University in Radom.

Siczek died at the Major Seminary in Radom aged 74. He is buried at the Tomb of the Bishops of Radom in Radom.

== See also ==
- Diocese of Radom
