= Edith Newman Devlin =

Irish academic and writer

Edith Newman Devlin MBE
- Born: Edith Florence Gaw; 21 September 1926; Swords, County Dublin, Ireland
- Died: 2 July 2012 (aged 85); Belfast, Northern Ireland
- Education: Trinity College Dublin

Edith Newman Devlin MBE (21 September 1926 – 2 July 2012) was an Irish lecturer in the English, French, and extramural departments of Queen's University Belfast.

== Early life and education ==
Edith Newman Devlin was born Edith Florence Gaw in Swords, County Dublin, on 21 September 1926. Her parents were Hugh and Eva Gaw (née Newman). Her father had been a chief petty officer in the Royal Navy who later became the gatekeeper in St Patrick's Hospital in Dublin, and her mother was a primary school teacher in a Church of Ireland school. She had three older brothers and one older sister. The family moved into the gatelodge at the hospital when Devlin was two months old. Her mother died of cancer when Devlin was almost five years old, which affected the family greatly. Devlin recalled the difficulty of being a poor Protestant family and how she had few friends. This led to her embracing reading and literature, as she attended the local Church of Ireland national school and the Diocesan School for Girls, Adelaide Road. Having received a scholarship, she then attended Alexandra College in Milltown, going on to Trinity College Dublin to study modern languages and English. She graduated with a first-class degree in French and English in 1948, and was awarded the vice-chancellor's prize for prose composition and the Leroy Stein exhibition. In 1947, she won the Littledale prize, which in 1948 was awarded to her future husband, David Douglas "Peter" Devlin. They married in 1951, and moved to England, where her husband lectured in Oxford and Leeds. Devlin lived in Paris for a time, beginning a postgraduate degree at the University of the Sorbonne, but she did not complete it. The couple had two sons and a daughter.

== Career ==
The Devlins lived in Glasgow for a time, before moving to Belfast in 1961. Here her husband lectured in the English department of Queen's University Belfast (QUB), eventually becoming a professor of English Literature. Devlin began tutoring in the French department. At this time married couples working in the same department was unusual and not approved of by the administration, so Devlin was surprised when she was offered a tutoring position in the English department. She was later promoted to lecturer, teaching short courses with the departments of English and French on literature from 1969. It was as part of the QUB extramural department that she developed a reputation. Teaching these courses for 44 years, her courses were consistently over-subscribed and were believed the most popular of their kind in Great Britain or Ireland. Students were brought from all over Ulster on specially organised buses, and some travelled from Dublin and Sligo for her morning lecturers on Wednesdays. These Wednesday lectures were eventually held in the largest lecture theatre available in QUB in Whitla Hall. Each year the courses would be on new subject matter, Devlin stressing the importance that the literature being studied should be relevant to contemporary life. She was awarded a Master's degree from Trinity College Dublin in 1954.

In 1988, she received an MBE, and in 1993 an honorary D.Litt. from QUB.

Devlin published her book, Speaking volumes: a Dublin childhood, in 2000. The book drew on her experiences growing up in Dublin in the 1930s and 1940s as part of a working-class Protestant family combined with Devlin's response to a number of English literary classics. She explored her difficult relationship with her father, which continued into adulthood, and her regret that he did not aid her in remembering her mother. As part of her extramural courses, she organised literary trips with her students, travelling to Europe, the Middle East, and countries in Africa. After her retirement, she continued her weekly lecturing, giving her last course weeks before she died on 2 July 2012.
