= Ovadia Harari =

- עובדיה הררי
- Born: September 3, 1943; Cairo, Egypt
- Died: July 15, 2012 (aged 68); Israel
- Education: Technion, INSEAD
- Occupation: Aerospace engineer
- Known for: Contribution to the IAI Lavi project
- Awards: Israel Defense Prize (1969, 1975), Israel Prize (1987)

Ovadia Harari (Hebrew: עובדיה הררי; September 3, 1943, Cairo, Egypt – July 15, 2012, Israel) was an Egyptian-born Israeli aerospace engineer. He was a two-time recipient of the Israel Defense Prize (1969 and 1975) and a recipient of the Israel Prize, the country's highest civilian honor, in 1987 for his contribution to the IAI Lavi project.

Harari was a graduate of the Technion and received an MBA from INSEAD in France. He was influential in the development of Israel Aerospace Industries.

He died on July 15, 2012, at the age of 68 and was buried in Hod HaSharon.
