= Hugó Gruber =

Hungarian actor

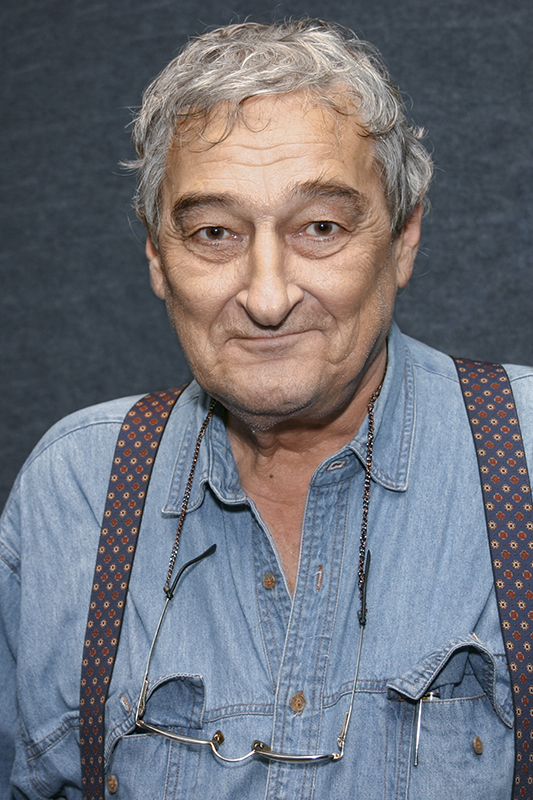
Gruber Hugó

Hugó Gruber (28 May 1938 – 3 July 2012) was a Hungarian stage and film actor.

He was the Hungarian dubbing voice of Ian McDiarmid in the Star Wars Prequel Trilogy, and in Return of the Jedi VHS edition, 1992.

== Selected filmography ==
- Szomszédok (1991-1993)

== Animation ==
- Marci és a kapitány (1973) (voice)

== Bibliography ==
- Magyar színházművészeti lexikon. ed. Székely György. Budapest: Akadémiai. 1994. ISBN 963-05-6635-4
- MTI ki kicsoda 2009. Szerk. Hermann Péter. Budapest: Magyar Távirati Iroda. 2008. ISBN 978-963-1787-283
