= Gaylon Lawrence =

American businessman (1934–2012)

Gaylon M. Lawrence (March 15, 1934 – July 10, 2012) was an American businessman and farmer.

Lawrence owned more than 165,000 acres of farmland in Illinois, Missouri, Arkansas and Mississippi and was the owner of U.S. Airconditioning Distributors, the world's largest privately owned heating, ventilation and air conditioning distributor. His family also owned five community banks and 30,000 acres of citrus farms, making his companies Florida's largest producer of fresh fruit.

Lawrence graduated from Piggott Arkansas High School and from Iowa State University in 1955 with a degree in agriculture/economics. From 1955 to 1960, he served in the U.S. Air Force.
