= Ennio Cardoni =

Italian footballer (1929-2012)

Personal information
- Date of birth: February 21, 1929
- Place of birth: Livorno, Italy
- Date of death: July 14, 2012 (aged 83)
- Position: Defender

Senior career*
Years	Team	Apps	(Gls)
1948–1949	Siena	38	(3)
1949–1950	Ancona	39	(?)
1950–1953	Livorno	76	(2)
1953–1956	Genoa	92	(1)
1956–1957	Roma	23	(0)
1957–1958	Atalanta	18	(0)
1958–1961	Lecco	84	(1)
- * Club domestic league appearances and goals

Ennio Cardoni (February 21, 1929 – July 14, 2012) was an Italian professional football player.

Cardoni was born in Livorno. He played for 6 seasons (147 games, 1 goal) in the Serie A for Genoa C.F.C., A.S. Roma, Atalanta B.C. and Calcio Lecco 1912.
