= Marceau Stricanne =

French footballer (1920–2012)

Personal information
- Date of birth: 1 January 1920
- Place of birth: Lomme, France
- Date of death: 25 July 2012 (aged 92)
- Position: Midfielder

Senior career*
Years	Team	Apps	(Gls)
1943–1944	EF Lens-Artois		
1945–1948	Roubaix-Tourcoing	63	(17)
1948	Stade Français	9	(0)
1948–1954	Le Havre	151	(16)

International career
1951	France	1	(0)
- * Club domestic league appearances and goals

Marceau Stricanne (1 January 1920 – 25 July 2012) was a French footballer who played for Le Havre, EF Lens-Artois, Roubaix-Tourcoing and Stade Français. He also made an appearance for France national team during a match against Austria in 1951 as a substitution of Thadée Cisowski.
