= Daphne Zepos =

- Born: July 13, 1959; Athens, Greece
- Died: July 3, 2012 (aged 52); San Francisco, California
- Occupations: Chef, writer, cheesemaker

Daphne Zepos (13 July 1959 — 3 July 2012) was a Greek-born author, chef, educator and cheese aficionado. At various times in her career, she was associated with the Artisanal Cheese Center, where she was employed as affineur, the Essex Street Cheese Company (which she co-founded), the Cheese of Choice Coalition and was a co-owner of the Cheese School of San Francisco. She wrote articles about cheese for The Atlantic magazine.

== See also ==
- List of cheesemakers
