= Walter Lienert =

American gymnast and coach

Walter "Lefty" Lienert (January 10, 1925 – July 1, 2012) was an American gymnastics coach and judge. He was inducted into the USA Gymnastics Hall of Fame in 1974.
