= Fioravante Perrotta =

Fioravante "Fred" G. Perrotta (26 July 1931 – 20 July 2012) was an American lawyer, political aide, and political candidate. He worked as an aide to New York governor Nelson Rockefeller in the late 1950s and early 1960s, and then for New York City mayor John Lindsay a decade later. Perrotta held a diverse range of positions throughout New York government, including finance administrator, and insurance regulator.

Perrotta was born in Long Island, New York. He attended St. John's University as an undergraduate, and then St. John's University School of Law to obtain his law degree. Perrotta initially worked for the U.S. Attorney's office in Manhattan, and later moved into private practice. He began working for Rockefeller's office in 1959, and for Mayor Lindsay's in 1968.

In 1967, Perrotta became vice president of the United States Life Insurance Company. After unsuccessfully running for controller in New York in 1969, he worked as a campaign manager for Richard Nixon in New York in the 1972 election. Perrotta died July 20, 2012, in Naples, Florida.
