= 2012 in Norway =

- Centuries: 19th; 20th; 21st
- Decades: 1990s; 2000s; 2010s; 2020s
- See also: List of years in Norway

Events in the year 2012 in Norway.

== Incumbents ==
- Monarch – Harald V.
- President of the Storting – Dag Terje Andersen (Norwegian Labour Party)
- Prime Minister – Jens Stoltenberg (Norwegian Labour Party)

== Events ==
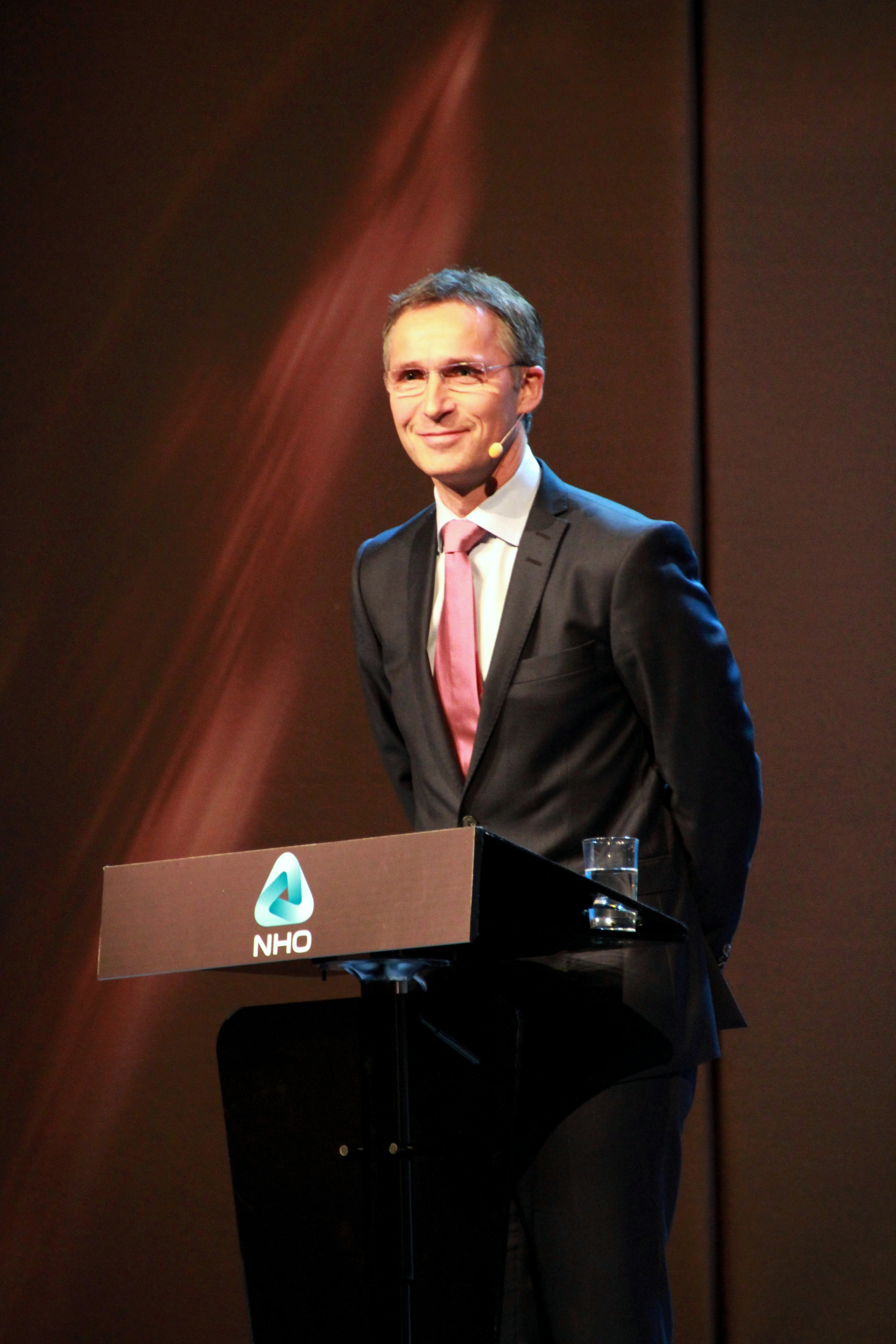
Norwegian Prime Minister Jens Stoltenberg at the NHO Aarskonferanse, in January 2012.

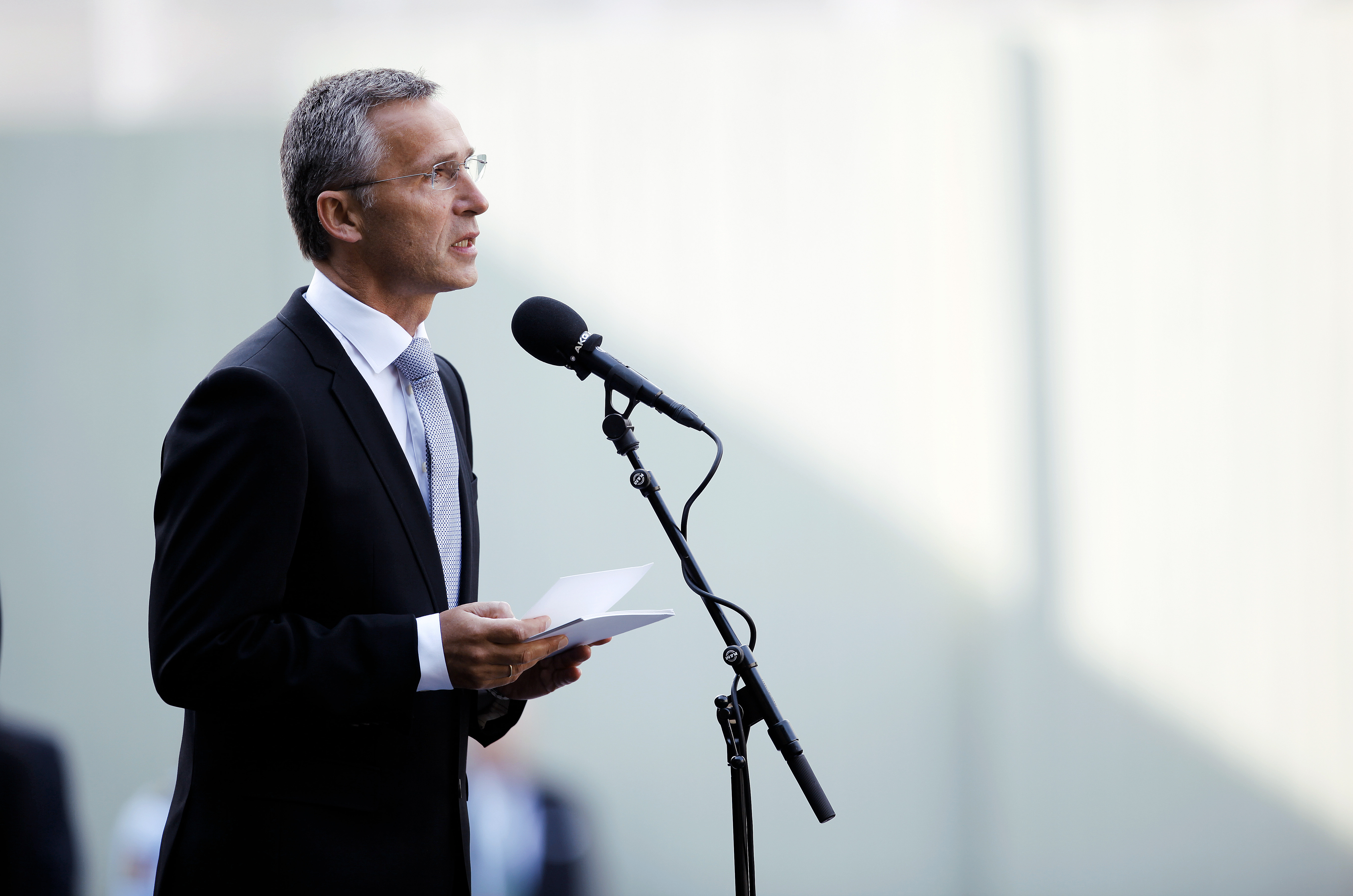
Norwegian Prime Minister Jens Stoltenberg at the Oslo Cathedral to attends the ceremony commemorates the first anniversary of the 2011 Norway attacks.

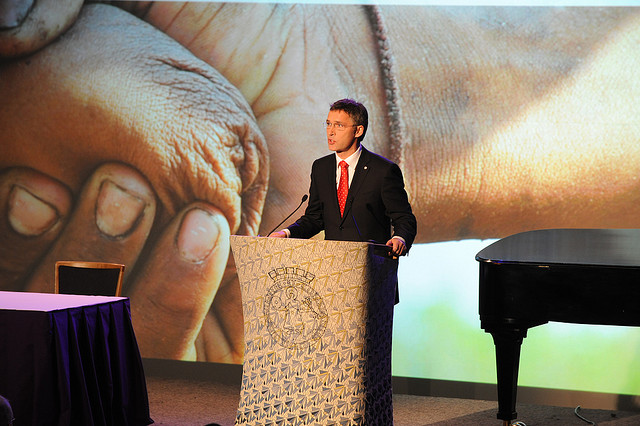
Norwegian Prime Minister Jens Stoltenberg at the Signing Conference for the Convention on Cluster Munitions, on 3 October 2012.

=== March ===
- 15 March – Five Norwegian soldiers died in an aircraft accident in northern Sweden.
- 19 March – Six tourists are buried in an avalanche in Gáivuotna Municipality (Kåfjord), Norway, leaving four dead and one missing.

=== April ===
- 10 April – A second psychiatric evaluation finds that Breivik's sane enough to face trial for the 2011 terrorist attacks and serve a prison sentence if convicted.
- 16 April – Breivik's trial of confessed perpetrator of the 2011 Norway attacks, starts in Oslo, Norway.

=== May ===
- 1 May – Norwegian world swimming champion and Olympic medalist Alexander Dale Oen dies at age 26 after suffering a cardiac arrest during a training camp in Flagstaff, Arizona.
- 15 May – A man sets himself on fire outside the Oslo courthouse where mass murderer Anders Behring Breivik is on trial for the 2011 Norway attacks.

=== July ===
- 22 July – Norway commemorates the first anniversary of the 2011 attacks.

=== August ===
- 4 August – Death of Sigrid Schjetne in Oslo

=== October ===
- 17 October – Netflix becomes available to Norwegian consumers.

=== December ===
- 14 December – The Làhku National Park was established in Gildeskål Municipality, Meløy Municipality and Beiarn Municipality in Nordland county.

== Popular culture ==
=== Music ===
- Norway in the Eurovision Song Contest 2012

=== Sports ===
- 27 July–12 August: at the 2012 Summer Olympics in London, Norway won a total of four Olympic medals including two gold medals. Eirik Verås Larsen won the gold medal in canoeing, men's K-1 1000 metres, and the Norwegian team won the women's handball tournament.
- 1–9 August: the 55th Aeronautical pentathlon World Championships are held in Trondheim

=== Literature ===
- The novel Olavs draumar by Jon Fosse is published. In 2015, Fosse was awarded the Nordic Council Literature Prize, for Andvake (2007), Olavs draumar and Kveldsvævd (2014).
- Merethe Lindstrøm is awarded the Nordic Council Literature Prize, for Days in the History of Silence.

== Anniversaries ==
- 1 June – 100 years since Hans Dons became the first Norwegian to fly in Norway
- 21 August – 125 years since the Labour Party was established
- 21 September – 100 years since the first flight at Kjeller Airport
- October – 50 years since the first of the popular Stompa movies, Stompa & Co., premiered.
- 12 December – 100 years since the birth of Thorbjørn Egner
- 21 December – 50 years since Norway's first national park, Rondane National Park, was established
- 100 years since Kristine Bonnevie became the first female professor in Norway
- 50 years since the Goethe-Institut first established itself in Norway.
- 250 years since the establishment of Hadeland Glassverk.

== Notable deaths ==
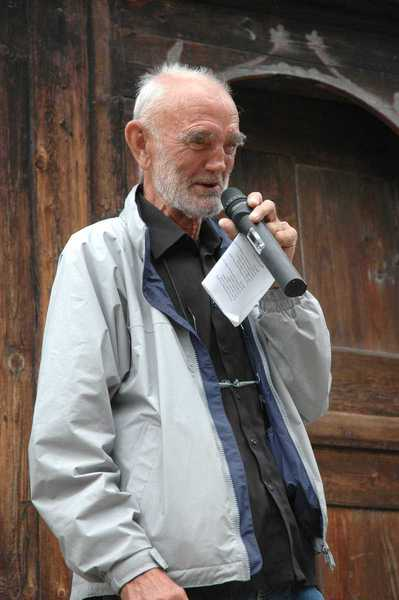
Odd Børretzen

- 2 January – Liv Godin, missionary (b. 1918)
- 2 January – Ambjørg Sælthun, politician (b. 1922)
- 4 January – Totti Bergh, jazz saxophonist (b. 1935)
- 7 January – Dag Heyerdahl Larsen, translator (b. 1965)
- 11 January – Christoffer Selbekk, ski jumper and businessman (b. 1939)
- 12 January – Bjørn G. Andersen, geologist (b. 1924)
- 13 January – Anton Blom, journalist (b. 1924)
- 13 January – Ivar Furu, politician (b. 1928)
- 14 January – Lasse Kolstad, actor (b. 1922)
- 17 January – Tom Tellefsen, actor (b. 1931)
- 18 January – Are Frode Søholt, poet (b. 1974)
- 21 January – Julie Skjæraasen, professor of medicine (b. 1928)
- 23 January – Arne Christiansen, Supreme Court justice (b. 1926)
- 24 January – Arild Haaland, philosopher (b. 1919)
- 25 January – Stig Sæterbakken, writer (b. 1966)
- 30 January – Johannes Ulltveit-Moe, civil servant (b. 1941)
- 31 January – Anders Askildsen Eikås, drummer (b. 1992)
- 1 February – Ingolf Mork, ski jumper (b. 1947)
- 2 February – Leif Hugo Olsson, footballer (b. 1927)
- 6 February – Aage Johansen, speed skater (b. 1919)
- 6 February – Knut Tveit, educationalist (b. 1939)
- 11 February – Siri Bjerke, politician (b. 1958)
- 13 February – Paul Otto Johnsen, politician (b. 1924)
- 13 February – Nils Grinde, musicologist and theatre historian (b. 1927)
- 15 February – Jan Svenneby, chess player (b. 1936)
- 16 February – Ronald Rindestu, politician (b. 1942)
- 16 February – Reidar T. Larsen, politician (b. 1923)
- 18 February – Roald Aas, speed skater (b. 1928)
- 20 February – Knut Thorbjørn Eggen, football manager (b. 1960)
- 20 February – Kjell Thue, radio presenter (b. 1919)
- 20 February – Christoffer Schander, biologist (b. 1960)
- 21 February – Andreas Lunnan, radio and television presenter (b. 1940)
- 22 February – Eivin One Pedersen, jazz pianist and accordionist (b. 1956)
- 26 February – Johannes Vågsnes, politician (b. 1923)
- 3 March – Per J. Husabø, politician (b. 1928)
- 8 March – Kristin Bølgen Bronebakk, civil servant (b. 1950)
- 11 March – Kjell Karlsen, odontologist (b. 1921)
- 12 March – Johnny Myrseth, furniture industrialist (b. 1925)
- 13 March – Grete Nordrå, actress (b. 1924)
- 15 March – Edvard Hagerup Bull, composer (b. 1922)
- 19 March – Hugo Munthe-Kaas, officer and politician (b. 1922)
- 19 March – Knut Erik Tranøy, philosopher (b. 1918)
- 21 March – Kåre Tveter, painter (b. 1922)
- 29 March – Liv Buck, trade unionist (b. 1928)
- 4 April – Helge Sverre Nesheim, television presenter (b. 1919)
- 4 April – Anne Karin Elstad, novelist (b. 1938)
- 8 April – Aage Grundstad, accordionist (b. 1923)
- 9 April – Harald Gullichsen, translator (b. 1920)
- 10 April – Odd Rikard Olsen, politician and editor (b. 1947)
- 10 April – Svein Aasmundstad, civil servant (b. 1947)
- 13 April – Inge Bråten, skiing coach (b. 1948)
- 14 April – Per G. Stavnum, diplomat (b. 1941)
- 15 April – Birger Lambertz-Nilssen, architect (b. 1941)
- 18 April – Åge Storhaug, gymnast (b. 1938)
- 18 April – Kristian Lund, politician (b. 1932)
- 24 April – Thomas Chr. Wyller, political scientist (b. 1922)
- 26 April – Astrid Dahlsveen, sculptor (b. 1929)
- 28 April – Stein Johnson, athlete and coach (b. 1921)
- 28 April – Harald Bergseth, soil scientist (b. 1923)
- 29 April – Idar Ulstein, businessperson (b. 1934)
- 29 April – Odd Henning Grønmo, politician (b. 1922)
- 30 April – Finn Benestad, musicologist (b. 1929)
- 1 May – Alexander Dale Oen, swimmer (b. 1985, died in the US)
- 1 May – Siri Myrvoll, archeologist and politician (b. 1944)
- 2 May – Karsten Ekorness, Christian singer (b. 1917)
- 4 May – Anne Breivik, artist (b. 1932)
- 6 May – Kåre Øistein Hansen, politician (b. 1927)
- 6 May – Arne Berg, architectural historian (b. 1917)
- 8 May – Ingvill Elsebe Raaum, politician (b. 1935)
- 9 May – Gunnar Dybwad, footballer (b. 1928)
- 9 May – Ingvald M. Smith-Kielland, royal servant (b. 1919)
- 10 May – Gunnar Sønsteby, resistance fighter (b. 1918)
- 12 May – Tor Marius Gromstad, footballer (b. 1989) – body found on 14 May
- 13 May – Trond Bråthen, black metal musician (b. 1977)
- 13 May – Paul Engstad, politician and writer (b. 1936)
- 17 May – Jon Istad, biathlete and sport shooter (b. 1937)
- 17 May – Harald Synnes, politician (b. 1931)
- 18 May – Ottar Starheim, journalist (b. 1946)
- 20 May – Svenn Stray, politician (b. 1922)
- 20 May – Nils Jernsletten, philologist (b. 1934)
- 21 May – Andreas Arntzen, barrister (b. 1928)
- 29 May – Ola O. Røssum, politician (b. 1926)
- 3 June – Bengt Wilson, food photographer (b. 1945)
- 4 June – Ljubiša Rajić, professor of Norwegian language (b. 1947, died in Serbia)
- 4 June – Per Sunderland, actor (b. 1924)
- 8 June – Johan Kjelsberg, actor (b. 1931)
- 10 June – Eivind Bolle, politician (b. 1923)
- 10 June – Arnfinn Haram, monk and writer (b. 1948)
- 10 June – Gunnar Rogstad, diplomat (b. 1916)
- 12 June – Ervin Løffler, sculptor (b. 1922)
- 15 June – Carl Julius Norstrøm, economist (b. 1936)
- 20 June – Øivind Iversen, furniture designer (b. 1928)
- 21 June – Viggo Johannessen, civil servant (b. 1936)
- 23 June – Arne Wegner Haaland, engineer (b. 1923)
- 25 June – Kjell Sørensen, sport shooter (b. 1930)
- 26 June – Harry W. Kvebæk, trumpeter (b. 1936)
- 27 June – Rolf Lindemann, physician (b. 1942)
- 28 June – Mikal Kirkholt, cross-country skier (b. 1920)
- 28 June – Gunnar Eide, impresario (b. 1920)
- 1 July – Odd Todnem, engineer (b. 1922)
- 2 July – Ingebjørg Vaale, politician (b. 1916)
- 2 July – Lisbet Dæhlin, ceramicist (b. 1922)
- 11 July – Bjørn Blakstad, diplomat (b. 1926)
- 2 July – Lisbet Dæhlin, ceramist (died 1922)
- 12 July – Alf Haugland, poet (b. 1924)
- 12 July – Arne Henry Jensen, politician (b. 1927)
- 13 July – Rolf Nilssen, politician (b. 1928)
- 20 July – Hanne Marthe Narud, political scientist (b. 1958)
- 22 July – Håkon Randal, politician (b. 1930)
- 26 July – Rita Drangsholt Christiansen, singer (b. 1917)
- 31 July – Marie Brenden, politician (b. 1938)
- 31 July – Bjørn-Eivind Siem Slettedal, businessperson (b. 1952)
- 2 August – Hans Gabriel Finne, architect (b. 1916)
- 3 August – Odd Isaksen, trade unionist (b. 1924)
- 4 August – Sigrid Schjetne, murder victim (b. 1996)
- 7 August – Hans Hammond Rossbach, politician (b. 1931)
- 8 August – Sverre Halvorsen, professor of medicine (b. 1925)
- 14 August – Svein Hansen, ice hockey player (b. 1943)
- 16 August – Turid Kjellmann Pedersen, politician (b. 1937)
- 16 August – Aase Bjerkholt, politician (b. 1915)
- 18 August – Eilif Straume, television presenter (b. 1928)
- 18 August – Ansten Samuelstuen, ski jumper (b. 1929, died in the US)
- 18 August – Ivar Svare, physicist (b. 1931)
- 19 August – Arne Christiansen, theatre director (b. 1924)
- 19 August – Ivar Iversen, canoer (b. 1914)
- 26 August – Karsten Anker Solhaug, Salvationist (b. 1914)
- 29 August – Grete Lein Lange, textile artist (b. 1926)
- 30 August – Vidar Theisen, weather presenter (b. 1933)
- 30 August – Anton Skulberg, veterinarian and politician (b. 1921)
- 30 August – Kristian Fougner, resistance member (b. 1919)
- 31 August – Enok Palm, mathematician (b. 1924)
- 1 September – Rolf Bjørn Backe, footballer (b. 1934)
- 1 September – Jon Tolaas, poet (b. 1939)
- 5 September – Tore Rasch, handball coach (b. 1935)
- 9 September – Målfrid Longva, politician (b. 1925)
- 9 September – Unni Sæther, athlete (b. 1932)
- 10 September – Sissel Calmeyer, textile artist (b. 1941)
- 11 September – Finn Bergesen, business leader (b. 1945)
- 11 September – Tomas Evjen, film producer (b. 1972)
- 12 September – Alfred Henningsen, politician (b. 1918)
- 13 September – Tor Gundersen, ice hockey player (b. 1935)
- 14 September – Odd Roar Lofterød, yacht racer (b. 1947)
- 16 September – Princess Ragnhild, Mrs. Lorentzen, princess (b. 1930)
- 22 September – Helge Barstad, judge and politician (b. 1928)
- 29 September – Knut Sydsæter, economist (b. 1937)
- 2 October – Kaare Ørnung, pianist (b. 1931)
- 2 October – Konrad B. Knutsen, civil servant (b. 1925)
- 8 October – Hans Kristian Seip, forester (b. 1920)
- 9 October – Bernt Stangholm, diplomat (b. 1920)
- 12 October – Jorun Askersrud Nygaard, athlete (b. 1929)
- 13 October – Rolf Auke, evangelist (b. 1948)
- 17 October – Karin Stoltenberg, geneticist (b. 1931).
- 19 October – Eva Nordland, educator (b. 1921)
- 20 October – Harald Eidheim, social anthropologist (b. 1925)
- 21 October – Sverre Cornelius Lund, accordionist (b. 1931)
- 3 November – Odd Børretzen, writer and musician (b. 1926)
- 3 November – Anne-Lise Berntsen, opera singer (b. 1943)
- 4 November – Marit Henie Moe, figure skater (b. 1925)
- 5 November – Morten Ræder, surgeon (b. 1939)
- 5 November – Bjørn Pedersen, resistance member (b. 1939)
- 10 November – Birger Strømsheim, resistance member (b. 1911)
- 10 November – Karl Georg Høyer, environmentalist (b. 1946)
- 11 November – Kjellaug Pettersen, women's rights activist (b. 1934)
- 15 November – Frode Thingnæs, jazz trombonist (b. 1940)
- 15 November – Kari Blom, rector (b. 1934)
- 18 November – Otto Hauglin, politician (b. 1942)
- 21 November – Stein Schjærven, marketer (b. 1934)
- 24 November – Arne Porsum, sports journalist (b. 1930)
- 26 November – Per Tveit, musician (b. 1951)
- 26 November – Ola Emil Sprakehaug, Pentecostal leader (b. 1951)
- 25 November – Bjørn Winsnes, photographer (b. 1925)
- 26 November – Hans Jørgen Walle-Hansen, businessman (b. 1912)
- 27 November – Bjørn Østring, national socialist (b. 1917)
- 2 December – Gitte Dæhlin, artist (b. 1956)
- 6 December – Reginald Norby, diplomat (b. 1934)
- 9 December – Håkon E. Andersen, bishop (b. 1925)
- 12 December – Per Jacobsen, footballer (b. 1924)
- 12 December – Else Marie Jakobsen, artist (b. 1927)
- 18 December – Kari Lihus, speed skater (b. 1935)
- 21 December – Harald Ohrvik, film producer (b. 1940)
- 22 December – Peter Anker, art historian (b. 1922)
- 23 December – Fredrik Thoresen, businessperson (b. 1926)
- 25 December – Birger Tingstad, footballer (b. 1939)
- 25 December – Halfdan Hegtun, politician (b. 1918)
- 27 December – Ivar Ytreland, politician (b. 1926)
- 30 December – Christian Hallén-Paulsen, luger (b. 1945)

== See also ==
- 2012 in Norwegian music
