= Theisen =

Theisen is a surname. Notable people with the surname include:

- Brianne Theisen (born 1988), Canadian heptathlete and women's pentathlete
- Christopher Theisen (born 1993), German footballer
- Dave Theisen (1941–2014), American football player
- Jerome Theisen (1930–1995), American Benedictine monk
- Joseph M. Theisen (1877–1946), American politician
- Mary Theisen-Lappen (born 1990), American weightlifter
- Matthias Theisen (1833–1923), American politician
- Oscar Theisen (1897–?), Luxembourgish wrestler
- Paul Theisen (born 1922), Danish fencer
- Rasmus Theisen (1837–1908), Norwegian civil servant and politician
- Roger Theisen (1932–2024), Luxembourgian fencer
- Vidar Theisen (1933–2012), Norwegian meteorologist
- William Theisen, American restauranteur

== See also ==
- Theisen's, American retail company
