= Haaland (disambiguation) =

Erling Haaland (born 2000) is a Norwegian footballer.

Haaland may also refer to:

== Sports ==
=== Football ===
- Alf-Inge Haaland (born 1972), Norwegian footballer, father of Erling
- Atle Roar Håland (born 1977), Norwegian footballer
- Benedicte Håland (born 1998), Norwegian footballer
- Markus Haaland (born 2005), Norwegian footballer
- Stig Krohn Haaland (born 1975), Norwegian footballer and manager
- Susanne Haaland (born 1998), Norwegian footballer

=== Sailing ===
- Thom Haaland (born 1967), Norwegian sailor

=== Skiing ===
- Lars Haaland (born 1962), Swedish cross-country skier

== Politicians ==
- Christian Wegner Haaland (1892–1952), Norwegian ship-owner and politician
- Deb Haaland (born 1960), American politician
- Thomas Vigner Christiansen Haaland (1859–1913), Norwegian banker, politician
- Thomas Wegner Larsen Haaland (1862–1935), Norwegian banker, politician, farmer

== Other ==
- Arne Haaland (1936–2023), Norwegian chemist
- Arne Wegner Haaland (1923–2012), Norwegian engineer
- Bjøro Håland (born 1943), Norwegian country singer
- Bret Haaland (born 1964), American animation director
- Gordon A. Haaland (1940–2017), American academic
- Jan Haaland (born 1956), Norwegian School of Economics and Business Administration rector
- Janne Haaland Matláry (born 1957), Norwegian professor for political science and author
- Karine Haaland (born 1966), Norwegian cartoonist
- Reidar Haaland (1919–1945), Norwegian police officer executed for treason
- Turid Haaland (1908–1979), Norwegian actress

== See also ==
- Haaland v. Brackeen, US Supreme Court case
- Halland
