= Myrseth =

Myrseth is a surname. Notable people with the surname include:

- Bjørn Myrseth (born 1944), Norwegian businessman
- Cecilie Myrseth (born 1984), Norwegian psychologist and politician
- Jan Otto Myrseth (born 1957), Norwegian Lutheran bishop
- Johnny Myrseth (1925–2012), Norwegian businessman and politician
