= Lørdagsbarnetimen =

Norwegian children's radio programme

Lørdagsbarnetimen ("The Saturday Children's Hour") was a children's radio programme produced by the Norwegian Broadcasting Corporation (NRK) and broadcast every Saturday from 20 December 1924 until 11 September 2010 with a forced interruption during World War II. By the time of its final broadcast it had become the world's longest-running regular weekly radio series.

== History ==
=== 1924–1940 ===
The first "Lørdagsbarnetimen", then under the name "Barnetimen", aired on 20 December 1924, broadcast by the private Kringkastingsselskapet A/S. The host was Carl Bødtker ("Uncle Bødtker")

From the beginning, the program was defined as "pure entertainment, a rest and encouragement after finishing school". The program should not be educational.

"Barnetimen" was in several ways innovative for the radio form in Norway. The first radio dramas were broadcast here, and there were debates between the participants at a time when the license conditions prohibited political content and made similar forms of program irrelevant for adults. The participants were often children, and also had a much more informal and improvisational style than in adult verbal programs, which were most often lectures.

Einar Schibbye was the host in the years before the Second World War, known as "Uncle Einar". The stories about Uncle Einar, Oscar and Spisskammeret, or the meetings between Uncle Einar, Kallemann, Amandus and Aunt Amalie (the last characters had been created in collaboration with Sverres Erichsen in Schibbye's NRK period in Bergen) became institutions on the radio.

Schibbye's imagination took the children on adventures with the most incredible plots, often with a certain technological touch. With his personal leadership, regular features and numerous unconventional sets to activate the listeners, Schibbye made Barnetimen a forerunner of the magazine programs in the 1960s.

=== 1945–1999 ===
The first years after the war were characterized by a shortage of resources. Barnetimen was first designed as a family program, which the head of NRK's newly established children and youth department Lauritz Johnson from 1946 immediately took up and turned into a children's program. He took over as leader of Barnetimen, which then had airtime at 18 o'clock. As the program manager for Barnetimen, he eventually became known as the whole of Norway's "Uncle Lauritz". He made sure to build up the department with its own choir, orchestra and weekly radio drama. Sonni Holtedahl Larsen became «Aunt Sonni».

The lyric of the legendary theme song "Now comes the children's hour (hush, hush, hush, be quiet as a mouse)" was written by the artist, author and songwriter Thorbjørn Egner in 1950. The melody is "The Shoemaker Boy" (Skomagerdrengen), composed by Eric Christiansen and Vilfred Kjær for the first Danish all-night cartoon Fyrtøjet, in 1946. The theme song was re-recorded in 1992 with the Broadcasting Orchestra and the Silver Boys choir in an arrangement by the composer Rolf Wallin.

The program item "Barnetimeboka" (Children's hours book) was an author relay in which an author wrote the first chapter of a story to which the listeners then submitted text suggestions for new chapters, often together with drawings. All contributions were awarded, and the result of the best contributions came in book form, where part of the profit from book sales went to a good cause that the children had voted for. One of the books, Toya, was filmed with the then popular child star Magne Ove «Spurven» Larsen in the role of Trygve. In 2003, "Barnetimeboka" had its 50th anniversary.

Among the hosts after Lauritz Johnson and Sonni Holtedahl Larsen are Helge Sverre Nesheim, Ragnhild Knagenhjelm, Ingrid Boman, Knut Røe, Frank Nordli and Jon Roar Tønnesen (permanent technician and co-host), Svein Tore Andersen, Frank Tangen, Arnfinn Christensen (permanent technician and co-creators), Jon Henriksen, Birgitte Gjestvang, Hege Omre, Webjørn S. Espeland, Vera Michaelsen and Marianne Furevold.

The age difference between large and small children meant that "Barnetimen" for the little ones, which originally began in 1947 as "inspiration for today's play", also had its own reading series for small children with Thorbjørn Egner from 1951.

In 1953, 94% of Norway's children listened to Lørdagsbarnetimen.

=== 2000–2010 ===
The program was still very popular in the 2000s, with an average of 331,000 listeners every Saturday in the first four months of 2009. But only eight percent of the target group, who were children between three and eleven years old, listened to the "Saturday children's hour". Nine out of ten listeners were adults, as many as 80% of the listeners were 45 years or older, and half were over 60 years old.

NRK never marked that "Barnetimen" was closed down. The closure was referred to as "program reorganization", and the last program went on the air on September 11, 2010.
