= Peter J. Hammond (economist) =

American economist (born 1945)

Peter Hammond FBA
- Born: 9 May 1945 (age 81)

Academic background
- Education: Trinity Hall, Cambridge
- Doctoral advisor: James Mirrlees

Academic work
- Discipline: Economic theory
- Institutions: Stanford University

Peter Jackson Hammond (born 9 May 1945) is a professor of economics and a Research Associate for CAGE (Centre for Competitive Advantage in the Global Economy) at the University of Warwick. In the past he has also worked as the Marie Curie Professor of Economic Theory at the University of Warwick and an emeritus Professor of Economics at Stanford University. He has made numerous significant contributions to the advancement of Economic Theory.

== Education ==
His undergraduate study was in Mathematics at the University of Cambridge (Trinity Hall) from 1964 to 1967. He continued at Cambridge as a Research Student in Economics at the Faculty of Economics and Politics (1967–1969) and went on to earn a PhD in Economics there in 1974.

== Career ==
During his career, he has held numerous positions, he was a professor of economics at Stanford University from 1979 to 2007 (Emeritus from April 2007). He has held positions at the London School of Economics, Nuffield College, Oxford, Princeton University, the University of Essex, Australian National University, University of Bonn, University of Bristol, University of Kiel, the National University of Singapore and the Hebrew University of Jerusalem to name some.

== Honours and awards ==
He has been the recipient of various honours and awards. He was elected to a fellowship of the Econometric Society in 1977 and held a Guggenheim Fellowship from 1987 to 1988. He is also a Fellow of the British Academy.

He was awarded Honorary Doctorates in Economics and Social Sciences from the University of Kiel and in Philosophy from the University of Oslo.

== Selected bibliography ==
=== Books ===
- Hammond, Peter J.; Seidl, Christian; Barbera, Salvador (1998). Handbook of utility theory. Dordrecht Boston: Kluwer Academic Publishers. ISBN 9780792381747.
- Hammond, Peter J.; Sydsæter, Knut (2008). Essential mathematics for economic analysis. Harlow: FT Prentice Hall. ISBN 9780273713241.

=== Chapters in books ===
- Hammond, Peter J. (1982), "Utilitarianism, uncertainty and information", in Sen, Amartya; Williams, Bernard (eds.), Utilitarianism and beyond, Cambridge: Cambridge University Press, pp. 85–102, ISBN 9780511611964.
- Hammond, Peter J. (2009), "Isolation, assurance and rules: can rational folly supplant foolish rationality?", in Kanbur, Ravi; Basu, Kaushik (eds.), Arguments for a better world: essays in honor of Amartya Sen | Volume I: Ethics, welfare, and measurement, Oxford New York: Oxford University Press, pp. 523–534, ISBN 9780199239115
