= Grete Lein Lange =

Norwegian textile artist

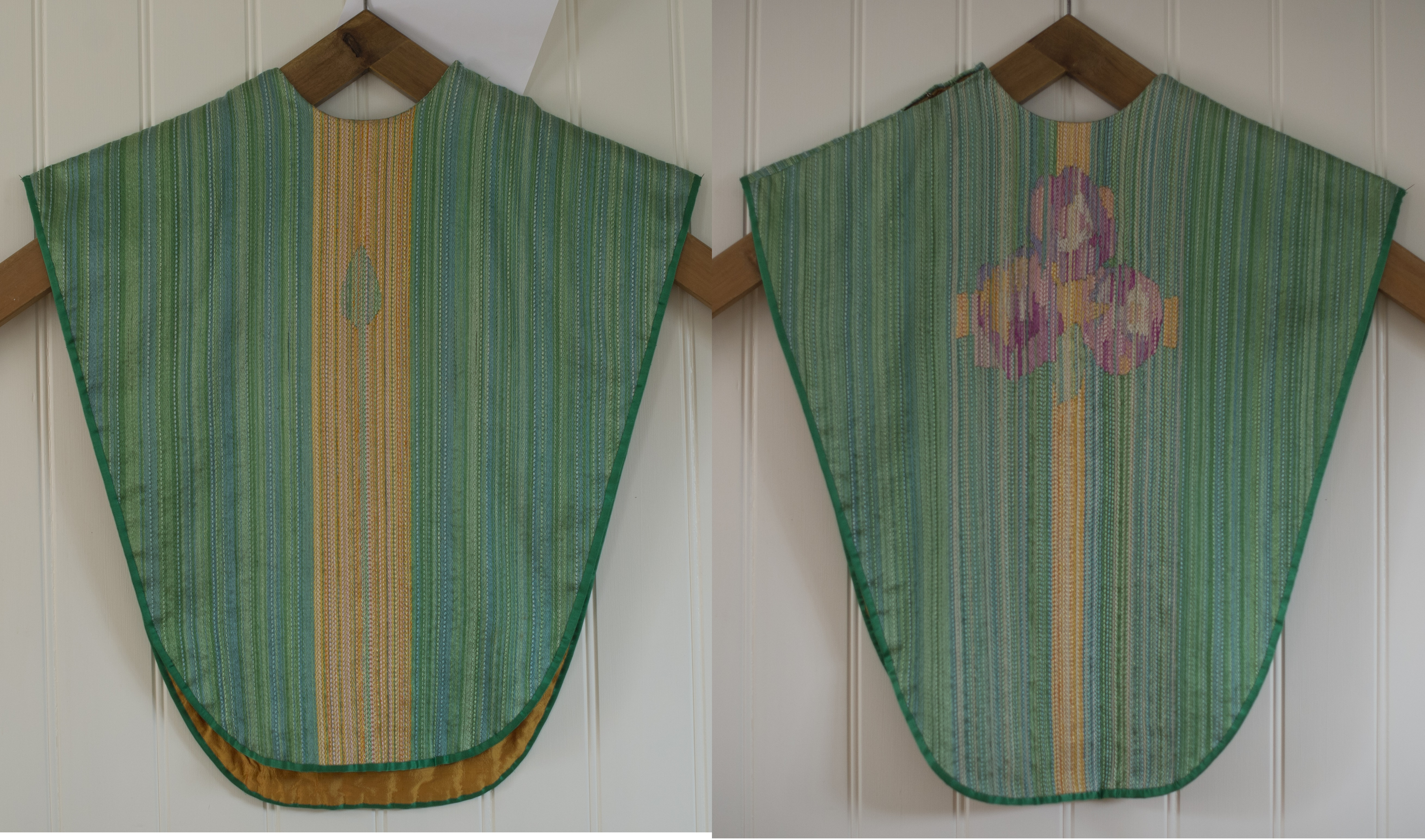
Chasuble made for Nidaros Cathedral in 1986.

Grete Johanne Lein Lange (2 September 1926 – 29 August 2012) was a Norwegian textile artist, mainly known for church textiles.

Born Grete Johanne Lein in Oslo, she married Bernt Christopher Lange. She finished her secondary education at Kristelig Gymnasium. Between 1948 and 1958 she attended the Norwegian National Academy of Craft and Art Industry, Statens kvinnelige industriskole and the Norwegian National Academy of Fine Arts.

She later taught at the two former schools, and was also contracted as a clothing designer for Seiersborg Tekstilfabrik and Gudbrandsdalens Uldvarefabrik. She kept a workshop in Fredrikstad from 1959 before moving to Lunner in 1964. She resided with her family at Fjell farm at Bjørgeseter. Designing for the Evangelical-Lutheran Church, she was devoutly religious herself.

The church textiles she produced included chasubles, antependiums for both pulpits and altars, and tapestries. By the 1980s her textiles were found in at least 33 churches and chapels in Norway, ranging from Svalbard Church in the far north, Haakonsvern Chapel in the west and Halden in the south-east, and including the diocesan churches Oslo Cathedral, Hamar Cathedral and Nidaros Cathedral. Her body of work reached about 100 pieces in about 50 churches. She also took part in exhibitions at Maihaugen in 1968, Paris in 1958 and Germany in 1963.

She was an honorary member of Norske Brukskunstnere. She died at Lunner Nursing Home in August 2012.
