= Murder of Martine Vik Magnussen =

Murder victim

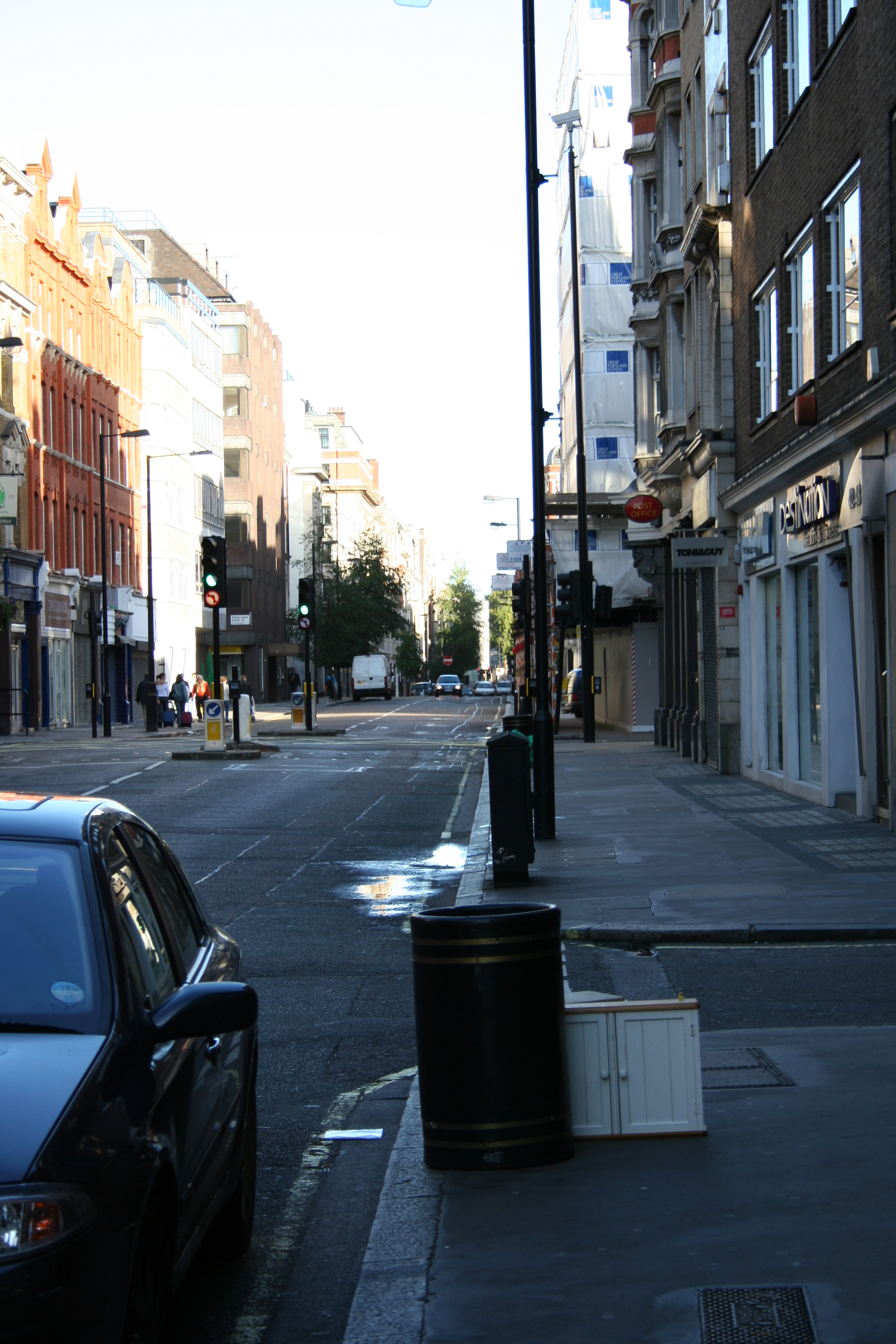
- Great Portland Street, where Magnussen's body was found in a block of flats.
- Date: 14 March 2008
- Location: Great Portland Street, Marylebone, London

Martine Vik Magnussen, a 23-year-old Norwegian student, was raped and murdered in London on 14 March 2008. She had been celebrating end-of-term exams with friends at a Mayfair nightclub and left with fellow-student Farouk Abdulhak to continue partying. Her body was found two days later in the basement of the block of flats in Great Portland Street where Abdulhak lived. In the meantime, Abdulhak, the son of one of Yemen's wealthiest men, had fled the country. He remains the only suspect but, since the UK does not have an extradition treaty with Yemen, has not been brought to trial.

== Murder and investigation ==
On the evening of Thursday 13 March 2008, 23-year-old Martine Vik Magnussen was celebrating end-of-term exams with friends from Regent's Business School at the Maddox nightclub in Mayfair. She was last seen leaving the nightclub with fellow-student, Farouk Abdulhak, at 3:20 am, with the intention of continuing to party at his flat. When she had not returned home on Saturday morning, her flatmates contacted police and a missing person inquiry was launched. On Sunday morning, officers searched Abdulhak's flat in Great Portland Street and found an item of Magnussen's clothing. Suspicions aroused, they proceeded to break down a basement door and found Magnussen's body under a pile of rubble. She had been raped and either strangled or smothered. Her body was missing her jeans, her shoes, a Guess watch, and a pair of Christian Dior earrings. Her Marc Jacobs handbag was also missing. Police published photographs of the missing items in an attempt to trace them. By the time Magnussen was reported missing, her suspected killer had fled the country, flying first to Cairo and then boarding his father's private jet to fly to Yemen.

Abdulhak was formally named as a suspect in the rape and murder of Magnussen in July 2008. The police said that a file had been passed to the Crown Prosecution Service and the government of Yemen had been contacted as, although there was no treaty between the UK and Yemen, it was on occasion possible to make a request for extradition. The Crown Prosecution Service decided there was enough evidence to charge Abdulhak with rape and murder and a European arrest warrant was issued.

An inquest held at Westminster Coroner's Court in November 2010 recorded a verdict of unlawful killing. A forensic pathologist told the court that Magnussen, who had drunk alcohol and taken cocaine, had injuries consistent with having tried to fight off her attacker. Her death had been due to "compression of the neck", as a result either of strangulation or smothering. Following the inquest, Magnussen's father praised the police for the way they had conducted the investigation, appealed to Abdulhak to give himself up, and expressed his hope that in the future cross border crime could be resolved politically.

The case remained live, in spite of the failure of diplomatic efforts to extradite Abdulhak. On the sixth and eighth anniversaries of the murder, the Metropolitan Police appealed through Facebook to people in Yemen to encourage the suspect to return to the UK to face trial. There were further appeals on subsequent anniversaries. In March 2025, a Metropolitan Police inspector addressed an appeal to Adbulhak, saying: "You have been running and hiding for 17 years.... It is time to grow up and face your responsibilities to Martine and her family."

In March 2022, an unnamed woman in her 60s was arrested on suspicion of assisting an offender in the case.

== Suspect ==
Farouk Abdulhak, the only suspect in the case, is the son of the late Shaher Abdulhak, a Yemeni billionaire businessman based in Cairo, and Syrian-American Rowayda Michael Besher. Shaher Abdulhak had powerful connections in Yemen and was a close friend of President Ali Abdullah Saleh. Brought up in Egypt and the United States, Abdulhak attended international schools and then studied at Regent's Business School in London, where he met Magnussen. Since fleeing to Yemen in the hours after the murder in 2008, Abdulhak is believed to have been living at family homes in the cities of Sanaa and Taiz. He married in Yemen, had a child and divorced, becoming isolated after his ex-wife and child, and other family members, fled the civil war in Yemen. In 2022, Abdulhak was contacted by a BBC journalist, Nawal Al-Maghafi, and, via text and voicemail, admitted to involvement in Magnussen's death. He claimed it was "a sex accident gone wrong" and that he could remember little about it as he had taken cocaine. The injuries sustained by Magnussen in defending herself were incompatible with his account.

The release of the Epstein files in January 2026 revealed that, in 2012, Jeffrey Epstein had brokered a meeting between Abdulhak's father and Lord Macdonald, the former Director of Public Prosecutions, who by that time had returned to private practice as a barrister. For a fee of £20,000, Macdonald met with Abdulhak's father in Paris. For a further undisclosed fee, he later flew to Sanaa where he met with both Abdulhak and his father. Macdonald issued a statement in 2026, saying that he had acted professionally and ethically and with the sole purpose of attempting to persuade Abdulhak to return to the UK to face justice. His attempt had been unsuccessful.

== Victim ==
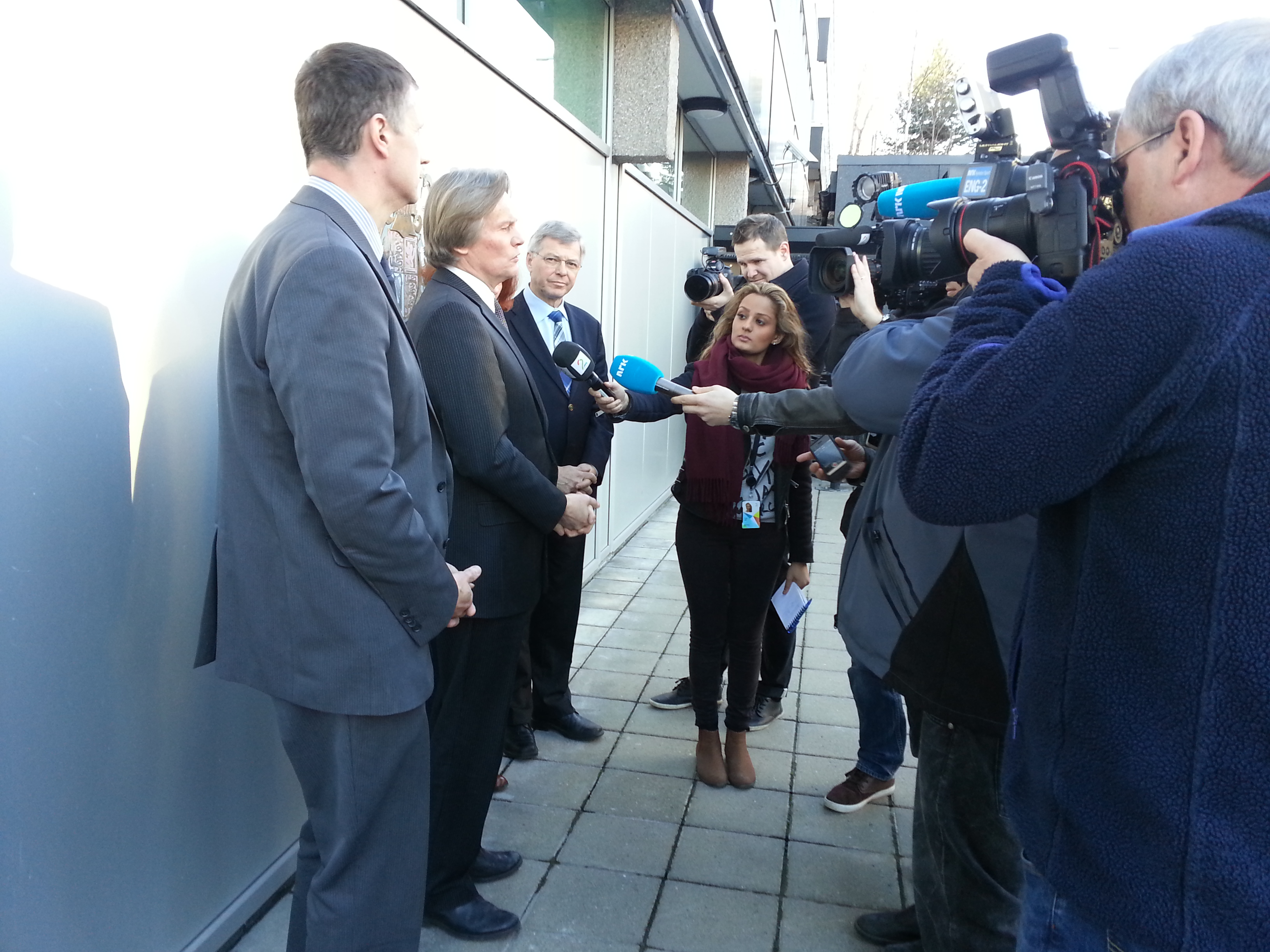
The father of Martine Vik Magnussen speaking to the press

Martine Vik Magnussen was born in Nesøya, in Asker, Norway. She attended a private school, the Kristelig Gymnasium, in Oslo. After leaving school in 2004, she worked for various fashion stores in Oslo, including Massimo Dutti. In 2006, she started a course in medicine in Poland but left after six months. She moved to London in February 2007 and, that autumn, enrolled in Regent's Business School, where Abdulhak was also a student.

Magnussen's funeral took place at Asker Church on 30 April 2008. On 1 December 2009, hundreds of people joined Magnussen's family in a torchlit procession in Oslo ending at the Foreign Ministry. A spokesperson for the family said that, although they were satisfied with the efforts being made by the Metropolitan Police and British authorities to bring her killer to justice, they were appealing to the Norwegian authorities to do more to put pressure on the Yemeni authorities. After a pre-inquest hearing on 10 February 2010, students at Regent's Business School attended a torchlit vigil in Regent's Park, together with Magnussen's father, and the college principal and chaplain. Magnussen's family returned to Regent's College in June 2010 to host a remembrance event and unveil a tree planted in Magnussen's memory. At the event, Magnussen's father said that he was campaigning for a change in the law that would introduce arrest regulations to prevent "the possibility of using the lack of extradition from a native country to get away with a crime".

Since the murder of their daughter, Magnussen's parents, Odd Petter Magnussen and Kristina Vik, have campaigned to have Abdulhak brought to justice. Odd Petter Magnussen has played the more prominent part, although Kristina Vik gave an interview to Aftenposten in 2018 in which she appealed to Abdulhak's mother to persuade her son to give himself up.

A Norwegian TV documentary about Magnussen's murder, Jakten på den mistenkte (Hunting the suspect) won its category at the 2010 Gullruten awards. In 2023, BBC Two featured a documentary, Murder in Mayfair about the case.
