= Frank Pingel =

Danish footballer and manager (born 1964)

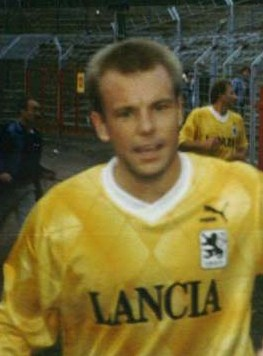
- Pingel at a 1860 Munich match in October 1991.

Personal information
- Full name: Frank Pingel Mortensen
- Date of birth: 9 May 1964 (age 62)
- Place of birth: Vejlby, Denmark
- Height: 1.83 m (6 ft 0 in)
- Position: Forward

Senior career*
Years	Team	Apps	(Gls)
1982–1983	IFH		
1983	Skovbakken		
1984–1988	AGF	30	(11)
1988–1989	Newcastle United	14	(1)
1989–1991	Brøndby	61	(15)
1991–1992	1860 Munich	20	(6)
1992–1993	Brøndby	15	(7)
1993–1994	Bursaspor	27	(12)
1994–1995	Fenerbahçe	3	(1)
1995	Lille	5	(0)

International career
1991–1994	Denmark	11	(5)

Managerial career
- 2000: FC Aarhus
- 2000–2001: Hørning IF
- 2006–2008: AGF (masseur)
- * Club domestic league appearances and goals

Frank Pingel Mortensen (born 9 May 1964) is a Danish former professional footballer and manager, who played as a forward.

== Club career ==
Pingel most notably represented Danish teams AGF and Brøndby, as well as foreign clubs Newcastle United, 1860 Munich, Bursaspor, Fenerbahçe and Lille. While playing for Brøndby IF between 1989 and 1991, as well as the 1992–93 season, he managed to score a total of 30 goals in 93 games, with 22 of these being scored in the Danish league.

== International career ==
Pingel made 11 appearances and scored five goals for the Denmark national team.

== Managerial career ==
In 2000, Pingel briefly coached FC Aarhus just for a few months, being fired after a skirmish with Norwegian player Stig Haaland. Afterwards he coached Danish eighth division club Hørning IF, before returning to his former club AGF as a team masseur. Pingel was sacked from his position on 17 March 2008 after being involved in a quarrel at AGF's training camp in Cyprus.

== Honours ==
=== Player ===
Brøndby

- Danish Football Championship^{1}: 1990, 1991

^{1}: Level 1: 1. Division (1945–1990), Superligaen (1991–present)
