= Helge Sverre Nesheim =

Norwegian radio and television host

Helge Sverre Nesheim (9 December 1919 – 4 April 2012) was a Norwegian radio and television host.

Nesheim was mainly known from the Norwegian Broadcasting Corporation (NRK) children's programs. Around 1960, he was made director of the children and youth department taking over from Lauritz Johnson. Over the years, Nesheim collaborated with a number of children's authors including Alf Prøysen and Anne-Cath. Vestly. He was primarily associated with the children's shows Barnetimen for de minste and Lørdagsbarnetimen. In 1960, he made the first Norwegian children's TV show, Kosekroken. Nesheim wrote, translated and edited a number of children's books and collections of popular songs. He also recorded music, and in 1975 released an album titled Titelitue.
