= Shaher Abdulhak =

Yemeni billionaire businessman (1938–2020)

- Born: 1938; Taiz, Yemen
- Died: 2 October 2020 (aged 81–82); Germany
- Resting place: Cairo, Egypt
- Other name: King of sugar
- Occupation: Businessman
- Children: 4

Shaher Abdulhak (Arabic: شاهر عبد الحق; 1938 – 2 October 2020) was a Yemeni billionaire businessman and founder of Saher Trading. He was one of the wealthiest and most influential businessmen in Yemen.

== Career ==
In 1963 Abdulhak founded the company "Shaher Trading", which grew into a major Yemenian enterprise involved in petroleum, soft drinks, tourism and property. Abdulhak was known as the "King of Sugar" in Yemen, where he held a great deal of political influence. He held bottling and distribution interests for Coca-Cola in several Middle Eastern Countries until Coca-Cola severed ties with him in 2012, following a public boycott campaign.

== Personal life ==
Abdulhak was a personal friend of late president Ali Abdullah Saleh. In spite of his prominent position in Yemeni society, Abdulhak was media-shy; he never granted interviews and no photo of him was ever printed in the local press. On 2 October 2020, Abdulhaq died from cancer in Germany. On 6 October, he was buried in Cairo, Egypt.

=== Murder investigation against his son ===
Farouk Abdulhak, the son of Shaher, is the main murder suspect in the rape and murder of Martine Vik Magnussen in London. Farouk left the UK shortly after her murder and escaped to Yemen with the help of his father's private jet and remains at large. The case has received sustained international attention, and authorities have continued to seek his extradition to the UK to face charges.

Upon the release of the Epstein files in 2026, it was revealed that Epstein tried to assist Abdullhak in getting his son to receive a softer punishment.
