= Gitte Dæhlin =

Norwegian sculptor

Inger Birgitte "Gitte" Dæhlin (21 June 1956 − 2 December 2012) was a Norwegian sculptor, known for her sculptures from textile material.

She was born in Oslo as a daughter of Erik Oddvar and Lisbet Dæhlin. She studied at the Bournemouth and Poole College of Art from 1973 to 1974 and then under Morten Krogh and Bård Breivik at Vestlandets kunstakademi from 1974 to 1977, before residing two years in Mexico. Her works are owned by, among others, the National Gallery of Norway, Arts Council Norway and the Norwegian Museum of Decorative Arts and Design.
