= Bengt Wilson =

Norwegian photographer (1945–2012)

Bengt Emil Wilson (23 June 1945 – 3 June 2012) was a Norwegian food photographer.

Hee grew up in Jevnaker. He started his career as a reprographer for a small printing press in 1963, before taking on an apprenticeship under Bjørn Winsnes. Wilson then founded his own, eponymous photo studio in 1975.

From 1980, he was a photographer for the food magazine Alt om mat, later renamed Mat & drikke. He contributed to the largest weekly magazines in Norway, such as Allers and Kvinner og Klær. By 1993, he had been the photographer for his 85th cookbook, surpassing 100 in 1995 and 130 in 2001. One of the more novel publications was Klar ferdig kokebok, produced between 28 February and 2 March 1995 for a charity project.

Wilson was also a co-owner of restaurants, real estate and a television production company that produced cooking shows. Among others, he was known from Grand Café, which went bankrupt, and for a longer time he was a co-owner of Feinschmecker and Holmenkollen Restaurant. He administered the Norwegian national team of chefs that competed in the Bocuse d'Or.

He resided at Blommenholm. According to Kapital, he was also known for owning luxury and rare cars including a Mercedes-Benz 300 SL, Mercedes-Benz 600 SL, Daimler Limousine, a 1969 Lotus Europa S2 and a 1932 Morris Minor. He died in 2012.
