= Odd Todnem =

Norwegian engineer

Odd Ragnvald Todnem (14 October 1922 – 1 July 2012) was a Norwegian engineer.

He was born in Sandnes. He graduated from the Norwegian Institute of Technology in Trondheim in 1951, but also worked at the Norwegian College of Agriculture at Ås from 1949 to 1957. After three years as a research fellow from 1957 to 1960, he took the dr.ing. degree in 1961. He was a docent in electric power engineering at the Norwegian Institute of Technology, and professor from 1973 to 1993. He was a fellow of the Norwegian Academy of Technological Sciences and received the Médaille d'Honneur from the in 1992. He died in 2012.
