= Målfrid Longva =

Norwegian politician

Målfrid Longva, née Myklebust (20 January 1925 – 9 September 2012) was a Norwegian politician for the Labour Party.

She was born in Vartdal Municipality as a daughter of a fisher. She finished school in Ørskog Municipality in 1944, and later took a domestic science education in Ålesund. She spent her career as a cafe and cafeteria manager in Brattvåg in Haram Municipality.

She started her political career as a member of Haram school board from 1965 to 1971 (later the county school board from 1976 to 1979). She was then a member of the municipal council of Haram Municipality from 1965 to 1967 and 1971 to 1979, and Møre og Romsdal county council from 1975 to 1979.

She served as a deputy representative to the Parliament of Norway from Møre og Romsdal during the terms 1973–1977 and 1977–1981. From January 1978 to October 1979 she met as a regular representative, covering for Asbjørn Jordahl who was a member of Nordli's Cabinet. She was a member of the Standing Committee on Administration.

She was a deputy board chair of Rikstrygdeverket from 1975 to 1979 and Sunnmøre Arbeideravis from 1982 to 1985. She was also active in the cooperative, the Norwegian Red Cross and Noregs Mållag.
