= Eilif Straume =

Norwegian writer and critic

Eilif Straume (2 October 1928 – 18 August 2012) was a Norwegian writer and critic.

He held the cand.philol. degree. He worked as a high school teacher in Eidsvoll and at Stavanger Cathedral School, but is best known from his time in the Norwegian Broadcasting Corporation. He was also a consultant for Fjernsynsteatret and a literary and theatre critic in the newspaper Aftenposten. He issued a poetry collection in 1997, and has been a prolific reader in audiobooks.

He was a member of the Norwegian Academy for Language and Literature, and sat on the committee that awards the Riksmål Society Literature Prize. He has also been a board member of the Norwegian Critics' Association.

He resided in Oslo. He died in August 2012.
