= Theisen's =

Regional retail chain of the United States

Theisen Supply Inc.
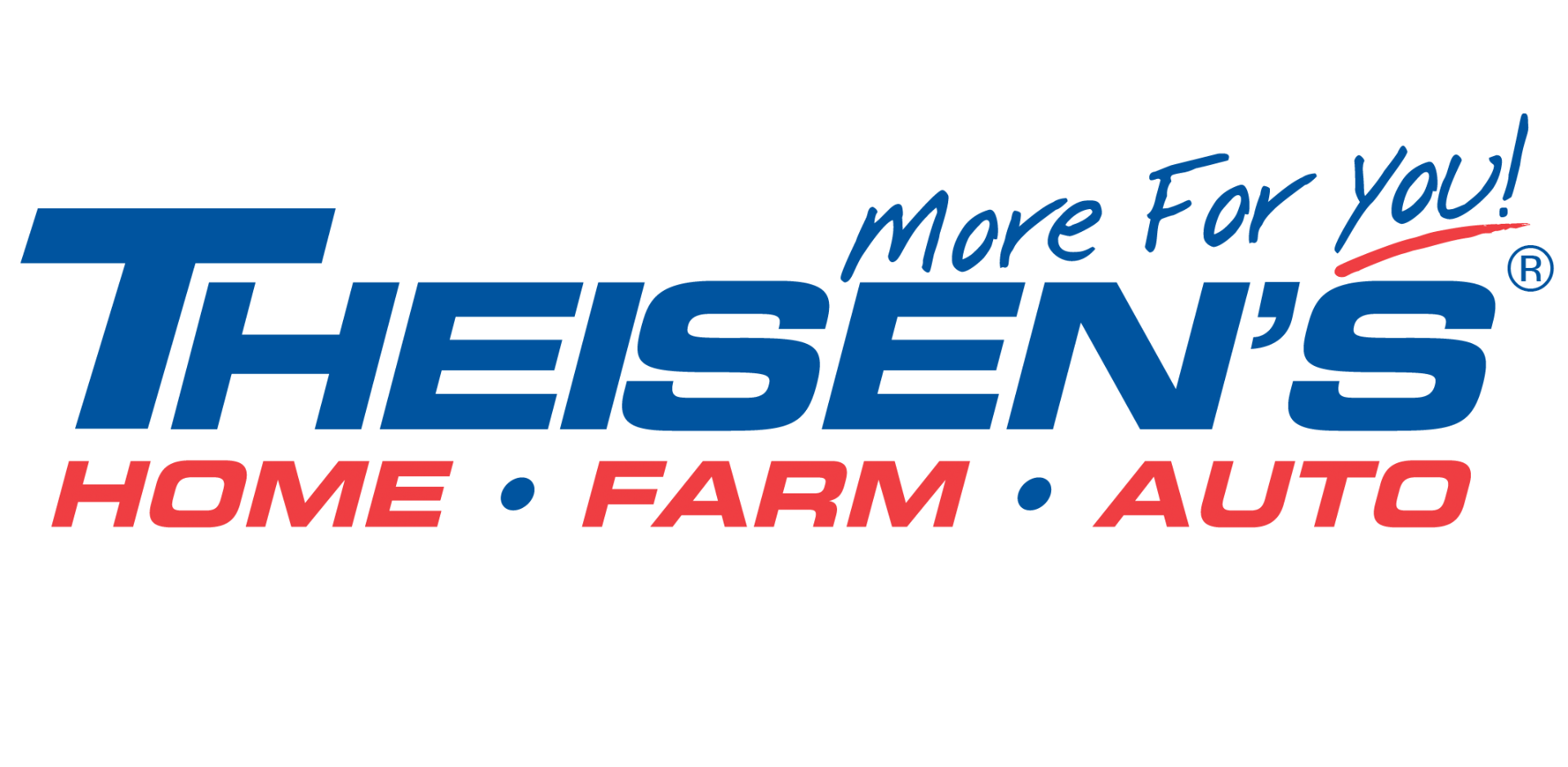

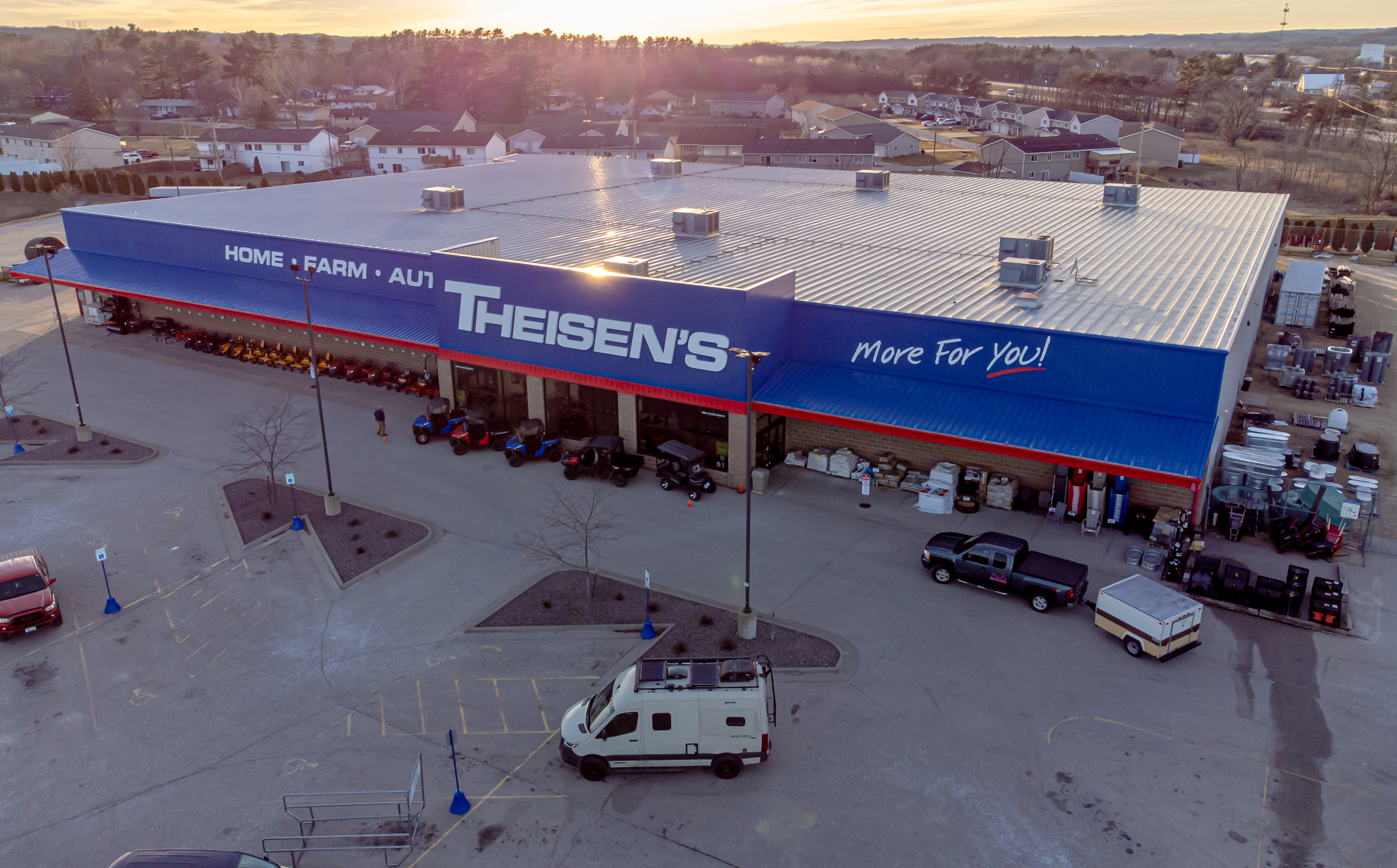
- Theisen's Retail Store in Sparta, Wisconsin
- Trade name: Theisen's
- Type: Private; family business
- Industry: Retail
- Founded: 1927; 99 years ago
- Founders: Leo and Kathryn Theisen
- Headquarters: Dubuque, Iowa, USA
- Number of locations: 26 (2026)
- Key people: Tony Theisen (CEO & President)
- Products: Clothing, footwear, housewares, lawn & garden, farm equipment, automotive, sporting goods, hunting fishing, toys
- Revenue: ▲US$ 254.2 million (2022)
- Owner: Theisen family
- Number of employees: 1,200 (2022)
- Website: Official website

Theisen's is a regional retail chain of 21 stores in Iowa and 5 stores in Wisconsin. The company headquarters are in Dubuque, Iowa. Theisen's stores sell hunting and fishing equipment, home supplies, automotive goods, apparel, footwear, hardware, lawn and garden supplies, paint, pet supplies, sporting goods, farm and ranch supplies, livestock feed, and tools.

== History ==
Initially based in Dubuque with one store, the company opened a second store in Maquoketa, Iowa in 1957. During the 1960s and 1970s the company opened additional stores in Anamosa, Dyersville, Tipton, DeWitt, and Monticello. In 1979 Theisen's left the 8th Street store, moving the retail operation to its current location on Dodge Street (US Route 20). In recent years the company has expanded to new locations, such as Marshalltown, Charles City, Indianola and Cedar Rapids, relocated several stores to larger facilities, and built an addition on to the Dubuque store.

From 1956-2016, Leo A. (Jim) Theisen led the business. Later, Chris Theisen assumed role of President and CEO. On July 1, 2024, Tony Theisen was named President and CEO as Chris Theisen transitioned to Chief Community Officer.
