= Svalbard Church =

Lutheran church in Longyearbyen, Svalbard, Norway

- Svalbard kirke
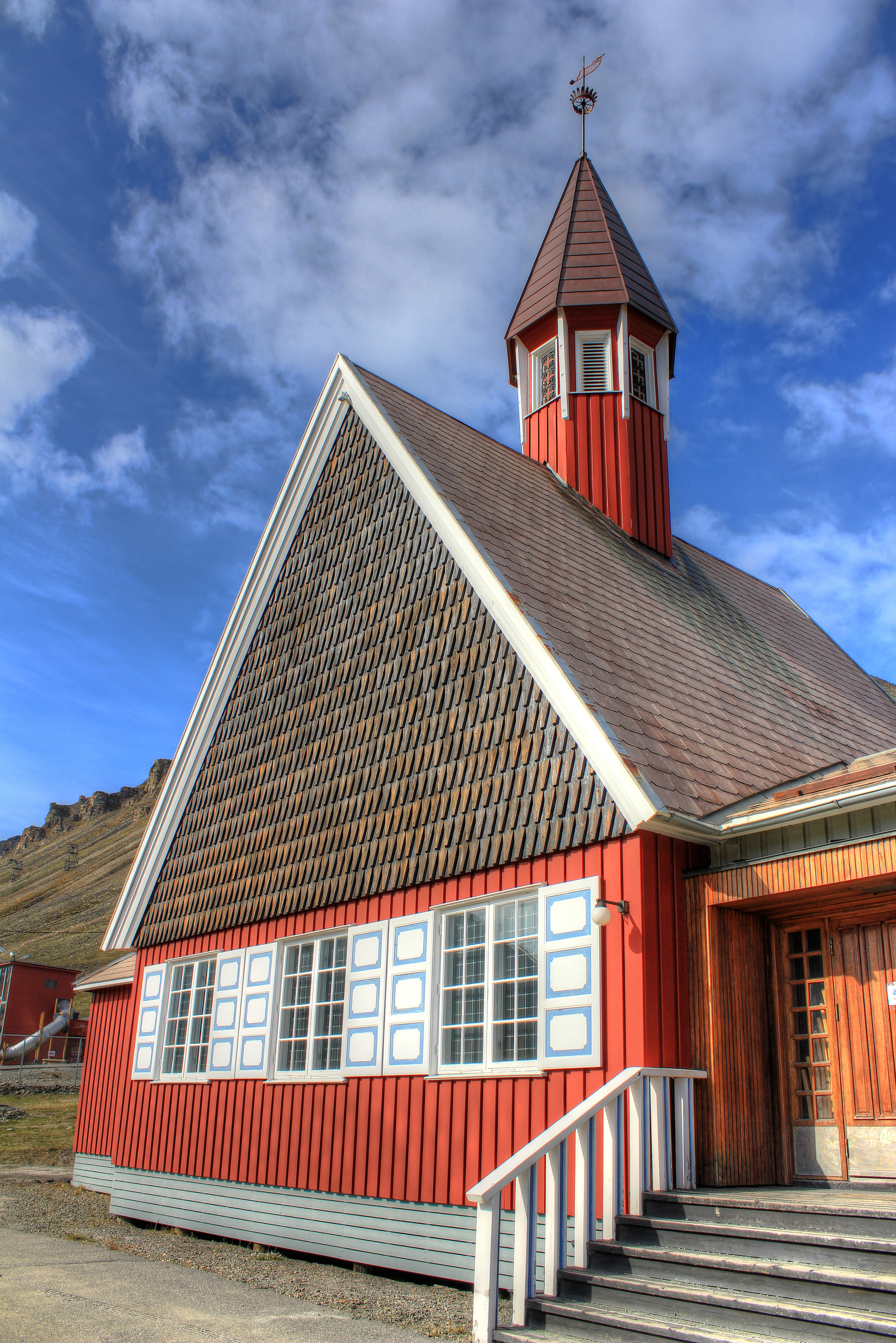
- View of the church
- Svalbard Church
- 78.219800°N 15.618609°E
- Location: Svalbard
- Country: Norway
- Denomination: Church of Norway
- Churchmanship: Evangelical Lutheran
- Website: www.svalbardkirke.no

History
- Status: Parish church
- Founded: 1921
- Consecrated: 24 August 1958

Architecture
- Functional status: Active
- Architect: Hans Magnus
- Architectural type: Rectangular
- Completed: 1958 (68 years ago)

Specifications
- Capacity: 140
- Materials: Wood

Administration
- Diocese: Nord-Hålogaland
- Deanery: Tromsø domprosti
- Parish: Svalbard

Svalbard Church (Norwegian: Svalbard kirke) is a parish church of the Church of Norway in Svalbard municipality in Norway. It is located in the village of Longyearbyen. It is the church for the Svalbard parish which is part of the Tromsø domprosti (arch-deanery) in the Diocese of Nord-Hålogaland. The red, wooden church was built in a rectangular design in 1958 using plans drawn up by the architect Hans Magnus. The church seats about 140 people.

It was the northernmost church in the world until 2017 when the St. Nicholas Russian Orthodox Church was built in Nagurskoye air force base in Russia.

The very isolated church has one minister and two other employees. Svalbard Church is the only church in Svalbard archipelago, but there is a Russian Orthodox chapel in Barentsburg. The Svalbard Church minister visits other communities on Svalbard including Svea and Ny-Ålesund.

== History ==
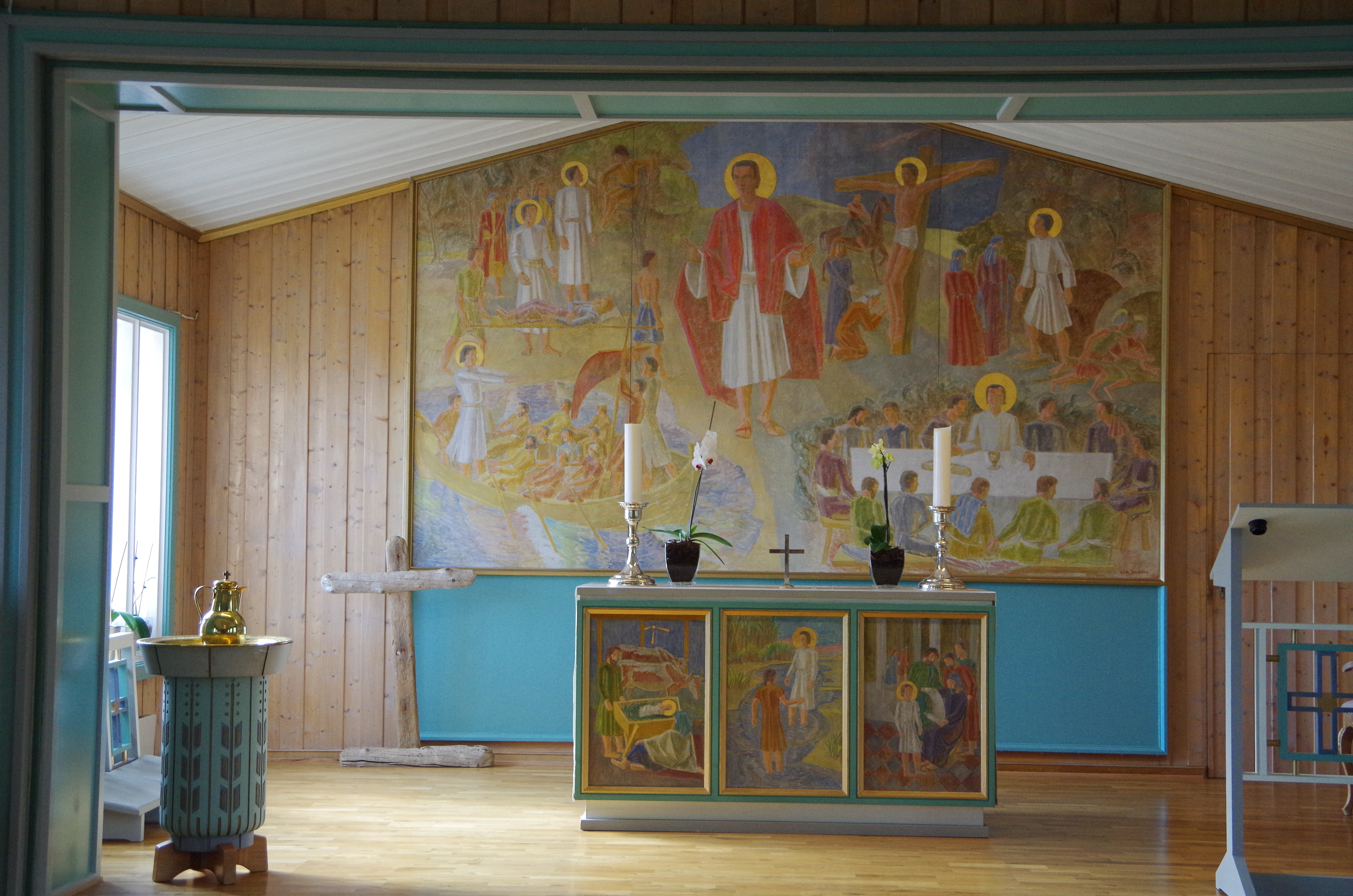
Interior of Svalbard Church

The first church at Longyearbyen was built from July to August in 1921. It was consecrated on 28 August 1921. During World War II, Svalbard was evacuated with the Russians returning to Russia and the Norwegians fleeing to Norway. The pastor of Svalbard Church at that time, took the altar silver, the baptismal font, and the church books on the journey to England. The altar silver and baptismal bowl were gifts from King Haakon VII and Queen Maud when the church was built. In 1943, Longyearbyen was bombed by the German battleships Tirpitz and Scharnhorst, and in the ensuing fires, the church burned down. In 1956, the foundation stone for the new church was laid down. The architect was Hans Magnus, and the church was consecrated on 24 August 1958. The original silver altar candlesticks and baptismal bowl that were saved from the old church were used in the new church too.

== See also ==
- List of churches in Nord-Hålogaland
