= Turid Kjellmann Pedersen =

Norwegian politician

Turid Kjellmann Pedersen (26 September 1937 – 16 August 2012) was a Norwegian politician for the Labour Party.

== Early life and career ==
She was born in Talvik as a daughter of two smallholders. She finished secondary education, and after various jobs she worked at an antiquity shop in Oslo from 1958 to 1970. After an intermezzo as a housewife and smallholder from 1970 to 1985, she worked in tourism until retiring in 1998.

She was a member of Finnmark county council from 1975 to 1987, serving as Deputy County Mayor from 1986 to 1987. From 2003 to 2007, she was a deputy member of the municipal council of Alta Municipality from 2003 to 2007. She was a national board member of the Labour Party from 1973 to 1978 and 1982 to 1987.

She served as a deputy representative to the Parliament of Norway from Finnmark during the term 1981–1985 and 1985–1989. From May to September 1989, she met as a regular representative, covering for Oddrunn Pettersen who was a member of Brundtland's Second Cabinet. A member of the Standing Committee on Transport and Communications, in total she met during 233 days of parliamentary session.

She chaired the board of Finnmark Energi from 1985 to 1991 and was a board member of the Norwegian Farmers and Smallholders Union from 1970 to 1985, Direktoratet for statens skoger from 1980 to 1985, Direktoratet for vilt og ferskvannsfisk from 1981 to 1986, Sami Upper Secondary School from 1986 to 1988 and Nordgass from 1986 to 1997. From 1980 to 1984, she was a supervisory council member of Store Norske Spitsbergen Kulkompani.
