= Ivar Furu (politician) =

Norwegian politician

Ivar Furu (15 October 1928 – 13 January 2012) was a Norwegian engineer, principal and politician for the Centre Party.

He was born in Sunndal Municipality as a son of farmers. After finishing his secondary education in Orkdal Municipality in 1947, he studied to be a construction engineer at the Norwegian Institute of Technology from 1948 to 1962. After a period as engineer in Sunndal and Norderhov Municipality, the latter from 1955 to 1958, he became a lower secondary school teacher in Sunndal Municipality in 1958. From 1968 to 1981 he was the school principal. From 1981 to 1995 he was the chief technical officer of Sunndal Municipality.

Furu was a member of the municipal council of Sunndal Municipality from 1963 to 1971 and 1975 to 1979, and Møre og Romsdal county council from 1967 to 1971 and 1975 to 1979. He chaired Møre og Romsdal Centre Party from 1967 to 1973. He served as a deputy representative to the Parliament of Norway from Møre og Romsdal during the terms 1969–1973, 1973–1977 and 1981–1985. In total he met during 116 days of parliamentary session.

Furu was also a board member of Driva Hydroelectric Power Plant from 1967 to 1987 and Møre og Romsdal Engineers' College from 1971 to 1980.
