= Karsten Anker Solhaug =

Karsten Anker Solhaug (9 November 1914 – 26 August 2012) was a Norwegian salvationist.

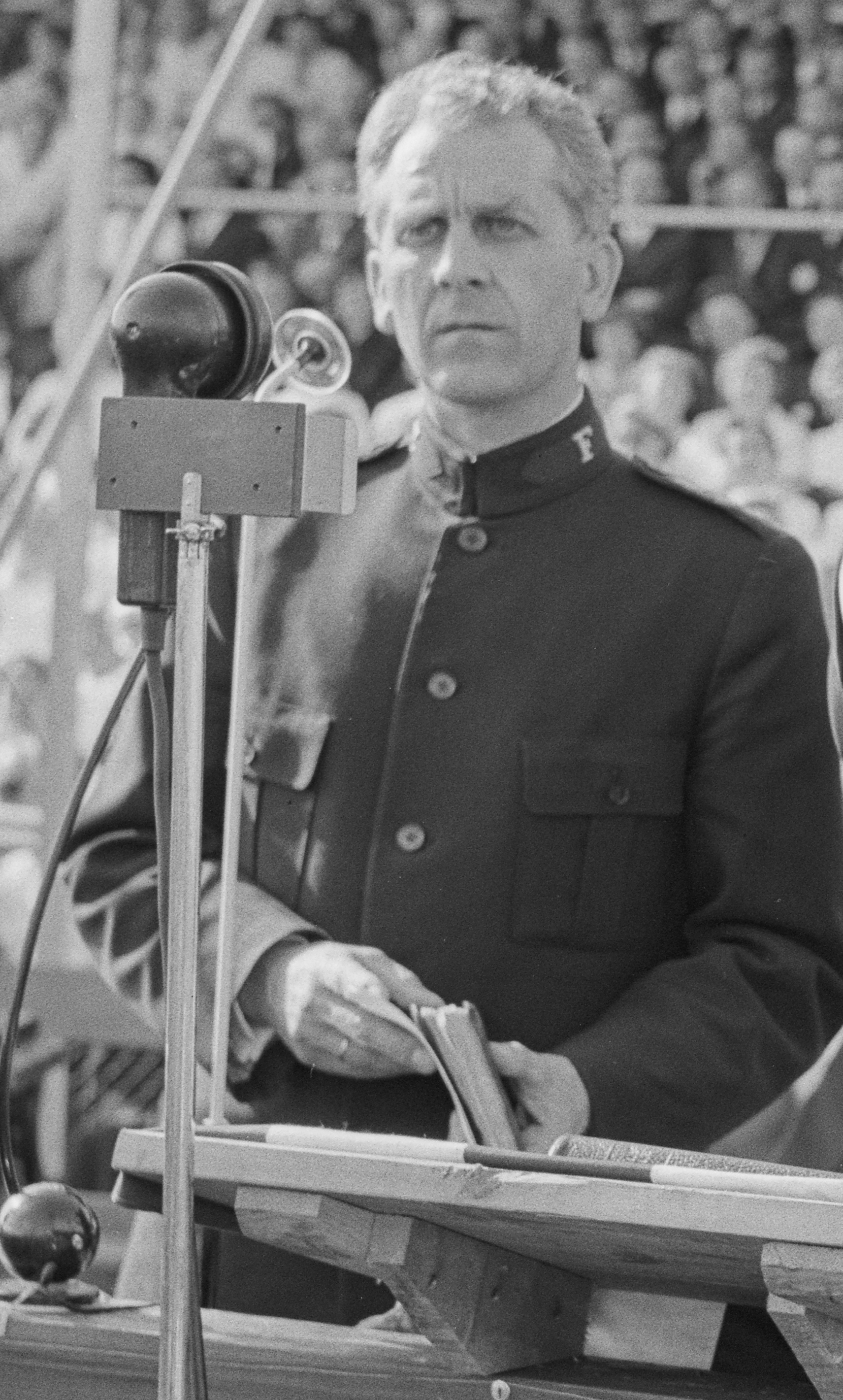
Karsten Anker Solhaug (1914-2012)

He was born in Porsgrunn. He headed the Salvation Army in Norway from 1975 to 1982. He died in 2012.
