= Morten Ræder =

Norwegian surgeon (1939–2012)

Morten Gustav Ræder (22 January 1939 – 5 November 2012) was a Norwegian surgeon.

He earned a dr.med. degree in 1975 and was a specialist in gastric surgery. He was a professor at the University of Oslo, a senior consultant at Ullevål Hospital and a fellow of the Norwegian Academy of Science and Letters.
