= Harald Eidheim =

Norwegian anthropologist (1925–2012)

Harald Eidheim (9 February 1925 − 20 October 2012) was a Norwegian social anthropologist.

He was born in Volda Municipality. In 1946 he moved to Sápmi for the first time, as a teacher in Nesseby, in a region under reconstruction after German troops had employed scorched earth tactics in World War II.

After taking his mag.art. degree in 1958, Eidheim was a research fellow for NAVF from 1959. In 1962 he became lecturer at the University of Oslo, being among the founders of the Department of Social Anthropology. He was promoted to associate professor in 1970 and worked as such until his retirement in 1990. Eidheim did research in Dominica and was a guest scholar at the University of the West Indies (1968–1969), before he later studied the Masai people and was a guest scholar at the International Livestock Centre for Africa (1977–1978). He was also involved in Sami studies and the study of ethnic relations and was an adjunct professor at the University of Tromsø. He died in 2012.
