= Eva Nordland =

Eva Nordland, née Bauge (3 January 1921 – 19 October 2012) was a Norwegian educationalist and activist.

== Personal life ==
She was born in Bærum as a daughter of priest and politician Hans Bauge (1889–1967) and Ester née Egede Nissen (1894–1992). She married Odd Nordland (1919–1999) in 1944, who also became a professor.

== Career ==
She graduated with the mag.art. degree in 1947, followed by the dr.philos. degree in 1955 with a dissertation on child rearing, Sammenheng mellom sosial atferd og oppdragelse med en studie av foreldreholdningen som særskilt faktor.

Appointed as a lecturer in pedagogy at the University of Oslo in 1956, she was promoted to docent in 1963. From 1970 to 1972 she was a professor of psychology at Aarhus University.

From 1974 to 1988 she headed a new subject at the University of Oslo, social pedagogy, and she also influenced the study and teaching of pedagogy in the direction of sociology and social psychology. Sh was an adviser on educational policy for the Labour Party, significantly shaping the school reforms of the 1960s and 1970s—expansion of primary education to nine years, the introduction of general teachers in primary education (teachers with a main focus on pedagogy who taught all of the school's subjects) and the unified upper secondary school. From 1961 to 1969 Nordland also chaired the Council on Teachers' Education.

From 1985 to 1991 she was a professor at the University of Oslo. Her bibliography numbered about 50 titles.

Nordland also chaired the Broadcasting Council. She co-founded Nei til atomvåpen in 1979 and Women For Peace in 1980, chairing the Norwegian Peace Council from 1986 to 1990.
