= Arnfinn Haram =

Arnfinn Andreas Haram O.P. (25 September 1948 - 10 June 2012) was a Norwegian Dominican brother, social debater and nonfiction author, born in Ålesund, raised in Haram Municipality in Sunnmøre and died in Oslo.

== Biography ==
Haram was educated at the Faculty of Theology in Oslo and became a priest for the Church of Norway at Loddefjord Church and Laksevåg Church, both located in Bergen's boroughs. However in 1998 Haram converted to the Latin Church. He made his eternal vows in 2002 and became a Catholic priest in 2003. Haram studied at Angelicum in Rome, where he became a licentiate in theology in 2008 at a dissertation on Cardinal Newman. From 2009 until his death Haram was the superior (monastery) of the Saint Dominic's Church and monastery in Oslo. He was an avid and feared participant in the social debate, and was a firm and highly respected writer in the daily newspaper Klassekampen.

"A poem by my late friend Padre Arnfinn Andreas Haram O.P. He has written many good poems and sermons. He wrote this poem in his time in English. It deserves to be read by all of us for reflection, about our paths forward in life."

TRUST

Now is the hour of trust

There are reasons

How could it be

otherwise?

Signs

friends

encouragement

experience

But not enough

Only

Trust

is enough

Like a nail

you have to hold it

with one hand

The left

Not so good not

so strong but

only keep the

position

the spot

Don’t waver

hold on

be accurate

accurate!

And then:

Use the hammer

again, again, again

beats of confidence

The determined sound

of trust.

== Bibliography ==
- Christian oppseding and church identity: an assessment of IKO with a particular focus on the people's church problem. Oslo, 1978.
- The deanesthetic rule: Reformational heritage and current program. Oslo, 1979.
- Three florentiners: essay and articles on religion, culture and society: 2003-2009 (foreword by Jon Michelet). Efrem publisher, 2009.
- Babylonian harp (afterword by Knut Olav Åmås). Efrem publisher, 2013.
