= Ingebjørg Vaale =

Norwegian politician

Ingebjørg Vaale, née Larsen (25 April 1916 – 2 July 2012) was a Norwegian politician for the Christian Democratic Party.

She was born in Kragerø and attended teachers' college. She worked as a teacher in Kragerø, Notodden, Eidsvåg, and Drangedal, where she settled. She served on the school board and municipal council for Drangedal Municipality plus on the Telemark county council. She was elected as a deputy representative to the Parliament of Norway from Telemark during the term 1977–1981. In total, she met during 12 days of parliamentary session.

Vaale was a deputy member of the Broadcasting Council. She was a supporter of the Christian mission.
