= Arne Henry Jensen =

Norwegian politician

Arne Henry Jensen (30 July 1927 – 12 July 2012) was a Norwegian politician for the Labour Party.

He served as a deputy representative to the Parliament of Norway from Oslo during the term 1958–1961. In total he met during 5 days of parliamentary session.
