= Ivar Ytreland =

Norwegian politician (1926–2012)

Ivar Ytreland (4 April 1926 – 27 December 2012) was a Norwegian businessperson and politician for the Conservative Party.

Born to a fisherman's family in Kristiansund, he was raised in Ålesund, and started a maritime career here. After the Second World War he worked, among others, as a trapper and hunter in Greenland. In 2010 he issued the memoirs Polarminner. In the 1960s he surveyed Svalbard geologically for the company Norsk Polar Navigasjon. He later became chief executive of Trolla Brug and Norsk Vikingolje.

He was a member of the municipal council of Trondheim Municipality and county mayor (fylkesordfører) of Sør-Trøndelag from 1980 to 1991. He served as a deputy representative to the Parliament of Norway from Sør-Trøndelag during the term 1973–1977. In total he met during 35 days of parliamentary session.

He was decorated with the King's Medal of Merit in gold. He lived in Drøbak in his later life, and died in December 2012.

Political offices
| Preceded by Kristoffer Rein | County mayor of Sør-Trøndelag; 1980–1991 | Succeeded by Arnt Frøseth |
