= Siri Myrvoll =

Norwegian politician

Siri Myrvoll (29 June 1944 – 1 May 2012) was a Norwegian politician for the Liberal Party.

She served as a deputy representative to the Parliament of Norway from Hordaland during the term 1993–1997. In total she met during 9 days of parliamentary session.

She was the director for cultural heritage in Bergen from 1993 until 2011, when she fell ill. She was also a board member of the Organization of World Heritage Cities for four years. She died in May 2012.
