= Andreas Lunnan =

Norwegian television presenter

Andreas Lunnan (16 April 1940 – 21 February 2012) was a Norwegian television presenter.

He was born in Åsen Municipality, but mostly resided in Skogn Municipality. He finished his secondary education in 1959, and graduated from teachers' college in 1961. He started his journalistic career in Trønder-Avisa in 1963.

He was hired in Norwegian Broadcasting Corporation (NRK) in 1975 as local correspondent in Steinkjer Municipality, advancing to district director in Nord-Trøndelag in 1983. From 1989 he became known as a program presenter, in 500 editions of the radio show Nitimen as well as the radio show Sølvsuper, the television programs 5-på, Da Capo, Har det på tunga, Rundt et flygel and Gjensynet.

He was married and had four daughters. He suffered from a heart condition, and died in February 2012.
