= Ingvill Raaum =

Norwegian politician

Ingvill Elsebe Raaum (20 July 1935 – 8 May 2012) was a Norwegian politician for the Conservative Party.

She served as a deputy representative to the Parliament of Norway from Akershus during the terms 1969–1973 and 1973–1977. In total she met during seven days of parliamentary session. On the local level she served as mayor of Ski from 1975.
