= Rolf Lindemann =

Norwegian physician (1942–2012)

Rolf Lindemann (30 March 1942 – 27 June 2012) was a Norwegian physician.

He took his medical education at the University of Heidelberg, graduating in 1967. He started as a specialist in pediatrics in 1976 and took the dr.med. degree in 1977. He worked at Rikshospitalet until 1979, when he was hired at Ullevål Hospital. He was one of the country's leading specialists in neonatal medicine. As such he was also a researcher and lecturer in medicine at the University of Oslo. He was decorated as a Knight, First Class of the Order of St. Olav in 2009, and in 2012 he was proclaimed an honorary member of the Norwegian Society of Pediatricians. He died in June 2012, only three days before his retirement.
