= Láhko National Park =

National park in Norway

- IUCN category II (national park)
- Interactive map of Láhko National Park
- Location: Nordland, Norway
- Nearest city: Bodø
- Coordinates: 66°50′30″N 14°14′00″E
- Area: 188 km^{2} (73 sq mi).
- Established: 14 December 2012
- Governing body: Norwegian Directorate for Nature Management

Láhko National Park (Norwegian: Láhko nasjonalpark) is a national park in Nordland county, Norway. It is located within Gildeskål Municipality, Meløy Municipality, and Beiarn Municipality The park contains unique geological features, including Norway's largest area of karst and caves. Rare plants and charales are also found inside the park. The park was established in December 2012 and covers an area of 188 km^{2} (73 sq mi).
