= Per G. Stavnum =

Norwegian diplomat (1941–2012)

Per Gullik Stavnum (26 December 1941 – 14 April 2012) was a Norwegian diplomat.

He was born in Oslo, and is a cand.jur. by education. He started working for the Norwegian Ministry of Foreign Affairs in 1969. He became assistant secretary in the Ministry of Foreign Affairs before started working for the Norwegian Agency for Development Cooperation, including a tenure as the agency representative in New Delhi. He was acting deputy under-secretary of state in the Ministry of Development Cooperation, then served as deputy under-secretary of state in the Ministry of Foreign Affairs from 1989 to 1991.

He was the Norwegian ambassador to Lithuania from 1991 to 1996 where he was decorated with the 2nd Class Order of the Lithuanian Grand Duke Gediminas, to Vietnam from 2000 to 2005 and to Zimbabwe from 2005 to 2008. He was decorated as a Knight, First Class of the Order of St. Olav and as a Commander of the Royal Norwegian Order of Merit. He died on 14 April 2012.
