= Harald Bergseth =

Norwegian soil scientist

Harald Bergseth (11 July 1923 – 28 April 2012) was a Norwegian soil scientist.

He hailed from Gudbrandsdalen. He took his master's degree in physical geography at the University of Oslo, later another degree in physical chemistry as well as the dr.agric. degree. He was a professor in soil science at the Norwegian College of Agriculture until the age of 71, later professor emeritus. He was a fellow of the Norwegian Academy of Science and Letters. He resided in Ås and died in April 2012.
