= Stein Schjærven =

Norwegian marketing agent (1934–2012)

Stein Schjærven (7 October 1934 – 21 November 2012) was a Norwegian marketing agent.

He was born in Oslo. He started his marketing career in Alfsen & Becker in 1958, and ran Schjærven Reklamebyrå, a seminal Norwegian marketing agency, from 1962 to his retirement in 2004. He was awarded the prize Gullblyanten in 1973.

His son Ståle and daughter Sivje took over the agency from 2001.
