= Murder of Sigrid Giskegjerde Schjetne =

2012 murder in Oslo, Norway

Sigrid Giskegjerde Schjetne
- Date: 5 August 2012
- Location: Østensjø, Oslo, Norway
- Outcome: Body discovered on 3 September 2012
- Deaths: Sigrid Giskegjerde Schjetne
- Burial: Alfaset Cemetery (Alna)
- Suspects: Chris Kenneth Giske (born 11 May 1975)
- Charges: Murder; Kidnapping
- Verdict: Compulsory psychiatric care

Sigrid Giskegjerde Schjetne (6 July 1996 – c. August 2012) was a Norwegian teenager who disappeared from the streets of suburban Oslo while walking in the early hours of Sunday, 5 August 2012.

Schjetne was last seen saying goodnight to a friend around midnight on the night between 4 and 5 August 2012. A message was sent from her phone at 00:15 to her friend. The police have never determined whether the message was sent by the 16-year-old herself or by the perpetrator. On 3 September 2012, her body was discovered in the woods, 17 kilometres (11 miles) from the site of her disappearance. A 37-year-old male, later identified as Chris Kenneth Giske, and a 64-year-old male were arrested on charges of murder, and accessory to murder.

The 64-year-old, who had been cooperating with the police, was released from custody in early November 2012. On his release, the Attorney Investigator, Cecilie Gulnes, stated: "The evidence in the case has not been strengthened against the 64-year-old. We have not received any test results linking the 64-year-old to Sigrid or to the homicide." In October 2013, Chris Giske was sentenced to compulsory psychiatric care for the murder after being found to suffer from psychosis as well as paranoid schizophrenia.

== Disappearance ==
On Saturday 4 August 2012, Schjetne attended a Norway Cup soccer game with a group of friends, supporting the Skeid Fotball team. At around 19:45, she was spotted by CCTV on a bus at Tveita, heading home. She ate dinner with her family before leaving to visit another friend. Schjetne started walking home from her friend's home just before midnight, which was her curfew. The walk should have taken her half an hour. When she did not arrive well after this time, the family notified the police.

Approximately an hour later, two boys walking through a local kindergarten found Schjetne's shoes, socks and iPhone, which her friends and family were calling repeatedly. The boys were asked to deliver the items to Schjetne's parents who lived nearby, which they did. Her parents had searched the same kindergarten earlier, at around 00:30. According to them, none of the items were present at that time, which would later lead to speculation that they may have been planted there in the interval between the search and their discovery.

Several neighbours of the site described having heard loud, frantic female screams coming from the area during the night. One neighbour reported observing a car driving at high speed toward the kindergarten immediately prior to hearing the screams. Other witnesses described seeing a mysterious car parked with headlights lit outside the kindergarten on Saturday night. Despite repeated public requests by authorities, no driver came forward.

== Search and investigation ==
=== Initial search ===
Searches for Schjetne began immediately after her disappearance. Hundreds of volunteers from all over the Oslo area congregated in a massive search operation. The family experienced early requests from people who wanted to show support by offering large rewards; one individual offered NOK 500,000 (84,000 US dollars). After conferring with police, the family declined the offers, but they later accepted, and the reward eventually stood at over 950,000 NOK (US $160,000). Volunteers, along with police units, canvassed the neighbourhood and local parks, while search-and-rescue divers from the fire department searched Lake Østensjø, which is near the site of her disappearance.

The search expanded over time to include the forested woodlands adjacent to Oslo, including Østmarka and Nordmarka. A record number of volunteers and search-and-rescue personnel descended upon the area, aided by police helicopters with heat-seeking technology and search dogs. The Norwegian Red Cross came with 40 canine units, which searched 24 hours a day and covered more than 1300 square kilometres, guided by GPS mapping. Several well-known self-proclaimed psychics tried to locate the missing girl. Apart from a white sock which was later determined not to match, and despite the most extensive missing-person search operation in recent Norwegian history, no trace of Schjetne was found.

During the first few days after the disappearance, the Oslo police received almost two thousand leads from the public. They sifted through over 13 hours of surveillance tapes without significant results. On Monday August 6, Norwegian police issued an international alert for Schjetne, and the case was transferred to the Section for Violent and Sexual Crimes. Expert analysts from the National Investigation Service and the Police Security Service were engaged to assist with examining Schjetne's internet and social media history.

The main theory at that time was that Schjetne had been abducted by a person in a car against her will, and that the perpetrator may have used her mobile phone before leaving it at the scene in order to mislead authorities. Seven days after Schjetne's disappearance, on 11 August 2012, her family made an emotional appeal to the perpetrator through the media, calling for her release. Around the same time, it was announced, that prominent lawyer Harald Stabell would be formally appointed to assist the family.

On 16 August 2012, twelve days after Schjetne's disappearance, the partly decomposed remains of a woman were discovered in a private garden area in Ski, a suburb about 30 minutes from downtown Oslo. After speculation, the police announced that it was the body of another person unrelated to the case.

On 22 August 2012, Oslo police announced that they were specifically looking for the driver of a burgundy vehicle that was observed in the area of the disappearance. Police also said they were checking named car-owners; plain clothed police detectives went door-to-door, photographing cars as well as interviewing people in the neighbourhood. More than a hundred addresses were visited in hopes of getting new information.

Almost four weeks into the investigation, police charged a convicted rapist from Schjetne's community with making false statements to the investigators. The man's lawyer, Kim Gerdts, claimed the police had used illegal coercion. Police stated that although he was suspected of lying to the police regarding alleged witness observations, he was not a suspect in the murder case.

=== Possible serial offenders ===
Police stated that they were investigating a possible connection between Schjetne's disappearance and an unnamed serial sex offender who had been linked through DNA evidence to three cases of sexual assault, rape and indecent exposure to minors, all of which happened in the area from which Schjetne vanished. Police conducted voluntary DNA testing of people who lived close to the crime scenes without making a connection to the offender.

The area where Schjetne's body was eventually found, Sofiemyr in Oppegård, is close to the place where two other young women were found murdered after being kidnapped from Oslo during the 1980s. This led to speculation that a serial killer had begun killing again after a 25-year hiatus.

=== Discovery and arrests ===
On 4 September 2012, police announced that Schjetne's body had been found in Sofiemyr (Kolbotn), about 20 minutes from the place where she had disappeared. The body was in a state of decomposition, wrapped up in several layers of plastic and clothing, partly concealed in a wooded, hilly terrain, and adjacent to an industrial area with many derelict buildings. The post mortem, and subsequent forensic report revealed that she had suffered massive head trauma, but ruled out sexual assault or molestation.

At the same time, media reported that two men had been arrested during a raid at a nearby warehouse in connection with the case. The arrests were made by the police tactical unit Delta in an operation set up after receiving a lead from a member of the public. The two men, Chris Kenneth Giske, aged 37, and his unidentified colleague, aged 64, were charged with murder and being an accessory to murder. The 64-year-old had no prior criminal record, but Giske had multiple previous convictions for violent crimes, among them an unprovoked assault on a young woman with a crowbar in 2007. The young woman, who barely survived the attack, suffered a fractured skull, a crush fracture of the head, and a 7-cm cut to the face. Court-appointed psychiatrists, observing Giske at the time, stated that he had anti-social personality disorder, an emotional, unstable personality disorder, and panic disorder. The lawyer for the victim characterized the case as "one of the worst cases I've seen that has not ended in murder". The 23-page psychiatric report from the trial revealed that Giske had suffered from audible hallucinations for over a decade. According to the report, "the voices in his head had commanded him to go out and kill, or physically assault, random people." Both men initially denied having anything to do with Schjetne's disappearance and murder.

In October 2012, the final post mortem report was submitted to police by the forensic pathologist. It concluded that the precise cause of death could not be determined, nor the exact time of death. It could, however, establish several facts, for example, that Schjetne had suffered massive blunt force trauma to the head, chest and abdominal region, and that many of Schjetne's injuries were inflicted after her death.

On 30 October 2012, the 64-year-old suspect was released. The police stated that although they were no longer keeping him in custody, they were not dropping the charges against him. At the same time, a court ordered Giske to be held in isolation for an additional four weeks. About a month later, court-appointed psychiatrists who were to evaluate Giske's mental status requested that he be transferred to Dikemark Hospital and be put under 24-hour observation.

On 9 July 2013, 11 months after Schjetne disappeared, the prosecution formally charged Giske with second-degree murder (Norwegian: Forsettlig drap) and kidnapping. Because the court psychiatrists could not definitely determine his mental status, the prosecution sought compulsory psychiatric care for the defendant, instead of normal prison time.

== Trial ==
The trial opened at Oslo District Court on 16 September 2013, with the Judge Ingemar Nestor Nielsen presiding. Giske was represented by defence attorneys John Christian Elden and Ida Andenæs. He denied the charge of murder and claimed that he was criminally sane and competent, something that the prosecution disagreed with. The defendant was not formally required to enter a plea, since the lead prosecutor, Nina Margoth Prebe decided to seek compulsory psychiatric care rather than an ordinary custodial sentence.

When cross-examined by the assistant prosecutor Jens Olav Sæther, the defendant made a series of claims which were described as "bizarre". He claimed to be in possession of a mirror with apparent magical powers, for example the ability to grant physical protection from enemies or to compel an individual to "confess" bad deeds. He claimed that he had been stalked and harassed in his home-town of Ålesund by groups of local children who were under the direct influence of a prison inmate in Oslo. He said he had received violent threats from members of a child pornography ring. When asked about his psychiatric evaluation, he claimed that the expert neuropsychiatrist who examined him, and concluded that he was suffering from paranoid schizophrenia, was in fact working as a belly dancer in his old neighborhood.

== Verdict ==
Giske was sentenced to compulsory psychiatric care for the murder of Schjetne on 25 October. The court ruled in favour of the prosecution on all counts. The court ruled that while Schjetne was walking home that on the evening of 4 August, Giske had first struck Schjetne with his car, seriously injuring her. He then kidnapped her and drove her to his mechanical workshop in Bryn. He placed her in his trailer home, which was parked inside of a derelict barn.

The court ruled that Schjetne was still alive when she arrived at the trailer, and that some time later she was killed by blunt force trauma to the head, causing massive bleeding. The court came to this conclusion after hearing the analysis of a bloody mattress which was found inside the trailer. It further ruled that Giske had decided to kill Schjetne in order to conceal the kidnapping. After killing her, he wrapped her body in plastic covering before dumping her in the woods next to the workshop.

Giske appealed the sentence, denying the charges, as well as denying that he was mentally ill. Schjetne's parents appealed the amount of financial compensation they had been awarded by the court (NOK 20,000 each). On 16 July 2014 the Norwegian High Court dismissed Giske's appeal, thus exhausting his appeals process.

== Reaction ==
In the aftermath of the disappearance there was an outpouring of sympathy, particularly in the local community, and thousands of people contacted authorities with a desire to help. Among the people who showed their support were a friend of the Schjetne family who acted as a volunteer coordinator and spokesman for them, the crime author Gunnar Staalesen, players from the local football club Vålerenga who participated in the search, and Minister of Education Kristin Halvorsen who mobilised her department to support the family.

Schjetne's funeral service was held on September 19 in Oppsal Church. It drew a crowd of around 700 people, including many notable people such as Minister Halvorsen, and Martin Halla, who sang a tribute song. Officiating at the service was Sturla Stålsett, the son of the former bishop of Oslo Gunnar Stålsett. Her remains were interred at Alfaset Cemetery in the Alna borough.

Five weeks after Schjetne's disappearance, and nearly a week after she was found dead, thousands of residents of Østensjø filled the one-kilometre route Schjetne was walking when she was abducted with candles and torches, in a bid to reclaim the neighbourhood. This "demonstration of light" was intended to re-assert a feeling of safety on the streets of the neighbourhood.

The case had a strong impact on the neighbourhood, the city and the entire nation. Teenagers reported that they no longer felt safe in their communities. Polls showed that over half the country's parents were more afraid for their children than before. In addition, an increased number of women said they felt unsafe being outside after dark.

== See also ==
- Murder of Faiza Ashraf
- Baneheia murders
