= Stig Krohn Haaland =

Norwegian footballer (born 1975)

Personal information
- Date of birth: 23 February 1975 (age 51)
- Place of birth: Haugesund, Norway
- Height: 1.73 m (5 ft 8 in)
- Position: Defender

Youth career
- Vard
- Haugar

Senior career*
Years	Team	Apps	(Gls)
1993	Haugar		
1994–1995	Haugesund		
1995	→ Nord (loan)		
1996	Nord		
1996–1998	Aarhus Fremad B		
1998–2001	Aarhus Fremad		
2001–2003	Hamkam	30	(2)
2002	→ Brann (loan)	1	(0)
2004	Sandefjord	20	(2)
2005	Haugesund		
2006–2007	Breiðablik		
2008	Nord		
2008–2009	Vard		
2011	Vedavåg		

Managerial career
- 2008–2010: Nord
- 2010: Avaldsnes women (caretaker)
- 2011–?: AGF Aarhus (U17)
- * Club domestic league appearances and goals

Stig Krohn Haaland (born 23 February 1975) is a Norwegian former professional footballer and manager.

== Career ==
Hailing from Haugesund, he started his youth career in Vard and joined Haugar as a junior player. In late 1993, Haugar merged to form FK Haugesund, where Haaland played for the senior team from 1994. He was known for a precise left foot. In May 1995 he was loaned out to Nord, later making a permanent move. In the autumn of 1996 he moved to Århus to study, and played for the B team of Aarhus Fremad, but was promoted to the first team and made his debut in the Danish Superliga. He soon became regular on left back.

In 1999 Aarhus Fremad was relegated, and the club faced severe financial problems. According to reports, the wages of February 2000 were delayed. For the 2000–01 season, Haaland went into his last contract year. In October 2000, he was struck by manager Frank Pingel during practice. The news went around Denmark and Norway, and Pingel's manager spell was terminated. Haaland also desired to leave the club in the winter. He went on trial at Hamkam and was subsequently signed.

Playing one and a half seasons for Hamkam, he was loaned by SK Brann in August 2002. Brann did not opt to buy the player, and Haaland missed the entire 2003 season due to injury. He was released and joined Sandefjord on a one-year contract. After seeing the contract through, he had several offers from Norway and went on trial with Randers and Silkeborg before signing for FK Haugesund. His next venture in 2006 was two years in Icelandic Breiðablik.

From 2008 he worked in the Norwegian lower divisions, managing Nord while later playing for Vard. He left Nord in June 2010, when he was also caretaker manager of Avaldsnes. In 2011 he played 4. divisjon for Vedavåg, before moving to Denmark where he was hired as coach for Aarhus Gymnastikforening's U17 team. Over the years, Haaland also facilitated several transfers between Norway and Denmark and Iceland, such as Sanel Kapidžić's move from Denmark to Haugesund and Alexander Søderlund's move to Iceland.
