= Kristelig Gymnasium =

School in Oslo, Norway

Coordinates: 59.9239°N 10.7294°E

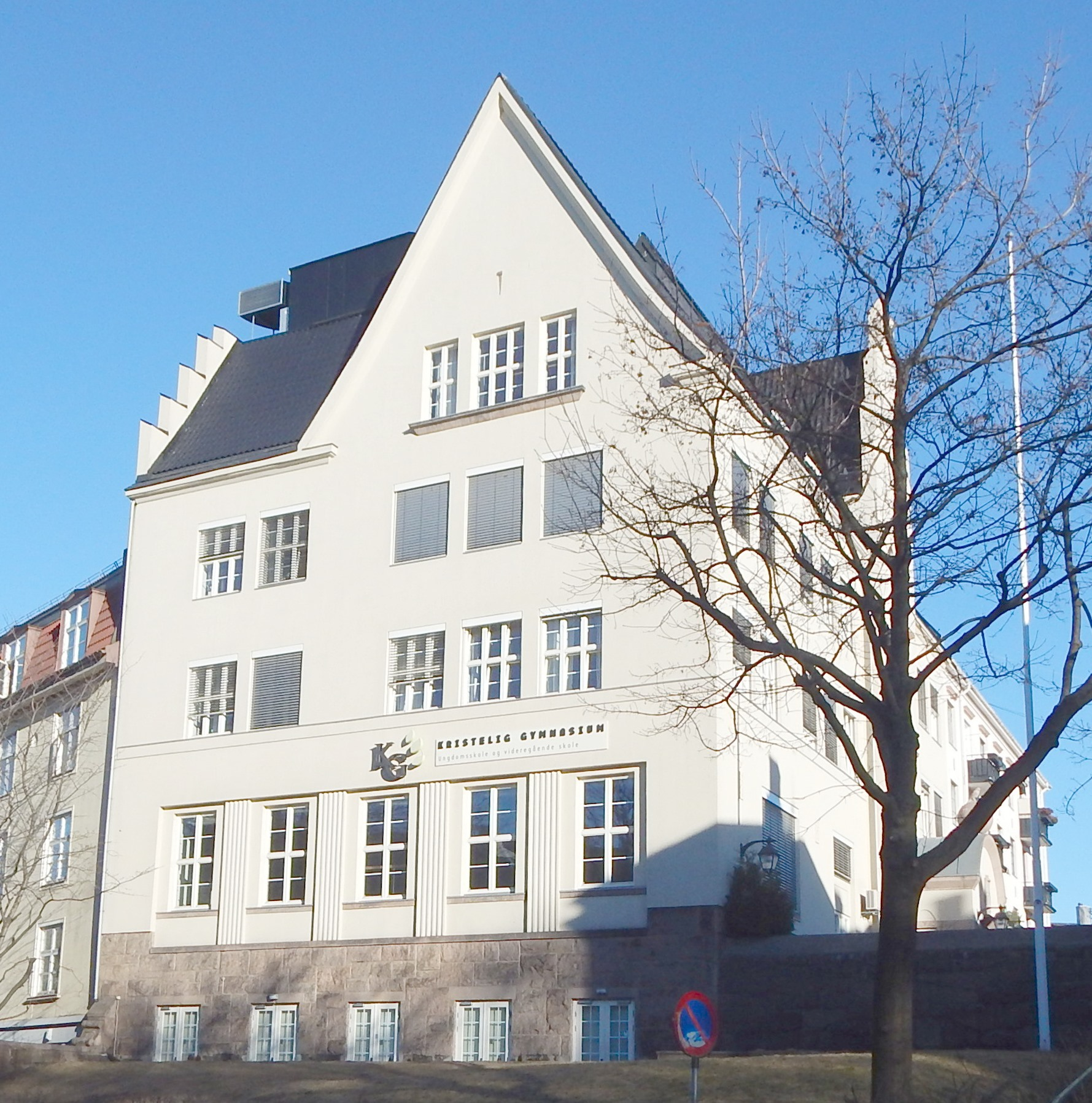
Gamlebygget at Kristelig Gymnasium

Kristelig Gymnasium (KG), founded in 1913, is a selective, private Christian college preparatory school located in Oslo, Norway.

The school offers 3 years of college preparatory studies at the high school level, Videregående skole, offering advanced courses in sciences, languages, and social sciences, including introductory classes to business and law.

In addition, grades 8, 9 and 10 (junior high school) is offered, with the courses mandated by Norwegian law.

The school's students score the highest among all private Norwegian schools in national, standardized tests.

Religion or bible study is a "required elective" for all students. The school has a Lutheran priest on staff, and daily bible studies held by students or faculty is broadcast on the public address system every morning, following daily news and information.

All current students and alumni receives the biannual publication "KG-Nytt".

The school is owned by Det Norske Misjonsselskap, Normisjon and Norsk Luthersk Misjonssamband.

== Campus ==
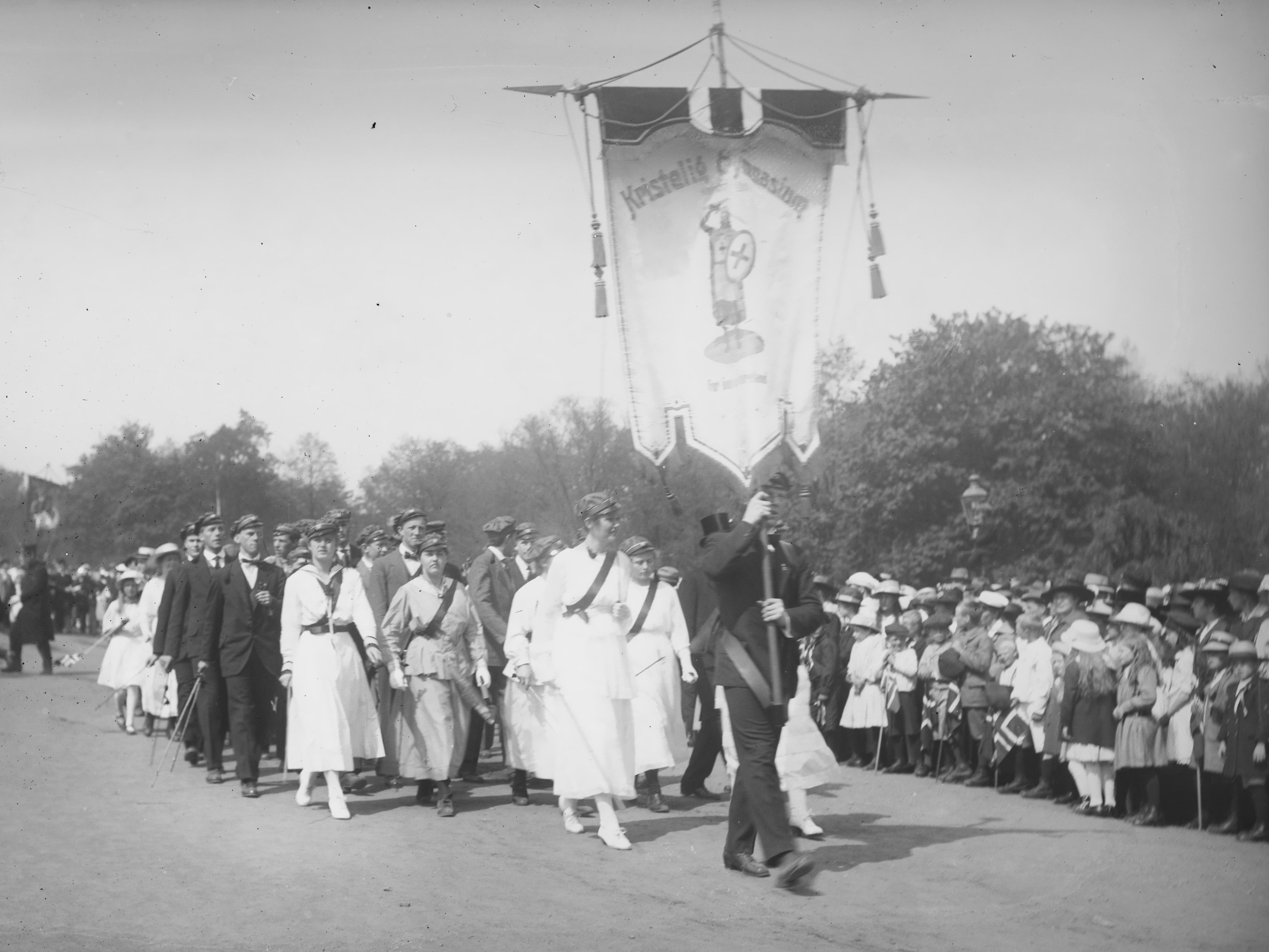
Parade with the school's banner, 1918

Due to increasing admission, the school recently expanded with a third building, adding state of the art science laboratories and fine art rooms. The four buildings are located uptown in Oslo's city center, with the three main buildings located around Homansbakken 2. In addition to two gymnasiums and a weight room, Oslo's famous sports arena Bislett Stadion is used by the school as well.

== Philanthropy ==
The students plan and organize an annual fundraising project, selected among projects run by the founding organizations. The students raised more than 300,000 USD for an Ethiopian project in 2011.

== Notable alumni ==
- Haakon VIII, King of Norway
- Princess Märtha Louise of Norway
- Erling Norvik, politician
- Dagfinn Høybråten, politician
- Kristin Clemet, politician
- Martine Vik Magnussen, murder victim
