= Kari Blom =

Norwegian educationalist (1934–2012)

Kari Blom (6 September 1934 – 15 November 2012) was a Norwegian educationalist.

She started her career as a schoolteacher, and took a master's degree in history.

She was employed as a lecturer at the Bergen Teachers' College in 1981, advancing to associate professor in 1989. In 1994, Bergen Teachers' College was merged with five other educational institutions to form the Bergen University College, where Blom served as the first rector until 2000.

In 2004 she published the book Norsk barndom gjennom 150 år – en innføring, a textbook in the history of childhood in Norway. Around the same time, Ørnulf Hodne also released Barndom i Norge gjennom tusen år, a history of childhood of the last millennium.

Academic offices
Preceded by position established	Rector of Bergen University College; 1994–2000	Succeeded by Karl Olav Nummedal
