= Johannes Ulltveit-Moe =

Norwegian priest

Johannes Ulltveit-Moe (8 October 1941 – 30 January 2012) was a Norwegian church leader and later consultant and civil servant.

He took the cand.theol. degree in 1966 and the priest's seminary in 1966. After completing his compulsory service as a priest in the Royal Norwegian Navy, he was hired as a bible translator in the Norwegian Bible Society in 1968. From 1972 to 1977 he was the vicar of Ballangen Church.

In 1977 Ulltveit-Moe was employed in the National Council of the Church of Norway, and for eleven years until 1990 as managing director. In 1990 he became an adviser in the consulting firm Statskonsult, working with the assessment of governance in Norway. He took a doctor's degree in organizational development and leadership in 1992. From 2003 to his retirement in 2011 he worked in the Ministry of Government Administration, Reform and Church Affairs.

He also applied, unsuccessfully, for positions as permanent under-secretary of state and was shortlisted as Bishop of Nord-Hålogaland. He died in 2012.
