= Liv Buck =

Norwegian trade unionist

Liv Marie Buck (24 December 1928 – 29 March 2012) was a Norwegian trade unionist.

She hailed from Oslo. She entered the union Union of Employees in Commerce and Offices when she started working, and in 1968 she was hired as secretary for women's affairs in the Norwegian Confederation of Trade Unions. She was promoted to secretary in 1971, and became the first woman in the management of the Confederation of Trade Unions. From 1977 to 1989 she served as head secretary. She was succeeded by Jan Balstad. She founded the friendship association Friends of Israel in the Norwegian Labour Movement (Norwegian: Venner av Israel i Norsk Arbeiderbevegelse).

She chaired the Norwegian People's Aid, was a board member of the Equal Wages Council, the Regional Development Fund, the Norwegian Guarantee Institute for Export Credits, the Industry Fund, Rikstrygdeverket and Oslo Kinematografer. She was also a member of the National Wages Board, originally as deputy of Leif Haraldseth but from 1986 as a full member.

She was married to Henry Nicolaysen, leader of the Norwegian Transport Workers' Union. She died in 2012.

Preceded by Svein-Erik Oxholm	Chair of the Norwegian People's Aid; 1983–	Succeeded by
