= Sverre Halvorsen (professor) =

Former Norwegian pediatrician

Sverre Halvorsen (24 July 1925 – 8 August 2012) was a Norwegian pediatrician.

He was born in Bærum, but grew up in the manager's home at the Diakonhjemmet Hospital. He finished his secondary education in 1944 and graduated from the University of Oslo with the cand.med. degree in 1950. After graduating he served in the Independent Norwegian Brigade Group in Germany and practised medicine for some years in the United States.

He was a docent at the University of Oslo from 1965 and professor from 1975; from the same year he was a chief physician at the pediatric department of Ullevål Hospital. Since 1983 he was a fellow of the Norwegian Academy of Science and Letters, and in 1996 he was decorated as a Knight, First Class of the Order of St. Olav.

He died in August 2012, 87 years old.
