= Arne Wegner Haaland =

Norwegian engineer

Arne Wegner Haaland (28 October 1923 – 23 June 2012) was a Norwegian engineer.

He was born in Lunde Municipality in Telemark county. He graduated as a civil engineer from the Norwegian Institute of Technology. In 1955 he was hired by Veidekke to construct an airfield in Ethiopia, and two years later he was contracted to a project in Brazil by the company Furuholmen. He returned to Veidekke in 1960, and served as its chief executive officer from 1962 to 1989. He continued as a board member until 1995. He died in June 2012.

Business positions
| Preceded by | Chief executive of Veidekke; 1962–1989 | Succeeded by Terje Venold |
