= Vidar Theisen =

Norwegian meteorologist (1933–2012)

Vidar Leif Theisen (5 May 1933 – 30 August 2012) was a Norwegian meteorologist, known for his nasal speech and lack of tonal variation during his presentations of the weather forecast. This uncommon speech pattern made him a cult star in Norway, even after his retirement.

== Career ==
Vidar Theisen was born in Oslo and began his studies there. While a student at the University of Oslo, he decided to pursue a career in meteorology and began his education in the field in 1956. He finished his studies two years later in 1958 and began working at the Norwegian Meteorological Institute. In 1980, Theisen began delivering forecasts in the daily news for the Norwegian Broadcasting Corporation (NRK), at the time the only television channel in Norway. He quickly became popular amongst viewers for his nasal, monotone and straightforward delivery of the weather forecasts, which also made him a popular character with comedians, and he was often parodied. He was famously parodied by comedian Trond Kirkvaag, who worked with him in NRK.

In 1998, Theisen had his final forecast on television, but he continued working for the Norwegian Meteorological Institute until his retirement in 2001. After his retirement he made guest appearances on both radio and television from time to time.

== Personal life and death ==
Theisen was married twice. His first wife died during childbirth in 1962, along with their child. He later remarried and had two children, one boy and one girl. He also had several grandchildren. Theisen was a deeply faithful Christian and an active member of his congregation until his death.

In 2002, Theisen was diagnosed with Parkinson's disease, and thus reduced his workload, devoting his time to faith and family. During his final years he had several complications from the disease and withdrew from the public altogether. Theisen died on 30 August 2012 from Parkinson's disease, aged 79.
