= Johnny Myrseth =

Norwegian industrialist and politician

Johnny Levis Myrseth (22 November 1925 – 12 March 2012) was a Norwegian industrialist and politician for the Christian Democratic Party.

He is best known as founder of the furniture company Formfin. In his local community of Hundeidvik he was a sunday school teacher for fifty years, for which he was awarded the King's Medal of Merit in silver in 2004, and also founded the local sports club Hundeidvik IL. He was a deputy mayor of Sykkylven Municipality and member of Møre og Romsdal county council.

He was married twice (his first wife died) and had five children. He died in March 2012.
