= Knut Sydsæter =

Norwegian mathematician

Knut Sydsæter (5 October 1937 – 29 September 2012) was a Norwegian mathematician.

Professor of Mathematics at the University of Oslo.

He is known for having written several books in mathematics for economic analysis, mainly in Norwegian and English. However, his books have been released in several other languages such as Swedish, German, Italian, Chinese, Japanese, Portuguese, Spanish, Russian and Hungarian among others.
