= Lisbet Dæhlin =

Danish-born Norwegian ceramist

Lisbet Dæhlin née Hübschmann (1922–2012) was a Danish-born Norwegian ceramist who is remembered for her blue-glazed jugs and vases. She was among those who helped to develop Norwegian ceramics from practical use to works of art. After studying in Copenhagen, she moved to Norway in 1949 and worked for a time with the sculptor and ceramist Svein Visted (1903–84) in his Lillehammer workshop. Around 1970, she established her own studio in the Frysia district of Oslo where she worked until 2007. She has exhibited widely in Norway and beyond. A number of Dæhlin's creations are in the permanent collection of Norway's National Museum.

== Early life, education and family ==
Born on 17 June 1922 in Lunde, Varde Municipality, in northwest Jutland, Lisbet Hübschmann was the daughter of the miller and amateur painter Jakob Carstensen Jakobsen Hübschmann (1893–1973) and his wife Birgitte Bloch Sørensen (1891–1978). She was the elder sister of the painter Peer Hübschmann (1920–93). From 1942 to 1945 she attended the Arts and Crafts School in Copenhagen. She then gained practical experience in workshops in Denmark and France (1946–48). In July 1950, she married the university teacher Erik Oddvar Dæhlin (1926–2010)

== Career ==
Dæhlin moved to Norway in 1949, working as an assistant to Svein Visted in his ceramics workshop in Lillehammer. There she was able to learn the art of glazing as well how to work with stoneware, a material which was new to Norway. Together with Visted, she presented her works at Galleri Per in Oslo in 1950 at the first Norwegian exhibition of ceramics in an art gallery.

Her success resulted from her ability to transform jugs, vases, teapots and cups into works of art which still ensuring they could be used in practice. With their fine soft lines, her blue-glazed jugs and teapots are reminiscent of paintings by Vermeer. Dæhlin has also decorated rooms, for example the NAVF insurance company building in the Sandakerveien district of Oslo where in 1988 she decorated the walls with a variety of jugs, some resembling waitresses. Dæhlin's creations can be seen in a number of museums, including Norway's National Museum.

Lisbet Dæhlin died in Oslo on 2 July 2012.

== Awards ==
In 1998, Dæhlin received Norway's most significant crafts award, the Jacob Prize.
