= Lauritz Johnson =

Norwegian writer and host

Lauritz Johnson (September 21, 1906 – February 7, 1992) was a Norwegian novelist, children's writer, and radio and television host. He was born in Nøtterøy Municipality, and was the grandson of Gisle Johnson. Nicknamed "Uncle Lauritz", he primarily worked on children's shows, eventually heading the children- and youth department of the Norwegian Broadcasting Corporation. He published the novels Mens vi venter from 1934 and Verden det er meg from 1945.
