= Ted: För kärlekens skull =

- Theatrical release poster
- Directed by: Hannes Holm
- Written by: Hannes Holm
- Screenplay by: Hannes Holm
- Produced by: Lena Rehnberg
- Starring: Adam Pålsson; Peter Viitanen; Happy Jankell
- Music by: Jimmy Lagnefors (incidental music); Ted Gärdestad (songs)
- Production company: Stella Nova Film
- Release date: 3 January 2018 (Sweden)
- Running time: 120 minutes
- Country: Sweden
- Language: Swedish
- Budget: $5 million

Ted: För kärlekens skull (English lit. '"Ted: For Love's Sake"'), also known as Ted: Show Me Love, is a 2018 Swedish film directed and written by Hannes Holm and produced by Lena Rehnberg. Starring Adam Pålsson and Peter Viitanen as Ted and Kenneth Gärdestad, respectively, the film is loosely based on the life of Ted Gärdestad, who was one of Sweden's best-known pop artists in the 1970s, and that of his brother Kenneth, who wrote the lyrics for Ted's songs but did not share his fame.

The film was released on 3 January 2018 in Sweden by Stella Nova Film. It includes a number of Ted and Kenneth Gärdestad's songs, performed by Adam Pålsson.

== Plot ==
In 1971, 15-year-old Ted Gärdestad is playing Björn Borg in the finals of the Swedish tennis championships. He notices Borg's girlfriend Helena Anliot in the audience, and his concentration is disrupted by a sudden inspiration for a song about her. He loses the game, to his father Arne's displeasure. Ted is further inspired by meeting a girl in his school library, who is studying a book about the universe; this leads to Ted and his brother Kenneth writing and recording the songs "Universum" and "Snurra du min värld" and bringing them to the record company Sweden Music in Stockholm. Here they meet Benny Andersson and Stikkan Anderson; Ted pretends that he has left the taped recording at home and starts to play "Jag vill ha en egen måne", catching the interest of the two Anderssons and leading to a contract. Arne has meanwhile tried to get Ted tennis lessons with Björn Borg's coach, and is upset when Ted misses his first coaching session.

During the recording of Ted's debut album "Undringar", with singers Anni-Frid Lyngstad and Agnetha Fältskog and session guitarist Janne Schaffer, Stikkan Andersson tells Kenneth that he cannot keep writing the lyrics for Ted's songs. Ted however refuses to work with any other lyricist, and states that Kenneth is the only person who can express how Ted is feeling. Andersson is more successful in his attempts to persuade Ted to give up his tennis career, saying that he cannot be a singer and a tennis player at the same time. Ted's mother Margit is very supportive of her son's music career, and his father Arne eventually accepts his choice of music over tennis. A period follows when Ted is alternately touring folkparks around Sweden and recording new music.

In 1972, the 16-year-old has a performance at Liseberg where he is mobbed by the enthusiastic audience, finally having to escape through a window with the help of two police officers. Following this ordeal, Ted starts to experience symptoms of schizophrenia, in the form of hallucinations of an intimidating figure dressed in black who tells him not to trust anybody.

Ted becomes one of Sweden's best-known pop singers. He is involved with a number of girls, but after meeting Lotta Ramel at a party and discussing music with her father Povel he starts a longer-term relationship with her, and they eventually get married. He is scheduled for an international tour with ABBA, but chooses to stay with Lotta. She, however, meets another man, a fellow student at the School of the Arts in Malmö, and ends their relationship.

In 1979, Ted composes "Satellit" and wins the 1979 Melodifestivalen contest, which makes him the Swedish representative at the 1979 Eurovision Song Contest in Jerusalem. As he is preparing to go on stage, he suffers a breakdown and starts hearing voices, but after taking a strong dose of Valium he gets on the stage, albeit with a lacklustre performance that yields very few points. At his hotel room after the contest, he suffers new hallucinations.

In the following years, Ted searches for calm and a sense of identity, and he is introduced to the Rajneesh movement. He starts to distance himself from his family in various ways, choosing to perform lyrics written by Finn Kalvik over those created by Kenneth, which causes Kenneth to punch Kalvik in the face in frustration. Ted also begins a new relationship, with actress Ann Zacharias, and has a daughter with her. At the same time he gradually becomes more and more involved with the Rajneesh movement and gives large sums of money to them. Not long before his second child with Zacharias is due, Ted leaves her and moves to Rajneeshpuram in Oregon.

Ted returns from Oregon in 1986. His parents, together with Kenneth and his family, welcome him back but are embarrassed by his obsessive cleanliness and germophobia. In the basement of their parents' home, Kenneth tries to talk to Ted about music and family, saying that Ann Zacharias would welcome getting in touch and that Ted might try to play just for the fun of it, but he is attacked by an enraged Ted who accuses Kenneth of siding with the demons tormenting him.

Ted continues to struggle with his mental health problems, making Kenneth increasingly worried. After an episode where Ted destroys a framed publicity photo and his guitar, Kenneth manages to comfort him and Ted suddenly realises that the intimidating man in his hallucinations does not actually exist. He tells Kenneth that he wants him to write lyrics for him again, repeating his statement from the beginning of the film that Kenneth is the only lyricist who can express Ted's feelings. Kenneth writes the Swedish lyrics for "Blue Virgin Isles", and at an outdoor concert in Stockholm, Ted publicly acknowledges Kenneth's support, and performs the song in front of an audience where Ann Zacharias and his two children can be seen, together with Ted's parents and other people who have been important to him.

The final scene of the film takes place at Midsummer 1997, and hints at Ted Gärdestad's suicide, showing him hallucinating about the girl from the school library and walking towards a light background while his family, unknowing, celebrates Midsummer together.

== Cast ==
- Adam Pålsson as Ted Gärdestad
- Peter Viitanen as Kenneth Gärdestad
- Maria Kulle as Margit Gärdestad
- Johan Hedenberg as Arne Gärdestad
- Jonas Karlsson as Stikkan Anderson
- Tove Edfeldt as Kicki Gärdestad
- Happy Jankell as Lotta Ramel
- Lotta Ramel as Susanna Ramel
- Dan Johansson as Povel Ramel
- Hanna Alström as Ann Zacharias
- Gustav Orvefors as Janne Schaffer
- Edvin Bredefeldt as Benny Andersson
- Jonas Bane as Björn Ulvaeus
- Amanda Gylling as Agnetha Fältskog
- Angelina Håkansson as Anni-Frid Lyngstad
- Kristoffer Veiersted as Finn Kalvik
- Sajid Malik as Bhagwan Shree Rajneesh (Note: Both the names "Bhagwan" and "Rajneesh" are mentioned in the dialogue of the film.)
- Ludvig Lindblom as Björn Borg
- Mikaela Ardai Jennefors as Helena Anliot
- Niklas Strömstedt as Bo Strömstedt

== Production ==
Principal photography began in February 2017 at various locations; Stockholm, Gothenburg, and Trollhättan. Additional filming was done on Tanumshede, a Swedish town that depicts Oregon, United States, in the film. The budget was reportedly to be 43 million Swedish kronor (5 million USD).

== Soundtrack ==
Ted - För kärlekens skull (Musiken från filmen)

Soundtrack album by Adam Pålsson
- Released: 5 January 2018
- Genres: Soft rock, vispop
- Length: 49:12
- Label: Universal
- Producer: Martin Höper

On 5 January 2018, the music for the film was released on an album, "Ted - För kärlekens skull (Musiken från filmen)", with Ted Gärdestad's songs being covered by Adam Pålsson.

=== Track listing ===
All tracks are written by Ted Gärdestad and Kenneth Gärdestad.

No.	Title	Performer	Length
1.	"Jag vill ha en egen måne"	Adam Pålsson	3:07
2.	"Sol, vind och vatten"	Pålsson	3:08
3.	"Snurra du min värld"	Pålsson	3:06
4.	"Universum"	Pålsson	3:56
5.	"Come Give Me Love" ( (Note: Despite the given English title, "Come Give Me Love" was written in Swedish.))	Pålsson	3:28
6.	"Himlen är oskyldigt blå"	Pålsson	4:51
7.	"Oh, vilken härlig da'"	Pålsson	3:30
8.	"Jag ska fånga en ängel"	Pålsson	3:44
9.	"Satellit"	Pålsson	2:58
10.	"Helena"	Pålsson	3:21
11.	"Helt nära dej"	Pålsson	3:16
12.	"Angela"	Pålsson	2:49
13.	"För kärlekens skull"	Pålsson	5:20
14.	"Sommarlängtan"	Pålsson	2:38
