= Kalendarium 1972–93 =

Compilation album by Ted Gärdestad

Compilation album by Ted Gärdestad
- Released: 30 November 1993
- Recorded: 1972–1993
- Genre: Pop music
- Label: Polar; PolyGram; Universal Music Group
- Producer: Benny Andersson; Björn Ulvaeus; Ted Gärdestad; Michael B. Tretow; Janne Schaffer; Eirik W. Wangberg; Anders Glenmark

Ted Gärdestad chronology
Stormvarning (1981)	Kalendarium 1972–93 (1993)	Äntligen på väg (1994)

Professional ratings
Review scores
Source	Rating
AllMusic	3/5 stars

Kalendarium 1972–93 is a compilation album from Swedish singer/songwriter Ted Gärdestad, released in 1993. It includes the best-known songs from his career as well one new recording, "För Kärlekens Skull", his first in twelve years. Kalendarium also included a Swedish language re-recording of the title track from his 1978 album Blue Virgin Isles, "Himlen Är Oskyldigt Blå".

== Track listing ==
All lyrics written by Kenneth Gärdestad, music by Ted Gärdestad

1. "Jag vill ha en egen måne" (1972) - 3:17
2. "Helena" (1972) - 3:19
3. "Snurra du min värld" (1972) - 2:59
4. Jag ska fånga en ängel" (1973) - 3:50
5. "Sol, vind och vatten" (1973) - 3:10
6. "Eiffeltornet" (1974) - 3:04
7. "Buffalo Bill" (1974) - 3:53
8. "Angela" (1976) - 3:00
9. "Chapeau-Claque" (1976) - 3:55
10. "Klöversnoa" (1976) - 2:00
11. "Rockin' 'n' Reelin'" (Swedish version) (1975) - 3:00
12. "Himlen är oskyldigt blå" (Swedish-language version of "Blue Virgin Isles") (1978/1993) - 4:34
13. "Låt Solen värma dig" (Solo version) (1981) - 3:33
14. "Satellit" (1979) - 4:22
15. "Låt kärleken slå rot" (1981) - 4:48
16. "För kärlekens skull" (1993) - 4:03

== Production ==
- Benny Andersson - producer (tracks 1–11, 15)
- Björn Ulvaeus - producer (tracks 1–11)
- Ted Gärdestad - producer (tracks 4–11, 13)
- Michael B. Tretow - producer (tracks 6–10)
- Eirik W. Wangberg - original producer (track 12, "Blue Virgin Isles"/Himlen Är Oskyldigt Blå")
- Janne Schaffer - producer (track 14)
- Anders Glenmark - producer (track 16), remix (track 12, "Blue Virgin Isles"/"Himlen Är Oskyldigt Blå")
