= Äntligen på väg (Ted Gärdestad album) =

Studio album by Ted Gärdestad
- Released: 30 November 1994
- Recorded: 1994
- Genre: Pop music
- Length: 49:18
- Label: Polar Music; PolyGram; Universal Music Group
- Producer: Janne Schaffer, Björn Afzelius

Ted Gärdestad chronology
Kalendarium 1972-93 (1993)	Äntligen på väg (1994)

Professional ratings
Review scores
Source	Rating
AllMusic	2.5/5 stars

Äntligen På Väg is the eighth and final studio album by Swedish singer/songwriter Ted Gärdestad, issued on the Polar Music label in 1994, his first full-length release since 1981's Stormvarning. Äntligen På Väg which was produced by his longtime friend Janne Schaffer and Leif Larsson, includes the hits "Ge En Sol", "Hon Är Kvinnan", "I Min Radio" and "Om Du Ville Ha Mig". It was Gärdestad's last album before his death in 1997.

== Track listing ==
All lyrics are written by Kenneth Gärdestad; all music is composed by Ted Gärdestad.

No.	Title	Length
1.	"Ge en sol"	2:58
2.	"Hon är kvinnan"	3:29
3.	"Om du ville ha mig"	3:49
4.	"Lyckliga dagar"	4:34
5.	"Hoppets eld"	2:50
6.	"Tid faller hårt" (duet with Marie Bergman)	4:42
7.	"Äntligen på väg"	2:37
8.	"I min radio"	2:39
9.	"Natt efter natt"	3:15
10.	"Jag bygger ett torn"	2:59
11.	"Champagnegatan"	4:25
12.	"Ruva min själ"	3:05
13.	"Kärleken är störst"	3:08
14.	"I den stora sorgens famn"	4:38

== Personnel ==
- Ted Gärdestad - lead vocals, piano
- Janne Schaffer - guitars, electric sitar
- Staffan Astner - guitars
- Lasse Englund - guitars
- Leif Larsson - synthesizer, keyboards
- Peter Ljung - synthesizer, organ, piano
- Backa Hans Ericsson - bass guitar
- Svante Henryson - bass guitar
- Johan Granström - bass guitar
- Per Lindvall - drums, percussion
- Mats Persson - drums, percussion
- Björn J:son Lindh - piano
- Per "Ruskträsk" Johansson - alto saxophone
- David Wilczewski - tenor saxophone
- Hans Arktoft - baritone saxophone
- Leif Lindvall - trumpet
- Lennart Wijk - trumpet
- Olle Holmqvist - trombone
- Marie Bergman - vocals
- Sös Fenger - backing vocals
- Gladys del Pilar - backing vocals
- Cai Högberg - backing vocals
- Magnus Rongedal - backing vocals
- Henrik Rongedal - backing vocals

== Production ==
- Janne Schaffer - producer
- Björn Afzelius - producer
- Leif Larsson - producer
- Björn J:son Lindh - string arrangements
- Peter Ljung - string and brass arrangements
- Recorded at Polar Studios and Europa Studios, Stockholm
- Lennart Östlund - sound engineer
- Leif Allansson - sound engineer

== Charts ==
Chart (1994–1995)	Peak position
Swedish Albums (Sverigetopplistan)	21

== Sources and external links ==
- Official home page, The Ted Gärdestad Society
- Liner notes Äntligen På Väg, Ted Gärdestad, Polar Music/PolyGram 523 835-2, 1994
- Allmusic.com entry, Äntligen På Väg, Ted Gärdestad, 1994
