= Upptåg =

Studio album by Ted Gärdestad
- Released: 30 November 1974
- Recorded: 1974
- Studio: Metronome, Stockholm, Sweden
- Genre: Pop
- Length: 32:26
- Label: Polar (original release); Universal Music Group
- Producer: Benny Andersson; Björn Ulvaeus

Ted Gärdestad chronology
Ted (1973)	Upptåg (1974)	Franska Kort (1976)

Professional ratings
Review scores
Source	Rating
Allmusic	link

Upptåg is the third studio album from Swedish singer/songwriter Ted Gärdestad, released in 1974 on the Polar Music label. It contains the hits "Fantomen", "Silver", "Eiffeltornet" and "Viking". The album was produced by Benny Andersson, Björn Ulvaeus and Ted, engineered by Michael B. Tretow and features vocals by Agnetha Fältskog and Anni-Frid Lyngstad.

A non-album single followed in early 1975, the Melodifestivalen entry "Rockin 'n' Reelin'" (#7), backed with an English-language version of the track "Jag Ska Fånga En Ängel" from 1973 album Ted, entitled "Gonna Make You My Angel". Both the English-language version of "Rockin 'n' Reelin'" and "Gonna Make You My Angel" remain unreleased on CD.

== Track listing ==
Music by Ted Gärdestad, lyrics by Kenneth Gärdestad

Side A:

1. "Silver" – 3:33
2. "Öppna din himmel" – 2:43
3. "Viking" – 3:37
4. "Buffalo Bill" – 3:53
5. "Love Comes" – 3:18

Side B:

1. "Eiffeltornet" – 3:04
2. "Goliat från gat" – 3:54
3. "Can't Stop The Train" – 3:18
4. "Fantomen" – 3:02
5. "Regnbågen" – 2:04

== Personnel ==
- Ted Gärdestad – lead vocals, acoustic guitar
- Benny Andersson – honky-tonk piano, Moog synthesizer, Mellotron
- Björn J:son Lindh – piano, flute
- Janne Schaffer – electric guitar
- Lasse Wellander – acoustic guitar
- Mike Watson – bass guitar
- Johnny Gustafsson – bass
- Ola Brunkert – drums
- Bengt Belfrage – horn "Regnbågen"
- Kenneth Arnström – soprano saxophone "Eiffeltornet", alto saxophone "Silver"
- Christer Eklund – tenor saxophone "Buffalo Bill"
- Jan Kling – tenor saxophone "Buffalo Bill"
- Malando Gassama – congas
- Agnetha Fältskog – backing vocals
- Anni-Frid Lyngstad – backing vocals
- Lena Karlsson-Ericsson – backing vocals
- Liza Öhman – backing vocals
- Kai Kjäll – backing vocals

== Production ==
- Benny Andersson – producer
- Björn Ulvaeus – producer
- Ted Gärdestad – producer
- Michael B. Tretow – sound engineer
- Rune Persson – sound engineer
- Åke Elmsäter – sound engineer
- Björn J:son Lindh – strings and brass arrangements
- Recorded at Metronome Studios, Stockholm
- Originally released as Polar POLS 253, 1974.

== Sources and external links ==
- Official home page, The Ted Gärdestad Society
- Liner notes Upptåg, Ted Gärdestad, Polar Music POLS 253, 1974.
- Allmusic.com entry, Upptåg, Ted Gärdestad, 1974
