= Franska Kort =

Studio album by Ted Gärdestad
- Released: 30 November 1976
- Recorded: August 1975–May 1976
- Genre: Pop music
- Length: 38:23
- Labels: Polar (original release); Universal Music Group
- Producers: Benny Andersson; Björn Ulvaeus; Ted Gärdestad; Michael B. Tretow

Ted Gärdestad chronology
Upptåg (1974)	Franska Kort (1976)	Blue Virgin Isles (1978)

Franska Kort is the fourth studio album from Swedish singer/songwriter Ted Gärdestad, released in 1976 through Polar Music. It contains the hits "Angela", "Chapeau-Claque", "När Showen Är Slut" and "Klöversnoa". The album was produced by Benny Andersson, Björn Ulvaeus, Michael B. Tretow and Gärdestad, while featuring vocals by Anni-Frid Lyngstad. It was re-released in 2009.

Professional ratings
Review scores
Source	Rating
AllMusic	3/5 stars

== Track listing ==
All lyrics written by Kenneth Gärdestad, music by Ted Gärdestad

Side A:

1. "Angela" - 3:00
2. "Franska Kort" - 3:52
3. "Helt Nära Dej" - 3:13
4. "Humbuggie-Woogie" - 3:00
5. "Betlehem" - 4:15

Side B:

1. "Chapeau-Claque" - 3:55
2. "Magical Girl" - 4:15
3. "Kejsarens Kläder" - 4:00
4. "Ring Ding Dingeling Dae (Sagan Om Riddaren I Kung Leijonhiertas Hov)" - 3:10
5. "När Showen Är Slut" - 3:43
6. "Klöversnoa" - 2:00

== Personnel ==
- Ted Gärdestad - lead vocals, acoustic guitar, piano
- Benny Andersson - piano, keyboards
- Per-Erik Hallin - piano, keyboards
- Björn J:son Lindh - piano, flute
- Björn Ulvaeus - acoustic guitar
- Janne Schaffer - acoustic guitar, electric guitar
- Lasse Wellander - electric guitar
- Mike Watson - bass guitar
- Rutger Gunnarsson - bass
- Ola Brunkert - drums
- Rolf Alex - drums
- Roger Palm - drums
- Jan Kling - bass clarinet, saxophone
- Ulf Andersson - saxophone
- Sven Larsson - tuba
- Malando Gassama - percussion
- Anni-Frid Lyngstad - backing vocals
- Lena Andersson - backing vocals
- Ann-Louise Hanson - backing vocals
- Maritza Horn - backing vocals
- Inger Öst - backing vocals
- Anders Glenmark - backing vocals
- Lasse Holm - backing vocals
- Lasse Westmann - backing vocals

== Production ==
- Benny Andersson - producer
- Björn Ulvaeus - producer
- Ted Gärdestad - producer
- Michael B. Tretow - producer and sound engineer
- Rutger Gunnarsson - string arrangements
- Wlodek Gulgowski - string arrangements
- Recorded at Metronome Studios and Glen Studios, Stockholm
- Originally released as Polar POLS 269, 1976.

== Charts ==
Chart (1976)	Peak position
Swedish Albums (Sverigetopplistan)	3
