= Ted (album) =

Studio album by Ted Gärdestad
- Released: 1 March 1973
- Recorded: October 1972 – February 1973
- Studios: Metronome, Stockholm, Sweden
- Genre: Pop
- Length: 37:25
- Label: Polar
- Producers: Benny Andersson; Björn Ulvaeus

Ted Gärdestad chronology
Undringar (1972)	Ted (1973)	Upptåg (1974)

Professional ratings
Review scores
Source	Rating
AllMusic	3/5 stars

Ted is the second studio album from Swedish singer/songwriter Ted Gärdestad, released in 1973 through Polar Music. It contains the hits "Jag Ska Fånga En Ängel", "Sol, Vind Och Vatten", "Come Give Me Love" as well as his 1973 Melodifestivalen entry "Oh Vilken Härlig Da'". The album was produced by Benny Andersson, Björn Ulvaeus and Ted, engineered by Michael B. Tretow and features backing vocals by Agnetha Fältskog and Anni-Frid Lyngstad. The CD version of the album was released in 1991.

An English-language version of the track "Jag Ska Fånga En Ängel" entitled "Gonna Make You My Angel" was released as a single in 1974. The album charted on the Swedish Albums Chart and peaked at number seven in week 26 of 2020. In 2021, it reached a new peak of number six.

The Swedish female duo group First Aid Kit has recorded both Swedish and English cover versions of "Come Give Me Love" (single 2020).

== Track listing ==
All lyrics written by Kenneth Gärdestad, music by Ted Gärdestad

Side A:

1. "Jag ska fånga en ängel" – 3:50
2. "Sol, vind och vatten" – 3:10
3. "Skolsång" – 3:02
4. "Kaliforniens guld" – 2:37
5. "Come Give Me Love" – 3:32
6. "Ramanagaram" – 2:50

Side B:

1. "Oh, vilken härlig da'" – 3:21
2. "Kom i min fantasi" – 2:34
3. "Universum" – 3:52
4. "Gitarren och jag" – 3:52
5. "Stenansiktet" – 4:45
  - From the Jan Halldoff movie of the same name

== Personnel ==
=== Musicians ===
- Ted Gärdestad – lead vocals, acoustic guitar, piano
- Benny Andersson – piano, cembalo, vibraphone, Moog synthesizer, backing vocals
- Björn Ulvaeus – acoustic guitar, banjo, mandolin, backing vocals
- Janne Schaffer – electric guitar
- Mike Watson – bass guitar
- Ola Brunkert – drums
- Roger Palm – drums
- Rutger Gunnarsson – banjo
- Agnetha Fältskog – backing vocals
- Anni-Frid Lyngstad – backing vocals
- Lena Andersson – backing vocals
- Luciano Mosetti – harmonica

=== Production ===
- Benny Andersson – producer
- Björn Ulvaeus – producer
- Ted Gärdestad – producer
- Michael B. Tretow – sound engineer
- Rune Persson – sound engineer
- Åke Elmsäter – sound engineer
- Sven-Olof Walldoff – string arrangements "Universum" and "Kaliforniens Guld"
- Lasse Samuelsson – brass arrangement
- Recorded at Metronome Studios, Stockholm
- Originally released as Polar POLS 241, 1973

== Charts ==
=== Weekly charts ===
Weekly chart performance for Ted
Chart (2017–2022)	Peak position
Swedish Albums (Sverigetopplistan)	5

=== Year-end charts ===
Year-end chart performance for Ted
Chart	Year	Position
Swedish Albums (Sverigetopplistan)	2022	35
Swedish Albums (Sverigetopplistan)	2023	30
Swedish Albums (Sverigetopplistan)	2024	24
Swedish Albums (Sverigetopplistan)	2025	76
