= Blue Virgin Isles =

Studio album by Ted Gärdestad
- Released: 15 November 1978; March 1979 (re-release)
- Recorded: 1977–1978 (1979, re-release)
- Studios: Sound Labs Inc., Capitol Studios, Western Recorders and Hollywood Sound Recorders, Los Angeles, California; Whitney Studios, Glendale, California; Bastun Studios, Marcus Music and KMH Studios, Stockholm
- Genres: Pop, rock
- Labels: Polar (Scandinavia); Epic Records (UK); Polydor Records (West Germany, The Netherlands & Portugal); Carnaby (Spain); RCA (Australia); Discomate (Japan)
- Producer: Eirik W. Wangberg

Ted Gärdestad chronology
Franska Kort (1976)	Blue Virgin Isles (1978)	I'd Rather Write a Symphony (1980)

Alternative cover
- Japanese edition

Blue Virgin Isles is the fifth studio album and international debut album by Swedish singer-songwriter Ted Gärdestad, released in November 1978 by Epic Records in the UK and Polar Music in Scandinavia.

== Background ==
=== Recording ===
The Blue Virgin Isles album was mainly recorded in Hollywood, California with a large number of noted American and English musicians, among them Jim Keltner, Jay Graydon, Lee Ritenour, Fred Tackett, James Newton Howard, Dr. John, John Mayall, Chuck Domanico, Mike Melvoin, four of the future members of Toto; Jeff Porcaro, Steve Porcaro, David Hungate and Steve Lukather, and backing vocals by David Cassidy, Venetta Fields and Sherlie Matthews. The album was produced by Norwegian-American Eirik W. Wangberg, also known as Eirik The Norwegian, a nickname given to him by Paul McCartney during the sessions for McCartney's 1971 album Ram. The Blue Virgin Isles recordings began in the United States in the autumn of 1977 and were completed with some additional overdubs made at Bastun Studio, Marcus Music, and KMH Studios, Stockholm in the summer of 1978.

=== Promotion and reception ===
The album spawned two single releases, "Take Me Back To Hollywood" and "Love, You're Making All The Fools". "Take Me Back To Hollywood" was a re-recording of Swedish hit single "Chapeau-Claque" from the preceding album Franska Kort, produced by Benny Andersson and Björn Ulvaeus, Michael B. Tretow and Gärdestad himself. In The Netherlands, the B-side Back in the Business was chosen as the single. It failed to chart.<https://www.top40.nl/ted-gardestad/ted-gardestad-back-in-the-business-13441> The Blue Virgin Isles album was promoted by a guest appearance on ABBA's BBC TV special ABBA in Switzerland a.k.a. Snow Time Special, filmed in Leysin and broadcast worldwide in April 1979. Despite this and a number of other personal appearances in West Germany, The Netherlands, the UK, the US and the Scandinavian countries in the winter of 1978 and the spring of 1979 as well as receiving generally favourable reviews by music critics, Blue Virgin Isles was only a moderate commercial success; in Sweden the album peaked at number 29 on the Albums Chart and only spent one week on the chart.

=== Eurovision and release ===
After having won the 1979 Melodifestivalen, the Swedish pre-selections for the Eurovision Song Contest, with the song "Satellit"/"Satellite" in February 1979 the Blue Virgin Isles album was re-released both internationally and domestically to include this track. The second Polar Music edition of the album features both the Swedish and English language versions of the song. "Satellit" received a disappointing eight points in the contest, held on 31 March 1979 in Jerusalem, and finished seventeenth out of nineteen participating entries, making it Sweden's second lowest placing in the contest up until that point. Despite the added Eurovision exposure, the second attempt to promote the Blue Virgin Isles album consequently met with the same result as the first, both internationally and in Sweden.

When Gärdestad made his comeback on the music scene in 1993 he re-recorded a Swedish language version of the title track "Blue Virgin Isles", entitled "Himlen Är Oskyldigt Blå" ("The Sky Is Innocently Blue"), for career retrospective Kalendarium 1972-93, then using the original backing track.

Blue Virgin Isles was released on CD in 2009, as part of the 8-CD box set Helt Nära Dig - Samlade Album. It was also released as a separate download.

== Track listing ==
Music: Ted Gärdestad, lyrics: Kenneth Gärdestad

Side A:

1. "505 To Casablanca" - 3:49
  - Arranged by Larry Muhoberac
  - Solo: Abe Most, clarinet
2. "Blue Virgin Isles" - 4:57
  - Arranged by James Newton Howard
  - Strings arranged By Gene Page
  - Solo: Jay Graydon, electric guitar
3. "Love, You're Makin' All The Fools" - 3:26
  - Arranged by Jai Winding*
4. "Baby Blue Eyes" - 2:36
  - Arranged by George Tipton
  - Solo: Abe Most, clarinet
5. "Wanna Live - Got To Give" - 4:18
  - Arranged by Gene Page*
  - Solo: Stella Castellucci, harp

Side B:

1. "Take Me Back To Hollywood" - 4:18
  - Original title: "Chapeau-Claque", from 1976 album Franska Kort
  - Arranged by George Tipton
2. "Back In The Business" - 3:48
  - Arranged by Jai Winding*
  - Solo: Jay Graydon, electric guitar
3. "Puddle Of Pain" - 3:18
  - Arranged by Larry Muhoberac
  - Solo: Jim Horn, flute
4. "Love Lies Free" - 4:11
  - Arranged by Jai Winding
  - Solo: Steve Lukather, electric guitar
5. "Just For The Money" - 3:59
  - Arranged by Gene Page*
  - Solos: John Mayall, harmonica and Abe Most, clarinet

=== Additional tracks, 1979 re-release ===
- International editions: "Satellite", track A1.
- Scandinavian edition: "Satellit" (Swedish version), track A1 + "Satellite", track B6.

== Personnel ==
Mostly adapted from Tidal.

- Ted Gärdestad - lead vocals, piano, guitar
- Jeff Porcaro - drums, percussion
- Jim Keltner - drums, percussion, backing vocals
- David Hungate - bass
- Ray Brown - bass
- Bob Glaub - bass
- Jai Winding - bass, keyboards
- Jay Graydon - guitar
- Lee Ritenour - guitar
- Steve Lukather - guitar
- Fred Tackett - guitar
- John Collins - guitar
- Larry Muhoberac - keyboards
- Mike Melvoin - keyboards
- James Newton Howard - keyboards
- Dr. John - keyboards
- Victor Feldman - percussion
- Jerry Williams - percussion
- Hal Blaine - percussion
- Gary Coleman - percussion
- Al Hendrickson - ukulele, banjo
- Steve Porcaro - synthesizer
- Emil Richards - percussion
- John Mayall - harmonica
- Steve Madaio - trumpet
- Bob Fowler - trumpet
- Gene Goe - trumpet
- Jerry Hey - trumpet
- Cappy Lewis - trumpet
- Dick Hyde - trombone
- Tommy Shepard - trombone
- Abe Most - woodwinds
- John Lowe - woodwinds
- Jim Horn - woodwinds
- Buddy Collette - woodwinds
- David Luell - woodwinds
- Ted Nash - woodwinds
- Wilbur Schwartz - woodwinds
- Gary Herbig - woodwinds
- Dave Duke - French horn
- Bob Henderson - French horn
- Harry Bluestone - concert master, strings
- Israel Baker - violin
- Arnold Belnick - violin
- Isabelle Daskoff - violin
- Ron Folsom - violin
- Bill Hymanson - violin
- Anatol Kaminsky - violin
- Jacob Krachmalnick - violin
- Bernie Kundell - violin
- Betty La Magna - violin
- Erno Neufeld - violin
- Don Palmer - violin
- Stan Plummer - violin
- Nat Ross - violin
- Henry Roth - violin
- Jack Shulman - violin
- Marshall Sosson - violin
- Joe Stepansky - violin
- Pam Goldsmith - viola
- Allan Harshman - viola
- Garry Nuttycombe - viola
- Dave Schwartz - viola
- Julianna Buffum - cello
- Jesse Ehrlich - cello
- Armand Kaproff - cello
- Dennis Karmazyn - cello
- Ray Kramer - cello
- Chuck Domanico - double bass
- Arni Egilsson - double bass
- Stella Castellucci - harp
- Jon Joyce - background vocals and clapping
- David Cassidy - background vocals and clapping
- Venetta Fields - background vocals and clapping
- Sherlie Matthews - background vocals and clapping
- Stan Farber - background vocals and clapping
- Jackie Ward - background vocals and clapping
- Mitch Gordon - background vocals and clapping
- Jim Haas - background vocals and clapping
- Jai Winding - background vocals and clapping
- Alix Wangberg - background vocals and clapping
- Tere Mansfield - background vocals and clapping
- John Baylor - background vocals and clapping
- Sally Stevens - background vocals and clapping
- Jean King - background vocals and clapping
- Anita James - background vocals and clapping
- Bill Thedford - background vocals and clapping
- Dr. John - background vocals and clapping

== Production ==
- Produced by Eirik W. Wangberg
- Recorded at: Sounds Labs Inc., Hollywood, Bastun Studios AB, Stockholm, Marcus Music AB, Stockholm, Capitol Studios, Hollywood; KMH Studio AB, Stockholm; Whitney Studios, Glendale, Western Recorders, Hollywood; Hollywood Sound Recorders, Hollywood
- Sound engineers: Eirik W. Wangberg, Ron Hitchcock, Val Garay, Armin Steiner
- Assistant engineers: Linda Tyler, Olle Ramm, Christer Berg, Dennis Cook, Lennart Karlsmyr, Åke Grahn, Cecil Jones, Don Henderson, Bob Mocler, Ed Perry.
- Mastering: Wally Traugott at Capitol Studios, Hollywood
- Musician contractor: Frank DeCaro
- Art direction: David Larkham
- Cover design: David Larkham and Eirik W. Wangberg
- Front & back cover photographs: Yoshi Ohara for Barry Levine Studios
- Inner sleeve photography: Barry Levine & Torbjörn Calvero
- Thank You: Janne Schaffer, Randy Edelman, Thom Rotelia, Ben Benay, Scotty Edwards, Ralph Grierson, Howard Weiss, Peggy Steiner, Annie Street, Virginia Berger, John Sands, Ned Forsythe, Robert Lamoureux, Jon Joyce, Steve Kelman, Mikke Tretow and to Stig Anderson, ABBA, and the Polar family. Special thanks to Alix Wangberg whose cheerful spirit and lyrical talent helped when times were rough and no words were in the air. /TED & KEN

== Personnel and production "Satellit"/"Satellite" ==
- Producers: Janne Schaffer & Ted Gärdestad
- Musicians: Stefan Nilsson, Janne Schaffer, Mike Watson, Roger Palm, Malando Gassama & Lars Samuelsson
- String arrangement: Lars Samuelsson
- Backing vocals: Rose-Marie Gröning, Liza Öhman, Diana Nunez, Lennart Sjöholm & Peter Lundblad
- Recorded at Polar Studios, Stockholm

== Release history ==
- 1978 Polar Music POLS 284 (Scandinavia)
- 1978 RCA Records VPL1 4118 (Australia)
- 1979 Polar Music POLS 300 (Scandinavia, re-release including "Satellit" and "Satellite")
- 1979 Epic Records 83653 (UK, re-release including "Satellite")
- 1979 Polydor Records 2344 121 (West Germany, The Netherlands & Portugal, re-release including "Satellite")
- 1979 Carnaby (Spain, re-release including "Satellite")
- 1979 Discomate DSP 5111 (Japan, re-release including "Satellite")

== Charts ==
Chart (1978)	Peak position
Swedish Albums (Sverigetopplistan)	29

== External links and sources ==
- Eirik Wangberg's official site.
- Detailed Ted Gärdestad discography
- Artist Direct biography
- MSN Music biography
- Allmusic biography and discography
