= Satellit =

1979 single by Ted Gärdestad

Single by Ted Gärdestad
- B-side: "Blue Virgin Isles"
- Released: 1979
- Recorded: 1979
- Studio: Polar Studios, Stockholm
- Genre: Pop, soft rock
- Length: 4:12
- Label: Polar
- Songwriters: Kenneth Gärdestad; Ted Gärdestad
- Producers: Janne Schaffer; Ted Gärdestad

Ted Gärdestad singles chronology
"Chapeau-Claque" (1976)	"Satellit" (1979)	"Låt solen värma dig" (1980)

(Sweden) "Satellit"

Eurovision Song Contest 1979 entry
- Country: Sweden
- Artist: Ted Gärdestad
- Language: Swedish
- Composer: Ted Gärdestad
- Lyricist: Kenneth Gärdestad
- Conductor: Lars Samuelson

Finals performance
- Final result: 17th
- Final points: 8

Entry chronology
- ◄ "Det blir alltid värre framåt natten" (1978)
- "Just nu!" (1980) ►

"Satellit" (Swedish pronunciation: [satɛˈliːt]), known in English as "Satellite", is a soft rock song written by Swedish composer and singer Ted Gärdestad and lyricist Kenneth Gärdestad. Originally performed by Ted, the song was performed in its native language as the Swedish entry in the Eurovision Song Contest 1979, finishing in 17th place.

== Background ==
Ted Gärdestad produced his first four albums together with Benny Andersson and Björn Ulvaeus of ABBA, which featured backing vocals by Agnetha Fältskog and Anni-Frid Lyngstad, and were released on the record label Polar. Ted, along with his elder brother and lyricist Kenneth, had previously competed in Melodifestivalen, the Swedish pre-selections, three times before winning; in 1973 with "Oh, vilken härlig dag", finishing in fourth place, in 1975 with "Rockin' 'n' Reelin'", finishing in seventh place, and in 1977 when he and brother Kenneth wrote Lena Andersson's entry "Det bästa som finns", which finished in eighth place.

== Song production ==
The midtempo rock track, originally composed with English lyrics, has a chorus that starts with "I feel like a satellite, high in the sky, and now I understand how small the world really is" and the verses include phrases like "just like the earth and the moon we're attracted to each other" and "when the sun sets I really need your warmth". The song, arranged and produced by guitarist Janne Schaffer, features a guitar and bass riff influenced by Toto's 1978 hit "Hold the Line".

During a recording session in Los Angeles, California for Gärdestad's 1978 studio album Blue Virgin Isles, four of the band members, Jeff Porcaro, Steve Porcaro, David Hungate and Steve Lukather were present in the session when Janne Schaffer heard the quartet experiment with the riffs that would evolve into "Hold the Line". Schaffer was inspired by the session, which led to his arrangement for Gärdestad's song "Satellit". Due to the perceived similarities between "Satellit" and "Hold the Line", Gärdestad's song caused disputes over the qualification for the Eurovision Song Contest. In February 1979, during an Aftonbladet interview with Jeff Porcaro, Porcaro denied the notion of Gärdestad's song being a rip-off of "Hold the Line": "No, it's not a rip-off, Ted did not steal our song. Those piano triplets and that bass and guitar line go back to the 1950s and the fact that we both have happened to use variations on the same theme in our songs right now is purely coincidental.

Both the English language and the Swedish language versions of "Satellit" were recorded at Polar Studios, Stockholm in 1979. The English-language version of the track, "Satellite", was included on subsequent editions of the album, which was issued in both Europe, Australasia and Japan.

== Personnel ==
Personnel per liner notes of 1979 Epic Records reissue of Blue Virgin Isles.

- Ted Gärdestad – lead vocals, backing vocals, producer
- Stefan Nilsson – piano, keyboards
- Janne Schaffer – guitars, producer, arranger
- Mike Watson – bass guitar
- Roger Palm – drums, percussion
- Malando Gassama – percussion
- Lars Samuelsson – string arrangement
- Rose-Marie Gröning – backing vocals
- Liza Öhman – backing vocals
- Diana Nunez – backing vocals
- Lennart Sjöholm – backing vocals
- Peter Lundblad – backing vocals

== Eurovision performance ==
The song was performed as entry number fifteen on the night, following Netherlands' Xandra with "Colorado" and preceding Norway's Anita Skorgan with "Oliver". At the close of voting, it had received 8 points, placing it 17th in a field of 19, making it Sweden's second lowest placing in the contest at that point in time. Despite this the song counts as one of Gärdestad's signature tunes, the Swedish version of the song was a Top 10 hit on the singles chart and it also spent two weeks on the Svensktoppen radio chart.

=== Aftermath ===
Gärdestad returned to Melodifestivalen the following year with "Låt solen värma dig" ("Let The Sun Warm You"), sung as a duet with then girlfriend Annica Boller. The song finished fifth in the pre-selections and "Satellit" was succeeded as Sweden in the Eurovision Song Contest at the 1980 contest by Tomas Ledin with "Just nu!". An English language solo version of "Låt solen värma dig", entitled "Let The Sun Shine Through", was included on Gärdestad's second international album I'd Rather Write a Symphony and a Swedish solo version on 1981's Stormvarning.

== Charts ==
Chart (1979)	Peak position
Sweden (Sverigetopplistan)	10

== Sources ==
- Gärdestad, Kenneth; Liimatainen, Keijo (2005). Jag vill ha en egen måne: boken om Ted Gärdestad (in Swedish). Stockholm: Forum. ISBN 91-37-12733-0. SELIBR 9876123.
