= För kärlekens skull =

Single by Ted Gärdestad

from the album Kalendarium 1972-93
- A-side: "För kärlekens skull"
- B-side: "Låt kärleken slå rot"
- Released: 1993
- Genre: Swedish pop
- Label: Polar
- Songwriter(s): Kenneth Gärdestad; Ted Gärdestad

För kärlekens skull singles chronology
"Himlen är oskyldigt blå" (1993)	"För kärlekens skull" (1993)	"Ge en sol" (1994)

"För kärlekens skull" is a song with springtime references, written by Kenneth Gärdestad and Ted Gärdestad, and originally recorded by Ted Gärdestad in 1993. This recording charted at Svensktoppen for nine weeks between 16 May-10 July 1993, peaking at second position. The song has also been recorded by Christer Sjögren (2003), Lotta Engberg 2005), Erik Linder (2009) and Helen Sjöholm.
