= Gärdestad =

Gärdestad is a Swedish surname. Notable people with the surname include:

- Kenneth Gärdestad (1948–2018), Swedish songwriter
- Ted Gärdestad (1956–1997), Swedish singer, songwriter, musician, and actor known internationally as Ted
