= Undringar =

Studio album by Ted Gärdestad
- Released: 31 January 1972
- Recorded: October – December 1971
- Studios: Metronome, Stockholm, Sweden
- Genre: Pop
- Length: 36:29
- Label: Polar
- Producers: Benny Andersson, Björn Ulvaeus

Ted Gärdestad chronology
Undringar (1972)	Ted (1973)

Professional ratings
Review scores
Source	Rating
Allmusic	link

Undringar is the debut studio album from Swedish singer/songwriter Ted Gärdestad, released in early 1972 by Polar Music. It contains his breakthrough single "Jag vill ha en egen måne" as well as "Hela världen runt", "När du kommer" and "Snurra du min värld". In 1991, the album was released on CD.

== Production ==
Recording for Undringar started on 27 October 1971 at Metronome Studio, Stockholm. The sessions concluded by December 1971. The album was produced by Benny Andersson and Björn Ulvaeus, engineered by Michael B. Tretow and features uncredited vocals by Agnetha Fältskog and Anni-Frid Lyngstad.

== Track listing ==
Music by Ted Gärdestad, lyrics by Kenneth Gärdestad.

Side A:

1. "Helena" – 3:19
2. "Sommarlängtan" – 2:37
3. "Jag vill ha en egen måne" – 3:17
4. "Räcker jag till" – 3:00
5. "Ett stilla regn" – 3:26
6. "När du kommer" – 2:47

Side B:

1. "Snurra du min värld" – 2:59
2. "Så mycket bättre" – 3:54
3. "Hela världen runt" – 2:41
4. "I dröm och fantasi" – 4:05
5. "Beat It, Girl" – 4:34

== Personnel ==
Musicians

- Ted Gärdestad – lead vocals, guitar
- Benny Andersson – piano, backing vocals
- Björn Ulvaeus – acoustic guitar, backing vocals
- Janne Schaffer – acoustic guitar, electric guitar
- Mike Watson – bass guitar
- Ola Brunkert – drums
- Agnetha Fältskog – backing vocals
- Anni-Frid Lyngstad – backing vocals
- Lena Andersson – backing vocals ("Helena")

Production

- Benny Andersson – producer
- Björn Ulvaeus – producer
- Michael B. Tretow – sound engineer
- Rune Persson – sound engineer
- Åke Eldsäter – sound engineer
- Recorded at Metronome Studios, Stockholm
- Originally released as Polar POLS 234, 1972.

== Charts ==
Chart (1972)	Peak position
Sweden (Kvällstoppen)	1
