= Stormvarning =

Studio album by Ted Gärdestad
- Released: 31 January 1981
- Recorded: 1980–1981
- Studio: Polar, Stockholm, Sweden
- Genre: Pop
- Length: 46:57
- Label: Polar (original release); Universal Music Group
- Producer: Ted Gärdestad; Lennart Östlund; Benny Andersson; Michael B. Tretow

Ted Gärdestad chronology
I'd Rather Write a Symphony (1980)	Stormvarning (1981)	Kalendarium 1972–93 (1993)

Professional ratings
Review scores
Source	Rating
AllMusic	link

Stormvarning (Gale Warning) is the seventh studio album by Swedish singer/songwriter Ted Gärdestad, released on the Polar Music label in Sweden in early 1981. Stormvarning was an expanded and partly re-recorded version of the international album I'd Rather Write a Symphony, released in West Germany and the Netherlands in 1980.

The album includes a solo version of the 1980 Melodifestivalen entry "Låt Solen Värma Dig", originally a duet with Rock De Luxe vocalist Annica Boller, Gärdestad's girlfriend at the time. The duet version remains unreleased on CD.

The Stormvarning album also features the track that was to be Gärdestad's final hit single of the 1980s, "Låt Kärleken Slå Rot", produced by Benny Andersson and featuring Anni-Frid Lyngstad on backing vocals.

== Track listing ==
All lyrics written by Kenneth Gärdestad, music by Ted Gärdestad

Side A:

1. "Låt Kärleken Slå Rot" - 4:48
2. "Stormvarning!" ("Mindblower") - 4:23
3. "Don't Treat Me This Way" - 3:27
4. "Slingan" - 1:51
5. "You Got Me Dancing" - 4:04
6. "The Reason" - 4:43

Side B:

1. "Ingen Annan Än Du" - 3:30
2. "Låt Solen Värma Dig" (Solo version) - 3:33
3. "How Do You Wanna Make Love" - 3:25
4. "It's You" - 5:21
5. "Down at the Zoo" (Alternate version) - 3:55
6. "Orättvisan" - 3:57

== Personnel ==
- Ted Gärdestad - lead vocals, acoustic guitar, piano, keyboards, cymbals, strata
- Benny Andersson - synthesizers, piano, keyboards ("Låt Kärleken Slå Rot")
- Janne Schaffer - guitars
- Lasse Wellander - guitars
- Kjell Öhman - piano
- Björn J:son Lindh - piano, string arrangements
- Per-Erik Hallin - piano
- Wlodek Gulgowski - piano
- Rutger Gunnarsson - bass guitar
- Stefan Brolund - bass guitar
- Mike Watson - bass guitar
- Sam Bengtsson - bass guitar
- Åke Sundqvist - drums
- Per Lindvall - drums
- Ola Brunkert - drums
- Lennart Östlund - strata
- Ulf Andersson - saxophone
- Tomas Ledin - backing vocals
- Mikael Rickfors - backing vocals
- Annica Boller - backing vocals
- Diana Nunez - backing vocals
- Maritza Horn - backing vocals
- Liza Öhman - backing vocals
- Py Bäckman - backing vocals
- Agneta Olsson - backing vocals
- Lasse Westman - backing vocals
- Anni-Frid Lyngstad - backing vocals ("Låt Kärleken Slå Rot")
- Lennart Sjödin - backing vocals ("Låt Kärleken Slå Rot")

== Production ==
- Ted Gärdestad - producer
- Lennart Östlund - producer
- Benny Andersson - producer ("Låt Kärleken Slå Rot")
- Michael B. Tretow - producer ("Orättvisan")
- Leif Mases - sound engineer
- Lennart Östlund - sound engineer
- Recorded at Polar Studios, Stockholm
- Originally released as Polar POLS 310, 1981

== Charts ==
Chart (1981)	Peak position
Swedish Albums (Sverigetopplistan)	31

== Other sources and external links ==
- Official home page, The Ted Gärdestad Society
- Liner notes Stormvarning, Ted Gärdestad, Polar Music POLS 310, 1981.
- Allmusic.com entry, Stormvarning, Ted Gärdestad, 1981
