= Malando Gassama =

- Gassama in 1976

Background information
- Birth name: Malang Omar Gassam
- Born: 7 February 1946; The Gambia
- Died: 25 January 1999 (aged 52); The Gambia
- Instrument(s): Percussion, drums
- Years active: 1967–1999

Malando Gassama (born Malang Omar Gassam; 7 February 1946 – 25 January 1999) was a Gambian percussionist who spent most of his music career in Sweden. He recorded and performed with many notable Swedish and international artists such as ABBA, Al Jarreau, Anni-Frid Lyngstad (of ABBA), Ted Gärdestad, Bette Midler, Gábor Szabó, Janne Schaffer, David Sanborn, Viktoria Tolstoy, Jaco Pastorius, and Blacknuss Allstars, etc. He was one of the backup musicians on ABBA - the Movie and was featured on documentaries which aired on Swedish television and radio. His last concert appearance was with Bob Manning's Soul Enterprise at Fasching Jazz Club in Stockholm. He died 2 weeks later in Gambia.

== Recordings ==
1960s

- Viva Super Eagles, The Super Eagles, 1969

1970s

- Baltik, Baltik, 1973
- Waterloo, ABBA, 1974
- Cozy Square, RESA (Swedish jazz band; formed 1972), 1974
- Frida ensam ("Frida Alone"), Anni-Frid Lyngstad, 1975
- Don't Give a Damn, Monica Törnell, 1975
- Franska Kort, Ted Gärdestad, 1976
- Arrival, ABBA, 1976
- Upptåg, Ted Gärdestad, 1976
- The Album, ABBA, 1977
- Pugh Rogefeldt, Bamalama, 1977
- Blue Virgin Isles, Ted Gärdestad, 1978
- Voulez-Vous, ABBA, 1979
- Greatest Hits Vol. 2 (compilation album), ABBA, 1979

1980s

- As We Speak, David Sanborn, 1981
- The Singles: The First Ten Years, ABBA, 1982
- No Frills, Bette Midler, 1983
- In London (live at the Wembley), Al Jarreau, 1984
- ABBA Live, ABBA, 1986
- Monica Z, Monica Zetterlund, 1989

1990s–2000

- Montreux Jazz Festival 25th Anniversary, Various Artists 1991
- Experience The Divine Bette Midler, 1993
- En Salig man, Svante Thuresson, 1993
- Thank You For The Music, ABBA, 1994
- Home to Me, Eric Bibb, 2000

Various years

- The Very Best of ABBA, ABBA
- ABBA Box, ABBA
- Originals, ABBA
- Ablution, Ablution
- Me to You, Eric Bibb
- Gold: A Decade Of Soul, Jazz & R&B, Blacknuss
- Efter Midnatt, Tommy Broman
- Carte Postale, Francis Cabrel
- African Suite, Berndt Egerbladh
- Jungle Wave, Eleanor
- Irish Coffee / No Violence, Mats Glenngård
- Violin Race, Mats Glenngård
- Smile, Harpo
- Eskimo Heat, Häxmjölk
- Balsam, Merit Hemmingson
- Family, Joe Higgs
- Veckans Affärer, John Holm
- Söndag I Sängen, Bo Kaspers Orkester
- Ut På Stan, Tomas Ledin
- Cous Cous, Björn J:son Lindh
- Boogie Woogie, Björn Jayson Lindh
- Raggie, Björn Jayson Lindh
- Bike Voyage II, Björn Jayson Lindh
- Second Carneval, Björn Jayson Lindh
- Jayson Lindh, Björn Jayson Lindh
- Day At The Surface, Björn Jayson Lindh (Björn J:son Lindh)
- Påtalåtar, Ola Magnell
- No Frills, Bette Midler
- Divine Collection, Bette Midler
- Indestructible, Lisa Nilsson
- Till Morelia, Lisa Nilsson
- Genomskådad, Ingemar Olsson
- Janne Schaffer, Janne Schaffer
- Andra LP, Janne Schaffer
- The Chinese, Janne Schaffer
- Second Album, Janne Schaffer
- Katharsis, Janne Schaffer
- Earmeal, Janne Schaffer
- Traffic, Janne Schaffer
- Överblick, Janne Schaffer
- Finn, Finn Sjöberg
- Skifs Hits, Björn Skifs
- Vår Om Du Vill, Björn Skifs
- Belsta River, Gabor Szabo
- In Stockholm, Gabor Szabo
- Bits & Pieces, Eje Thelin
- För Älskad, Viktoria Tolstoy
- Don't Give A Damn, Monica Törnell
- A La Carte, Triumvirat
- Rainbow, Al Vizzutti
- Wellander & Ronander, Wellander & Ronander
