= Himlen är oskyldigt blå =

Himlen är oskyldigt blå may refer to:

- Blue Virgin Isles (song)
- Behind Blue Skies, 2010 Swedish film
