= I'd Rather Write a Symphony =

I'd Rather Write A Symphony

Studio album by Ted Gärdestad
- Released: 30 September 1980
- Recorded: 1980
- Studio: Polar, Stockholm, Sweden
- Genre: Pop
- Label: Polydor
- Producer: Ted Gärdestad; Lennart Östlund

Ted Gärdestad chronology
Blue Virgin Isles (1978)	I'd Rather Write A Symphony (1980)	Stormvarning (1981)

I'd Rather Write A Symphony is the sixth studio album and the second international release from Swedish singer/songwriter Ted Gärdestad. It was released in 1980 through the Polydor label in West Germany and The Netherlands, promoted by the single "Don't Treat Me This Way" backed with "Mindblower". An expanded and partly re-recorded version of the album was released as Stormvarning on the Polar Music label in Sweden the following year, the track "Love Light" is however only available on the international edition.

Two unreleased songs from the album sessions, the title track and "Nobody Loves You Now" saw their debut 20 years later as part of the 2001 4 CD box set Solregn.

I'd Rather Write A Symphony in its entirety remains unreleased on CD. However, all tracks are included in the 2009 8-CD box set Helt Nära Dig - Samlade Album.

== Track listing ==
All lyrics written by Kenneth Gärdestad, music by Ted Gärdestad

Side A:

1. "Mindblower" ("Stormvarning")
2. "Don't Treat Me This Way"
3. "You Got Me Dancing"
4. "How Do You Wanna Make Love"
5. "The Reason"

Side B:

1. "Let the Sun Shine Through" ("Låt Solen Värma Dig")
2. "It's You"
3. "Love Light"
4. "Slingan"
5. "Down at the Zoo"

== Personnel ==
- Ted Gärdestad - lead vocals, acoustic guitar, piano, keyboards, cymbals, strata
- Janne Schaffer - guitars
- Lasse Wellander - guitars
- Kjell Öhman - piano
- Björn J:son Lindh - piano, string arrangements
- Per-Erik Hallin - piano
- Wlodek Gulgowski - piano
- Rutger Gunnarsson - bass guitar
- Stefan Brolund - bass guitar
- Mike Watson - bass guitar
- Sam Bengtsson - bass guitar
- Åke Sundqvist - drums
- Per Lindvall - drums
- Ola Brunkert - drums
- Lennart Östlund - strata
- Ulf Andersson - saxophone
- Tomas Ledin - backing vocals
- Mikael Rickfors - backing vocals
- Annica Boller - backing vocals
- Diana Nunez - backing vocals
- Maritza Horn - backing vocals
- Liza Öhman - backing vocals
- Py Bäckman - backing vocals
- Agneta Olsson - backing vocals
- Lasse Westman - backing vocals

== Production ==
- Ted Gärdestad - producer
- Lennart Östlund - producer
- Janne Schaffer - producer
- Leif Mases - sound engineer
- Lennart Östlund - sound engineer
- Recorded at Polar Studios, Stockholm

== Release history ==
- Polydor Records 2344 164, (West Germany & The Netherlands), 1980

== Sources and external links ==
- Official home page, The Ted Gärdestad Society
- Liner notes I'd Rather Write A Symphony, Ted Gärdestad, Polydor 2344 164, 1980.
