= Caramba (band) =

Swedish novelty music group

Studio album by Caramba
- Released: 1981
- Recorded: 1981
- Genres: Pop music, Comedy
- Length: 35:46
- Label: Trash Records TRASLP 1
- Producer: Michael B. Tretow

Caramba was a Swedish novelty music group. They released one self-titled album in 1981, with the single "Hubba Hubba Zoot Zoot" peaking at number 1 in Sweden. The album is chiefly notable due to the entire album being recorded in nonsense language. The songs are made to sound like certain styles of music by imitating the phonemic structure of languages from the appropriate regions. The album was produced by Michael B. Tretow, who is primarily famous for engineering ABBA's records, and featured vocals by another Polar Music artist, Ted Gärdestad. A number of other noted Swedish musicians and singers were rumoured to have taken part in the Caramba recordings, but Tretow confirmed in an interview in 2015 that he and Gärdestad were the primary artists. Roger Palm, the drummer for ABBA, played drums on "Hubba Hubba Zoot Zoot" and Kalle Sändare, a Swedish comedian known for his prank calls, was involved on the track "Ahllo", according to Tretow.

The track "Hubba Hubba Zoot Zoot" has been re-issued as part of Michael B. Tretow's 1999 album Greatest Hits, the Ted Gärdestad four-CD box set Solregn in 2001, and a number of other compilations of 1980s hits and Swedish novelty recordings, and the Caramba album was released on CD in 2011.

The specific phrase "Hubba Hubba Zoot" seems to have a precedent going back at least to the mid-1940s, as heard in the 1946 Spike Jones recording "Hawaiian War Chant" at about 1 minutes 45 seconds.

== Members of the group ==
The artists of Caramba all used pseudonyms. This is how they were credited on the album sleeve:

- Carlos Ih Lura, ahllo
- Zoltan Zull, violotta
- Dr. Fritz Höfner, baribasso
- Tudor Ludor, batterie
- Abdullah Presley, tomba
- Zingo Allah, prutto
- Ihto Amin, paahuve
- Gaston El Ton Yon, pianissimo
- King Nam, a nam
- Clapton Combo, gitaronimo
- King Kong, tango
- Hazze Kamikaze, teknico del son
- Giorgio Martini, producto

== Production ==
- Recordeli pour Studio Garage De Garbage
- Picturella par Bengto Hoo
- Coloretta par cartong: Torsk Prod

== Track listing ==
Blaztah 1 (Side 1)

1. "Ali Baba" – 3:51
2. "Spottnjik" – 3:51
3. "Hubba Hubba Zoot Zoot" – 3:23
4. "Eine Feine" – 3:43
5. "Fido" – 3:47

Blaztah A (Side A)

1. "Aitho" – 3:28
2. "Anna Kapoe" – 4:17
3. "Donna Maya" – 3:07
4. "Ahllo" – 2:42
5. "Carhumba" – 3:37

== Influences on culture ==
The "Hubba Hubba Zoot Zoot" track was parodied in the UK on a Quakers Harvest Crunch cereal ad, with the tag line of Hubba Hubba Yum Yum.

The track "Fido" was slightly reworked by Caramba, named "Fedora" and used in an advertising campaign for Kia-Ora throughout the early 1980s. This version was released as a single on the "Billco" label (BILL 101) in 1983 titled "Fedora (I'll be your dawg)" – Caramba (B side "Ralph and Rolph"). It reached No. 56 on the U.K. singles chart.

== See also ==
- ABBA
- Michael B. Tretow
- Ted Gärdestad
