= Oh, vilken härlig dag =

1973 Ted Gärdestad song

"Oh, vilken härlig da'"

Single by Ted Gärdestad

from the album Ted
- A-side: "Oh, vilken härlig da'"
- B-side: "Sol, vind och vatten"
- Released: February 1973
- Label: Polar
- Songwriters: Kenneth Gärdestad and Ted Gärdestad

Ted Gärdestad singles chronology
"Jag ska fånga en ängel" (1973)	"Oh, vilken härlig da'" (1973)	"Eiffeltornet" (1974)

"Oh, vilken härlig dag" is a song written by Kenneth Gärdestad and Ted Gärdestad, and performed by the latter at Melodifestivalen 1973 where the song ended up 4th. The song was released as a single in February 1973, as well as the 1973 album Ted. The song entered Svensktoppen on 15 April 1973, reaching 10th position, before ending up knocked out of chart the upcoming week.

In July–August 2004, Jill Johnson scored a cover hit with the song, after the single was released on 30 April 2004, with an instrumental song as B-side, peaking at 37th position at the Swedish singles chart. This recording has been used in a commercial for the beer label Pripps.

== Single track listing ==
=== Jill Johnson ===
1. Oh, vilken härlig dag - 3:46
2. Oh, vilken härlig dag (instrumental version) - 3:45

== Charts ==
Chart (2002)	Peak position
Sweden (Sverigetopplistan)	37
