= Peter Viitanen =

Swedish actor

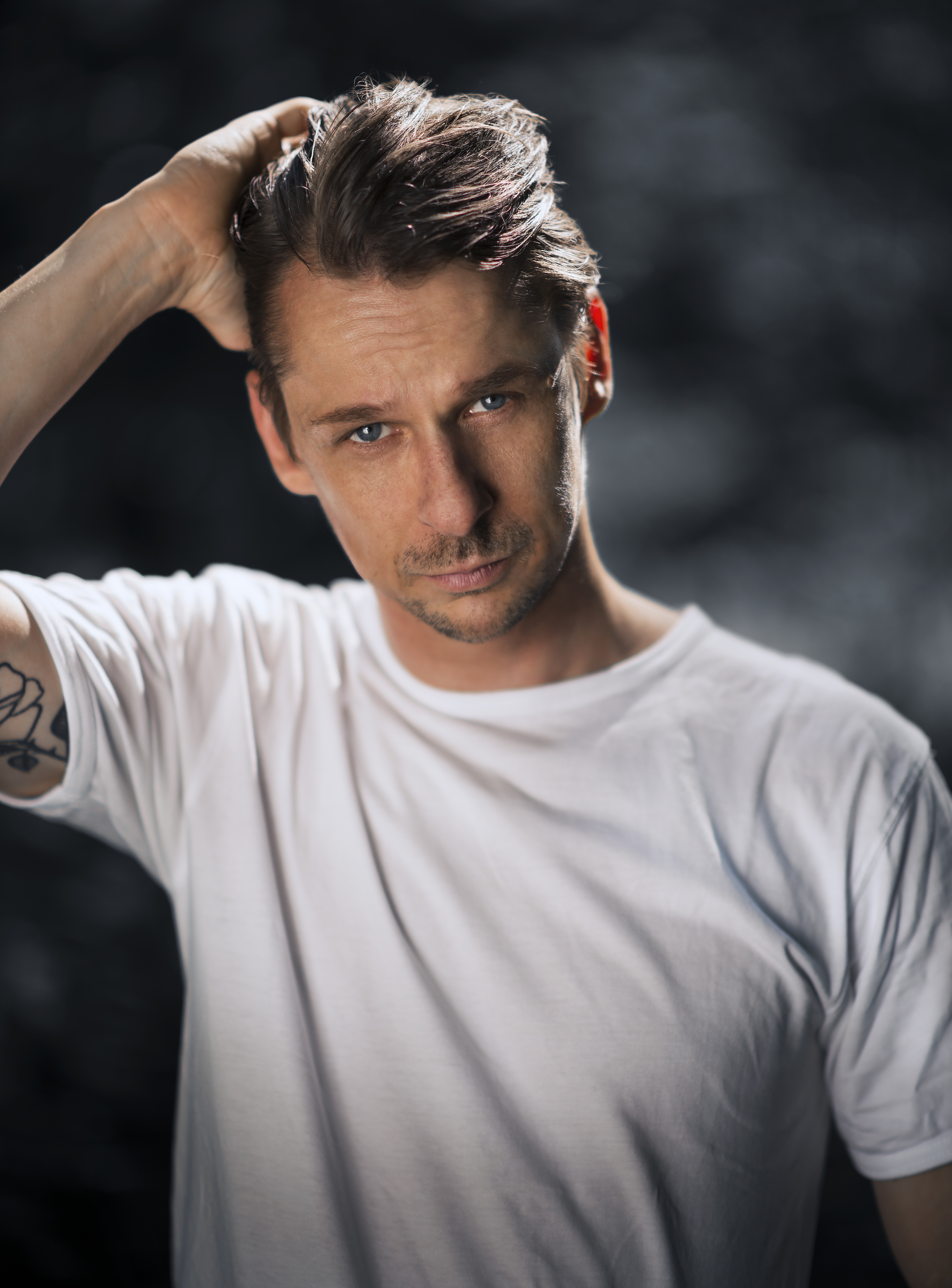
Peter Viitanen

Peter Rainer Zakarias Viitanen (born 21 February 1980, in Stockholm) is a Swedish actor. He is best known for his role as Kenneth Gärdestad in the film Ted: För kärlekens skull. Viitanen is a second-generation Sweden Finn and speaks Finnish with his family.

== Filmography ==
- 1993 – Kådisbellan
- 1994 – Sixten
- 1995 – Majken (TV-series)
- 1996 – Kloak (TV-series)
- 1996 – Pin up
- 1996 – Skuggornas hus (TV-series)
- 1998 – Längtans blåa blomma (TV-series)
- 1998 – Pip-Larssons (TV-series)
- 2000 – En klass för sig (TV-series)
- 2000 – Judith (TV-series)
- 2000 – Hotel Seger (TV-series)
- 2002 – Skattkammarplaneten
- 2002 – Skeppsholmen (TV-series)
- 2004 – Fröken Sverige
- 2004 – Lokalreportern (TV-series)
- 2004 – Orka! Orka! (TV-series)
- 2005 – Kocken
- 2005 – Vinnare och förlorare
- 2005 – Kim Novak badade aldrig i Genesarets sjö
- 2005 – Lovisa och Carl Michael (TV-series)
- 2006 – Tusenbröder – Återkomsten
- 2006 – Mästerverket (TV-series)
- 2007 – Leende guldbruna ögon (TV-series)
- 2008 – Oskyldigt dömd (TV-series)
- 2009 – 183 dagar (TV-series)
- 2009 – Wallander – Skytten
- 2010 – Bröderna Jaukka
- 2012–2014 – Äkta människor (TV-series)
- 2013 – Mördaren ljuger inte ensam
- 2015 – Tjuvheder
- 2015 – Vitt skräp
- 2018 – Ted: För kärlekens skull
- 2018 – Sthlm Rekviem (TV-series)
- 2019 – Vår tid är nu (TV-series)
- 2019 – Miniräknarna (TV-series)
- 2020 – Lassemajas Detektivbyrå - Tågrånarens Hemlighet
- 2020 – Den längsta dagen
- 2021 – Vitt skräp
- 2021 – The Unlikely Murderer (TV-series)
- 2022 – Clark (TV-series)
- 2022 – Försvunna människor (TV-series)
- 2022 – Atonement
- 2023 – Top Dog (TV-series)
- 2024 – Ronja Rövardotter (TV-series)
- 2025 – Morden i Sandhamn (TV-series)
