= Cellofan – med døden til følge =

- Directed by: Eva Isaksen
- Written by: Leidulv Risan
- Starring: Andrine Sæther; Sverre Anker Ousdal
- Music by: Björn J:son Lindh
- Release date: 28 August 1998
- Running time: 90 minutes
- Country: Norway
- Language: Norwegian

Cellofan – med døden til følge (English: Cellophan) is a 1998 Norwegian crime film directed by Eva Isaksen, starring Andrine Sæther and Sverre Anker Ousdal. The young journalist Marianne Hovden (Sæther) is instructed by her father on his deathbed to burn a box of letters hidden in his attic. Defying his wish, she reads the letters, where he is accused of the murder of a young woman 25 years ago. Convinced of her father's innocence, she travels to the small village where the murder took place, to solve the mystery.
