= Sol, vind och vatten =

Single by Lena Andersson
- B-side: "Nu kommer kvällen"
- Released: October 1972
- Genre: Schlager, vispop
- Label: Polar
- Songwriters: Kenneth Gärdestad; Ted Gärdestad
- Producers: Benny Andersson; Björn Ulvaeus; Stig Anderson

Lena Andersson singles chronology
| "Better to Have Loved (Than Never Loved at All)" (1971) | "Sol, vind och vatten" (1972) | "Söderjäntans söndag" (1972) |

Sol, vind och vatten (Swedish: [ˈsuːl ˈvɪnːd ɔ ˈvǎtːɛn], "Sun, wind and water") is a song written by Swedish lyricist Kenneth Gärdestad and composer Ted Gärdestad. First recorded by Lena Andersson, the song was released as a single in October 1972. Ted Gärdestad recorded the song for his 1973 album Ted.

== Context ==
By the second verse, the birth of Jesus is apparent, but in Sweden the song is strongly associated with the summertime and not Christmastime. Many people interpret dig "you" as a human being, and not God or Jesus.

Later during the 1970s, 1980s and early 1990s, the term Sol, vind och vatten' became associated with the issue of energy politics, with protests against nuclear power yelling:

- -Vad skall väck? -Barsebäck! (-What shall be gone? -Barsebäck!)
- -Vad skall in? -Sol och vind! (-What shall come in? - Sun and wind!)

A Framåt fredag version, written by Peter Sundblad and Lars Gunnar Övermyr, was also called Sol, vind & vatten, but actually had an energy political theme.

== Publication ==
- Barnens svenska sångbok, 1999, under the lines "Gladsång och poplåt"

== Charts ==
| Chart (2022) | Peak position |
|---|---|
| Sweden (Sverigetopplistan) | 6 |
