= Michael B. Tretow =

Swedish record producer and audio engineer (1944–2025)

- Born: Bo Michael Tretow; 20 August 1944; Norrköping, Sweden
- Died: 20 May 2025 (aged 80)
- Genres: Pop; rock; schlager
- Occupations: Record producer; audio engineer; musician; composer
- Years active: 1960s–2015
- Labels: Polar; Metal; Polydor; Atlantic; Universal; Epic; Vogue; RCA; PolyGram; Sunshine (Rhodesia/Zimbabwe); Ariston/Dig It (Italy)

Bo Michael Tretow (20 August 1944 – 20 May 2025) was a Swedish record producer and audio engineer, musician, and composer, best known for his work with the Swedish pop group ABBA (1972–1982), and with the musical Chess. He also composed several themes and jingles for Swedish national radio and television.

Tretow was born in Norrköping. He began working at Metronome Studios in Stockholm in 1967. In 1970 he started working in earnest with Björn Ulvaeus and Benny Andersson and the three men got on well together. He later worked at GLN (Glenmark) studios for two years before coming to ABBA's Polar Studios in 1978, where he eventually became studio manager. Tretow experimented with different recording techniques, and played an essential part in creating the "ABBA sound".

Tretow died on 20 May 2025, at the age of 80, his son Rasmus Tretow and his wife Malin Hertzman confirmed to Swedish newspaper Aftonbladet. All four members of the band paid tribute to Tretow, with Benny Andersson saying: "You meant more to us four in ABBA than anyone else... I hope and believe that you felt it throughout all the years that have passed since we worked (and continuously laughed) in the studio. Our music lives on, it seems, and you are the one who made it timeless. You were a fantastic inspirer and joy-maker. And the finest sound engineer the world has ever seen."

== Discography ==
=== As an artist ===
- Mikael & Michael (1966, with Mikael Ramel)
- Let's boogie (1976)
- Caramba (1981, with Ted Gärdestad)
- Michael B. Tretow (1982)
- Tomteland (1985)
- Den makalösa manicken (1986, under the pseudonym Professorn)
- Hystereo Hi-lites (1989)
- Trafik-Trolle (early 1990s)
- Greatest Hits (1999)

=== As producer ===
- Lena Andersson: Det Bästa Som Finns (1977)
- ABBA: Gracias Por La Música (1980)
- ABBA: ABBA Live (1986)
- Big Money: Lost In Hollywood (1992)
- Big Money: Moonraker (1994)

=== As engineer ===
- Agnetha Fältskog: Agnetha Fältskog Vol. 2 (1969)
- Björn Ulvaeus & Benny Andersson: Lycka (1970)
- Agnetha Fältskog: Som jag är (1970)
- Lena Andersson: Lena 15 (1971)
- Lena Andersson: Lena (1971)
- Agnetha Fältskog: När en vacker tanke blir en sång (1975)
- Ted Gärdestad: Undringar (1972)
- Lena Andersson: 12 Nya Visor (1972)
- Björn & Benny, Agnetha & Frida (ABBA): Ring Ring (1972–1973)
- Ted Gärdestad: Ted (1973)
- Svenne & Lotta: Oldies But Goodies (1973)
- ABBA (Björn & Benny, Agnetha & Frida): Waterloo (1974)
- Ted Gärdestad: Upptåg (1974)
- Svenne & Lotta: 2/Bang-A-Boomerang (1975, engineer and co-producer)
- ABBA: ABBA (1975)
- ABBA: Greatest Hits (1975–1976)
- Agnetha Fältskog: Elva kvinnor i ett hus (1975)
- Anni-Frid Lyngstad: Frida ensam (1975)
- ABBA: Arrival (1976)
- Ted Gärdestad: Franska Kort (1976, engineer and co-producer)
- Svenne & Lotta: Letters (1976, engineer and co-producer)
- ABBA: The Album (1977)
- ABBA: Voulez-Vous (1979)
- ABBA: Greatest Hits Vol. 2 (1979)
- ABBA: Super Trouper (1980)
- Ted Gärdestad: I'd Rather Write a Symphony (1980, engineer and co-producer)
- Agnetha & Linda: Nu Tändas Tusen Juleljus (1980/1981, engineer and co-producer)
- ABBA: The Visitors (1981)
- Ted Gärdestad: Stormvarning (1981, engineer and co-producer)
- ABBA: The Singles: The First Ten Years (1982)
- Agnetha Fältskog: Wrap Your Arms Around Me (1983)
- Various Artists: Original Cast Recording, Musical Chess (1984)
- Agnetha Fältskog: Eyes of a Woman (1985)
- Gemini: Gemini (1985)
- Agnetha & Christian: Kom följ med i vår karusell (1987, engineer and co-producer)
- Gemini: Geminism (1987)
- ABBA: ABBA Gold: Greatest Hits (1992)
- ABBA: More ABBA Gold: More ABBA Hits (1993)
- ABBA: Thank You For The Music (1994)
