= Ann Zacharias =

Swedish actress (born 1956)

- Born: Anne Zezette Zacharias; 19 September 1956 (age 69); Stockholm, Sweden
- Occupation: Actress
- Years active: 1971-1988
- Spouse: Sven-Bertil Taube (m. 1975–1975) Christer Bredbacka (m. 1988–1992)
- Children: 4, including Sascha Zacharias

Ann Zacharias (born 19 September 1956) is a Swedish actress, model, director, screenwriter and author . She appeared in fifteen films and television shows between 1971 and 1988. She is the mother of Swedish actress Sascha Zacharias.

She married Sven-Bertil Taube in 1975, divorced the same year, but had a daughter with him, Sascha Zacharias, who is also an actor, in 1979. She later cohabited with Ted Gärdestad and they had children Sara Zacharias (born 1982) and Marc Zacharias (born 1983; practiced ultra-Orthodox Judaism for a while under the name Moishe Zacharevsky). Between 1988 and 1992, she was married to consultant Christer Bredbacka (1946–2000). In a later relationship, she had a son in 1993.

== Selected filmography ==
- The Last Adventure (1974)
- The Wing or the Thigh (1976)
- Néa (aka A Young Emmanuelle) (1976)
- At Night All Cats Are Crazy (1977)
