= Blue Virgin Isles (song) =

Song by Ted Gärdestad

from the album Blue Virgin Isles
- Language: English
- Released: October 1978
- Genre: Swedish pop
- Songwriter(s): Kenneth Gärdestad

Blue Virgin Isles is a song written by Ted Gärdestad and Kenneth Gärdestad, and originally recorded with lyrics in English on the Ted Gärdestad album "Blue Virgin Isles", released October 1978. as well as appearing as a B-side for the 1979 single "Satellit".

Recording it with lyrics in Swedish by Kenneth Gärdestad as Himlen är oskyldigt blå (English: The sky is innocently blue), Ted Gärdestad released it as a single in 1993 charting at Svensktoppen for seven weeks between 18 September and 30 October 1993, peaking at 4th position.

The song has also been recorded by Tommy Körberg. and by Yohio on his 2013 album Break the Border. Kikki Danielsson recorded the song with lyrics in English on her 2006 album "I dag & i morgon" The song has also been performed live by Håkan Hellström during the "Från tango till Taube" shows with Sven-Bertil Taube.
