= Vispop =

Music genre

- Etymology: Derives from "visa"/"vise"
- Other names: Visesang
- Stylistic origins: Pop rock; folk rock; Nordic folk music
- Cultural origins: Mid-1960s, Scandinavia
- Typical instruments: Acoustic guitar

Other topics
- Music of Sweden; Music of Norway

Vispop is a music genre which originated from and became popular in the Scandinavian countries in the mid-1960s. The term is derived from the word visa which denotes traditional and popular folk song of Sweden. In Norway the term applied to this type of accompanied singing is visesang. During the 1970s this was among the most popular genres of music in Scandinavia.

== Characteristics ==
Vispop is typically performed by a singer-songwriter playing an acoustic guitar, and the lyrics often expresses social commentary. Musical groups such as the Norwegian group Ballade! also occur.

The genre could be compared to American folk rock or bluegrass.

== List of notable artists ==
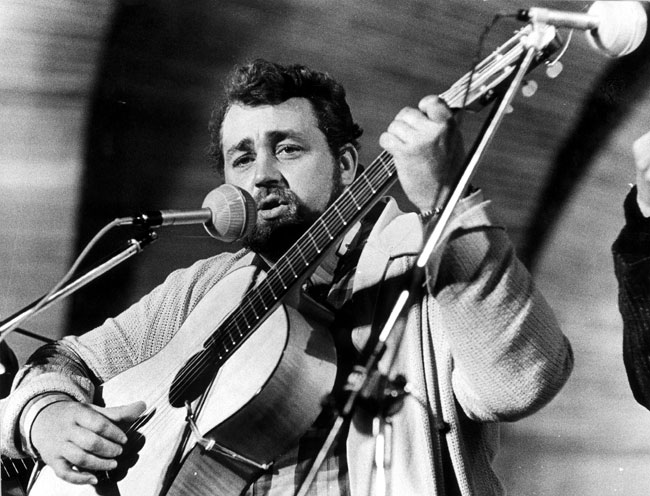
Cornelis Vreeswijk in 1966

Norway

- Ane Brun
- Alf Cranner
- Jan Eggum
- Finn Kalvik
- Åse Kleveland
- Kristian Kristensen
- Moddi
- Lillebjørn Nilsen
- Siri Nilsen
- Øystein Sunde
- Halvdan Sivertsen
- Frida Ånnevik

Sweden

- Lisa Ekdahl
- Ted Gärdestad
- Jakob Hellman
- Uno Svenningsson
- Cornelis Vreeswijk

== See also ==
- Visebølgen i Norge – Referring to the music movement in Norway that started in the mid-1960s
