= Atlantis Studios =

Recording studio in Stockholm, Sweden

Coordinates: 59°20′32″N 18°2′0″E

Atlantis Studios is a recording studio at Karlbergsvägen 57 in Stockholm. Founded in 1959 as Metronome Studios, it is the location of early recordings of the members of ABBA prior to the formation of the group, as well as the majority of the group's hit singles and recordings by The Cardigans, Roxette, Opeth, The Hives, and others.

== History ==
=== Metronome ===
The premises opened in 1941 as the 330-seat Kadetten cinema. Two years later, its name was changed to Terry. The theater closed in 1959.

The same year, the Metronome record label converted the premises into a recording studio. The studio was run by Anders Burman and Börje Ekberg sound engineers Gösta Wiholm and Rune Persson. Among the first recordings made in the new studio were with Siw Malmkvist and Owe Thörnqvist. The studio also recorded projects for other record labels, such as Povel Ramel's company Knäppupp and AB Svenska Ord. Michael B. Tretow began working as an engineer at the studios in January 1968.

The Swedish folk-Schlager group Hootenanny Singers recorded their albums at Metronome, and when band member Björn Ulvaeus started writing songs with Benny Andersson, most of those compositions were recorded at the studio. Ulvaeus' girlfriend Agnetha Fältskog also recorded at the studio, and she and Andersson's girlfriend Anni-Frid Lyngstad contributed backing vocals to Ulvaeus and Andersson's 1970 album Lycka. The four began recording songs together under the group name ABBA, and the majority of the group's bigger hit singles were recorded at Metronome, including "Waterloo", "Mama Mia", and "Knowing Me, Knowing You". In 1978, Ulvaeus and Andersson, along with Polar Music co-founder Stig Anderson, established Polar Studios, which then became the studio where ABBA recorded. Once Polar Studios was established, Tretow left Metronome to work at Polar, where he eventually became studio manager.

=== Atlantis ===
In 1983, Metronome Studio was bought by Janne Hansson, who had been working there as an engineer for 10 years. Hansson changed the name to Atlantis Grammofon AB. Hansson ran the studio from 1983 to May 2020 when a group consisting of Polar Studios veteran Stefan Boman, former Kent guitarist Sami Sirviö, Martin Terefe, Jörgen Ringstrand, Lars-Johan Jarnheimer, and Jonas Kamprad took over the operation.

== Artists ==
Selected artists who have recorded at Metronome/Atlantis studios:

- Abalone Dots
- ABBA
- Agnetha Fältskog
- Ale Möller
- Amanda Jenssen
- Ane Brun
- Anna-Lotta Larsson
- Anna Ternheim
- Anne-Lie Rydé
- Anne Sofie von Otter
- Arne Domnérus
- Bear Quartet
- Benny Anderssons orkester
- Björn J:son Lindh
- Brenda Russell
- Bo Kaspers Orkester
- Brick
- The Cardigans
- Carola Häggkvist
- Caroline af Ugglas
- Chris Kläfford
- Christian Walz
- Coleman Hawkins
- The Concretes
- Cornelis Vreeswijk
- Ed Harcourt
- Electric Banana Band
- Elvis Costello
- Entombed
- Esbjörn Svensson Trio
- Fatboy Slim
- Fibes, Oh Fibes
- Fred Åkerström
- Frida Hyvönen
- Gladys del Pilar
- Green Day
- Gösta Linderholm
- Harpo
- Harry Arnold
- The Hives
- Hootenanny Singers
- Humberto Gessinger
- Imperiet
- James Iha
- Jan Johansson
- Jan Lundgren
- Jay-Jay Johanson
- Jeanette Lindström
- Jenny Wilson
- Jerry Williams
- Joey Tempest
- Jojje Wadenius
- Kalle Moraeus
- Kent
- Kjell Höglund
- Kristina Lugn
- Kristofer Åström
- Lars Winnerbäck
- Lasse Berghagen
- Lena Willemark
- Lenny Kravitz
- Lill Lindfors
- Lisa Ekdahl
- Lisa Nilsson
- Little Gerhard
- Louise Hoffsten
- Lykke Li
- Magnus Carlsson
- Magnus Lindberg
- Magnus Lindgren
- Magnus Öström
- Mando Diao
- Marie Bergman
- Marit Bergman
- Matti Bye
- Mats Ronander
- Max Martin
- Meja
- Melissa Horn
- Melody Club
- Meryl Streep
- Mickey Jupp
- Mikael Rickfors
- Moneybrother
- Monica Zetterlund
- Motorpsycho
- Myrra Malmberg
- Nicolai Dunger
- Nils Landgren
- Ola Magnell
- Olle Ljungström
- Opeth
- Orup
- Owe Thörnqvist
- Peter Bjorn and John
- Peter Jöback
- Popsicle
- Primal Scream
- Pugh Rogefeldt
- Putte Wickman
- Quincy Jones
- Randy Crawford
- The Real Group
- Rebecka Törnqvist
- Rikard Wolff
- Robyn
- Roxette
- Sahara Hotnights
- Sanne Salomonsen
- Sarah Blasko
- Scorpions
- Shotgun Messiah
- Shout Out Louds
- Siw Malmkvist
- Sofia Karlsson
- Sophie Zelmani
- Søs Fenger
- Staffan Hellstrand
- Stefan Sundström
- Stonefunkers
- Susanna Wallumrød
- Svante Thuresson
- Ted Gärdestad
- Teddybears
- The Tiny
- Titiyo
- Tom Trick
- Tomas Andersson Wij
- Tommy Nilsson
- Ulf Lundell
- Uno Svenningsson
- Väsen
- Weeping Willows
