= Roger Palm =

Swedish drummer (1949–2024)

- Born: 31 March 1949; Kyrktåsjö, Sweden
- Died: 22 September 2024 (aged 75) Stockholm, Sweden
- Instrument: Drums
- Years active: 1960s–2024
- Formerly of: ABBA

Roger Palm (31 March 1949 – 22 September 2024) was a Swedish drummer. He played drums on ABBA recordings in the 1970s.

== ABBA ==
Roger met Benny Andersson and Björn Ulvaeus in the early 70s. Palm's first ABBA-related recording was on a solo single by Anni-Frid Lyngstad and produced Andersson. His first recording with ABBA was "Rock'n Roll Band", recorded in August 1972 and released in 1973. Palm was not the main drummer for the band, as Ola Brunkert played on more tracks, but Palm did play on singles including "I Do, I Do, I Do, I Do, I Do", "Mamma Mia", "Dancing Queen", "Thank You For The Music" and "Take A Chance On Me". He also played on "Satellit", a hit song for Ted Gärdestad who represented Sweden in the 1979 Eurovision song contest with the song.

== Personal life ==
He was born in Kyrktåsjö in 1949. His first band, The Skymen, was formed in 1964 was a guitar band and then a dance orchestra. played in bands such as The Gimmicks and then the Beatmakers until 1974 before working as a session musician in 1970. He was also in the band Moonlighters in 1974.

Palm died from Alzheimer's disease on 22 September 2024. He was 75.
