= Ted Gärdestad =

Swedish musician

- Gärdestad in 1979
- Born: Ted Arnbjörn Gärdestad; 18 February 1956; Sollentuna, Sweden
- Died: 22 June 1997 (aged 41); Sollentuna, Sweden
- Occupations: Singer; songwriter; musician; actor
- Years active: 1966–1981; 1991–1996
- Partner: Ann Zacharias (1981–1983)
- Children: 2
- Relatives: Kenneth Gärdestad (brother)
- Musical career
- Genres: Rock; pop
- Instruments: Vocals; guitar; piano
- Labels: Polydor; Polar; Epic

Ted Arnbjörn Gärdestad (Swedish: [ˈtɛdː ˈjæ̂ːɖɛˌstɑːd]; 18 February 1956 – 22 June 1997), known internationally as Ted, was a Swedish singer, songwriter, and actor. Gärdestad began his acting career in 1966 and began playing music in 1971, signing with Polar Music. Assigned with in-house producers Benny Andersson and Björn Ulvaeus, Gärdestad released his first single, "Hela världen runt," in late 1971 and worked closely with the four members of ABBA to create his debut album Undringar (1972). As Polar Music's best-selling solo artist (aside from ABBA), he continued to work with the group members throughout the 1970s, releasing three more albums Ted (1973), Upptåg (1974) and Franska Kort (1976), which were moderately successful. In 1978, Gärdestad released his first English-language album, Blue Virgin Isles, which did not have success internationally, as his predecessor albums had in his home country.

In 1979, Ted and his brother Kenneth Gärdestad played at Melodifestivalen, the competition to select Sweden's entry for the Eurovision Song Contest, with the song "Satellit." They won the competition which allowed them to represent Sweden at Eurovision held in Jerusalem. Gärdestad attempted once more to enter a song at Melodifestivalen but was unsuccessful. He left the music industry shortly thereafter, to try acting. By the 1990s, he played with other musicians such as Harpo. Gärdestad toured extensively starting in 1994 until he died by suicide in 1997. A biographical film about Gärdestad was released in 2018, called Ted: För kärlekens skull.

== Early life ==
Ted Arnbjörn Gärdestad was born to Arne and Margit Gärdestad (née Sjöholm) on 18 February 1956 in Sollentuna, Stockholm County. He was the youngest of three siblings and had two older brothers: Kjell and Kenneth. The family lived in Sollentuna during Ted's childhood.

== Career ==
=== 1962–1974 ===
Ted Gärdestad began his career as a musician in 1962, playing accordion on Swedish television at the age of six years. His debuted as an actor in 1966 when he landed a part in the television advent calendar series En småstad vid seklets början (A Small Town at the Turn of the Century). In 1970, Gärdestad had a minor role in the American film Story of a Woman alongside Bibi Andersson, Robert Stack and James Farentino. Gärdestad was also a promising tennis player. At 14 he ranked second in his age group in Sweden after Björn Borg, and once considered a career as a professional tennis player but instead chose a career in music. In 1971, 15-year-old Ted and his eight-year-older brother Kenneth Gärdestad contacted the record company Polar Music and showed an audition tape to Stig "Stikkan" Anderson, who would later manage the pop group ABBA. Ted was composer and singer, while Kenneth wrote lyrics to Ted's melodies, a collaboration that continued throughout Ted's career. Anderson subsequently signed Ted to the label and assigned him to in-house producers Benny Andersson and Björn Ulvaeus.

==== Debut single ====
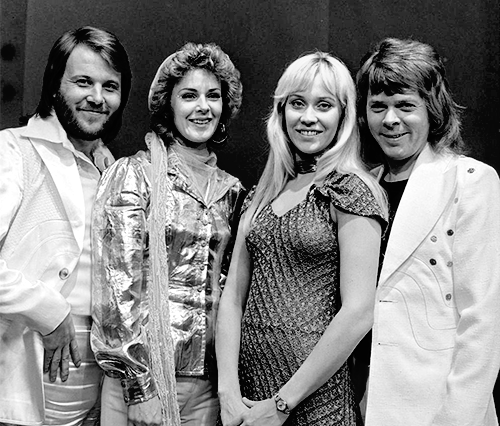
ABBA, Ted's collaborators, in 1974

In late 1971, Gärdestad released his first single, the gospel-influenced "Hela världen runt" ("All Over the World"). The follow-up single, an acoustic ballad "Jag vill ha en egen måne" ("I Want a Moon of My Own"), a song he wrote at age 12, brought him to the attention of the Swedish public. He quickly became the country's first teen idol, and toured on the folkpark circuit. Andersson and Ulvaeus produced Ted's debut album Undringar ("Wonderings"), which was released on Polar Music in early 1972 and spent 10 weeks at the top of the Kvällstoppen combined singles and albums chart. Agnetha Fältskog and Anni-Frid Lyngstad providing backing vocals on the album, and all four members of ABBA continued to work with Gärdestad during the 1970s. His albums Undringar (1972), Ted (1973), Upptåg (1974) and Franska Kort (1976) were produced with the same recording and production techniques, engineers (including Michael B. Tretow) and musicians, as contemporaneous ABBA recordings.

In February 1973, Gärdestad entered Melodifestivalen 1973, the competition to select Sweden's entry for the Eurovision Song Contest. The song "Oh, vilken härlig dag" ("Oh What a Lovely Day") came joint fourth. A quartet known as Björn & Benny, Agnetha & Anni-Frid finished third with a song called "Ring Ring (Bara du slog en signal)." Gärdestad had another attempt in Melodifestivalen 1975 with the song "Rockin' 'n' Reelin'"; Svenne and Lotta placed third with "Bang-A-Boomerang" and Gärdestad finished seventh but the song became a hit single on radio charts Svensktoppen, Heta Högen and Kvällstoppen. Gärdestad and his brother Kenneth returned to Melodifestivalen in 1977 but then only as composers and lyricists of the song "Det bästa som finns" ("The Best of All") and instead chose Polar Music labelmate Lena Andersson to perform the song. They finished eighth out of ten entries, and Gärdestad himself did not record the track.

=== 1975–1979 ===
By 1975, Ted had become a noted star in Sweden. He was prominently featured in teen magazines Starlet, Mitt Livs Novell and Poster, his love life was covered by the national newspapers, he had a fan club, and all of his albums were certificated gold and sold well in the rest of Scandinavia. Aside from Björn, Benny, Agnetha & Anni-Frid/ABBA and Anni-Frid Lyngstad he was Polar Music's best-selling artist. Stikkan had plans to launch him internationally and Ted recorded both Swedish and English versions of "Rockin' 'n' Reelin'" as well as an English version of an earlier hit, "Jag ska fånga en ängel" ("I'm Going to Catch An Angel"), with the title "Gonna Make You My Angel," the latter with lyrics by Gary Osborne; neither were a significant hit. Australian pop singer Mark Holden did, however, have a major success in Australia with "Jag ska fånga en ängel" under the title "I Wanna Make You My Lady" in 1976.

By 1977, Gärdestad was faced with a dilemma common to many child stars and teen idols; as he grew up so did his audiences. The time of teen mania and screaming crowds in the folkparks was declining and Polar in-house producers Björn and Benny, who had played an important part in his early success were now busy writing, producing and promoting ABBA and could no longer give Gärdestad or other Polar artists their full attention. 1975 resulted in the release of one single, the Melodifestivalen entry "Rockin' 'n' Reelin'." In 1976, the label released the album Franska Kort ("French Cards" – an expression for a fairly innocent type of late 19th-century pornography), only partly recorded with Björn and Benny and co-produced by Tretow and Janne Schaffer. The album produced hit singles "Angela," "Chapeau-Claque" (French for top hat), "När showen är slut" ("When the Show is Over") and "Klöversnoa," a novelty folk dance parody with Benny and Gärdestad playing accordion. The album peaked at No. 3, making it his first album not to top the Swedish charts, and it left the chart after 22 weeks, a moderate success compared to his previous releases. In 1977, ABBA and most of the Polar Music crew including musicians and sound engineers went on their first world tour, making ABBA: The Movie and recording ABBA: The Album – as an indirect result, Gärdestad did not release an album that year.

=== International career ===
Stig Anderson still thought Gärdestad had some international potential, and he and his brother Kenneth travelled to Hollywood in late 1977 to record Gärdestad's first English-language album Blue Virgin Isles. The west coast rock orientated album featured contributions from American and English musicians including Jeff Porcaro, Steve Porcaro, Jim Keltner, David Hungate, Jay Graydon, Dr. John and John Mayall, many of whom were Gärdestad's personal idols. Blue Virgin Isles was released worldwide in late 1978 on Epic Records, and produced the singles "Take Me Back To Hollywood," an English version of "Chapeau-Clacque," and "Love, You're Making All The Fools". Despite the expensive production and the big push to launch Gärdestad—including promotional appearances alongside ABBA—his Swedish success did not translate internationally. In Sweden, the album peaked at No. 29 and spent one week on the chart. Thirty years after its original release, Blue Virgin Isles remains Gärdestad 's only studio album that has not been re-released on CD by Polar Music/PolyGram/Universal Music Group.

=== 1980s ===
In early 1979, Ted and Kenneth Gärdestad had a fourth attempt at Melodifestivalen and won with the song "Satellit," a mid-tempo rock track whose arrangement bore resemblances to Toto's 1978 hit "Hold the Line". The similarities caused speculation of plagiarism in the Swedish media and disqualification from the contest. The connection between the two songs was that the song's producer Janne Schaffer had heard four of the future Toto members, Steve Porcaro, Jeff Porcaro, David Hungate and Steve Lukather, experimenting with a guitar and bass riff during the Blue Virgin Isles sessions in Los Angeles, which eventually evolved into "Hold the Line." Schaffer was inspired by what he had heard when he wrote the arrangement for "Satellit," but at that point neither "Hold the Line" nor Toto's debut eponymous album had been released. Jeff Porcaro told Swedish newspaper Aftonbladet in February 1979: "No, it's not a rip-off, Ted did not steal our song. Those piano triplets and that bass and guitar line go back to the 1950s and the fact that we both have happened to use variations on the same theme in our songs right now is purely coincidental." Consequently, Ted represented Sweden at the Eurovision Song Contest held in Jerusalem in March 1979. After having competed four times in the pre-selection before winning and with his personal connection to ABBA, hopes and expectations were high. The song scored eight points and finished seventeenth out of nineteen participating entries, making it Sweden's then-second-lowest placing in the contest. The Swedish-language single became a Top 10 hit back home in Sweden and "Satellit" is regarded as one of Ted's signature tunes. The English-language version of the track never charted and neither did the re-issue of Blue Virgin Isles, which included both versions, making it clear that Ted's Scandinavian audiences favoured his Swedish-language material.

After an unsuccessful return to Melodifestivalen in 1980, with "Låt solen värma dig" ("Let the Sun Warm You") with then girlfriend Annica Boller and disappointing sales of his 1981 album Stormvarning (#31, 2 weeks)—which was internationally released as I'd Rather Write a Symphony on the Polydor label in a few countries and equally overlooked—Gärdestad left the music scene at the age of 25.

=== Later work ===
Having left the music business, Gärdestad made a brief and unsuccessful attempt at acting and shortly thereafter began exploring meditation and Eastern religions. He became involved with the Bhagwan Shree Rajneesh (also known as Osho) movement and publicly renounced his earlier life. In an interview with Swedish newspaper Aftonbladet in mid-1983, he said he no longer wanted to be addressed as "Ted Gärdestad," his name was now Swami Sangit Upasani. Like all Bhagwan disciples, he wore clothes in a specific shade of orange. Gärdestad distanced himself from his friends in the music business and his family as his involvement in the movement gradually took over his life, affecting his personality. In June 1983, one month before his second child with actress Ann Zacharias was born, he unexpectedly left his family and friends and moved to the movement's headquarters in Oregon, United States. Three years later, after Rajneesh was convicted for immigration fraud, tax evasion, embezzlement of his disciples' funds and bioterror attacks on the citizens of The Dalles and subsequently deported from the US, Gärdestad's family persuaded him to move back to Sweden. His severe mental health problems became increasingly apparent.

==== Palme assassination rumours ====
Shortly after Gärdestad's return to Sweden in 1986, the Prime Minister of Sweden, Olof Palme, was murdered. Gärdestad was wrongly mentioned in the Swedish media as "the 33-year-old," a suspect in the investigation of the assassination, which severely affected him although Gärdestad was on vacation in Greece at the time of the murder, and although he was never questioned by the Swedish police nor was under suspicion by the authorities, the speculations and rumours followed him and his family for the rest of the 1980s. A few years later, he was again the subject of rumours accusing him of being Lasermannen, a bank robber and serial killer. The rumours affected the sensitive and already unstable former star, and Gärdestad withdrew and fell into a deep depression.

=== 1990s ===
In the early 1990s, Gärdestad was briefly coaxed out of retirement by his friend and fellow Swedish pop singer Harpo. He joined Harpo on a concert tour and made guest appearances. In 1992, they released the duet "Lycka" ("Happiness") as a single; it garnered little attention but marked Gärdestad's return to music. Early that year he embarked on his first tour since 1978 and played a series of dates with Plura Jonsson, Tove Naess, Totta Näslund and Dan Hylander, and received overall positive reviews from the press.

In 1993, a compilation album titled Kalendarium 1972–93 was promoted by a tour in the Swedish folkparks; the album and tour were successful, as was his first composition in twelve years, "För kärlekens skull" ("For Love's Sake"), which topped the Svensktoppen chart. The Kalendarium collection included a Swedish-language re-recording of the title track from Blue Virgin Isles, "Himlen är oskyldigt blå" ("The Sky is Innocently Blue"), which fifteen years after its original release became another Svensktoppen hit, and became one of his best-known songs. In early 1994, Kalendarium 1972–93 was awarded a platinum disc. All of Gärdestad's albums from the 1970s and early 1980s, with the exception of Blue Virgin Isles, were re-released on CD by Polar, and a generation of Swedes who grew up listening to his music now re-discovered and re-evaluated his back catalogue as adults. His body of work has since come to be regarded as a national treasure as important as those of Evert Taube, Carl Michael Bellman and Cornelis Vreeswijk both by fans and Swedish music critics.

=== Last years and death ===
The following year, Gärdestad released a full-length album of new material titled Äntligen på väg (Finally on the Road) on Polar, which was produced by the longtime friend Janne Schaffer. The album included contributions from ABBA drummer Per Lindvall, Björn J:son Lindh, Gladys del Pilar and Marie Bergman, and other renowned Swedish musicians. It spawned a series of singles including "Ge en sol" ("Give a Sun"), "Om du ville ha mig" ("If You Wanted Me"), "I min radio" ("On My Radio") and "Hon är kvinnan" ("She's the Woman"), all of which entered the Svensktoppen chart.

He remarried and returned to making music. He made several television appearances promoting Äntligen på väg album and performed an acoustic concert on ZTV. He toured extensively all through 1994, 1995 and 1996.

On 22 June 1997, at the age of 41, Gärdestad died by suicide by jumping in front of a train. The only colleagues from his musical career to attend his funeral were Schaffer, J:son Lindh, Tretow, Barbro 'Lill-Babs' Svensson and Agnetha Fältskog.

== Health problems ==
After Gärdestad's death, his brother Kenneth spoke to the press and in a book about Gärdestad's mental health problems during the last decade of his life. In the biography Jag vill ha en egen måne, published eight years after his brother's death, Kenneth said Gärdestad had had anxiety since his late teens, and that Kenneth had become convinced that as an adult Gärdestad had paranoid schizophrenia, which he thought had been aggravated by his time with the Bhagwan movement, the press coverage and the subsequent public persecution following the murder of Olof Palme and the Lasermannen case. In the 2005 biography on Gärdestad, Schaffer said he attended a dinner party in the late 1990s with a large number of Swedish dignitaries, including leading politicians, statesmen, representatives of the diplomatic corps, and the chief editor of Sweden's largest daily newspaper Dagens Nyheter, who said in front of all the prominent guests: "You know that it's your pal Ted Gärdestad who murdered Olof Palme, don't you?" Schaffer immediately left the dinner party. In the biography, Kenneth Gärdestad also said Ted's condition was never properly diagnosed during his lifetime and he did not receive the medical or psychotherapeutic treatment that could have saved his life.

== Musicianship ==
=== Songwriting ===
Musically Ted's songs combined the heritage of the Scandinavian acoustic and narrative visa tradition with influences from the British-American singer-songwriter wave of the late 1960s and early 1970s, but his repertoire also included a wide variety of genre exercises including pastiches of swing, jazz, ragtime, boogie-woogie, reggae, country and western, French chanson, Swedish folk music as well as contemporary English and American pop, rock, soul and R&B. Following musicians and songwriters of their generation, both brothers were fans of the Beatles and influenced by the fact that John Lennon and Paul McCartney wrote their own material and played it themselves, which was revolutionary at that time. The early Swedish albums with Ted all also contain one or two English-language tracks, usually slightly rougher and rockier than the rest of the material and many of them featuring Schaffer on electric guitars.

Lyrically the songs reflected the world of an average young teenager, no longer a child but not yet an adult, and his personal development; the dreams, hopes and desires as well as the fears and frustrations, infatuation and rejection ("När du kommer," "Räcker jag till"), existential ponderings ("Universum," "Snurra du min värld," "Gitarren och jag") alongside typical adolescent fantasies and daydreams of historical figures such as the Vikings ("Viking"), "Buffalo Bill," Goliath ("Goliat från Gat") or becoming a superhero like "The Phantom" ("Fantomen"), and naturally, as with most teenagers, also playful hints at an increased interest in the opposite sex. His Melodifestivalen entry "Oh, vilken härlig dag" for instance includes phrases such as "I snuck down to the lake, to spy on you when you went skinny dipping" and "I ran naked in the blazing sun", and "And I could see what you're hiding under your skirt"; a line that was considered risqué when sung by a seventeen-year-old boy in the pre-selection for the Eurovision Song Contest in 1973. Despite the fact that all lyrics were the work of Ted's eight-year-older brother Kenneth and not Ted himself, they were specifically written to reflect Ted's personality and his world, and the feelings of a teenager, not those of his older brother.

In a similar way to Benny Andersson and Björn Ulvaeus of ABBA, Ted wrote faux-English demo lyrics when he composed his songs and it was subsequently Kenneth's task to write proper Swedish lyrics while staying true to Ted's original idea for a particular song. Kenneth spent a considerable amount of time getting the words exactly as Ted wanted them, with the right number of syllables to the bar, rhymes and alliterations emphasizing the rhythm of the music and choosing words suitable for a boy in his teens, occasionally including slang expressions. Like sound engineer Michael B. Tretow, Ted was also known for his prankish sense of humour; he was a big fan of Monty Python's Flying Circus and loved practical jokes, which also is reflected in the lyrics in the form of puns, word play, and double entendres. Kenneth's skills as a lyricist paradoxically resulted in the fact that some of Ted's audiences, in the 1970s and even to the present day, were under the impression that he wrote both the music and all lyrics, which Kenneth has since revealed that he only took as recognition that he had done Ted's music justice and it was the best compliment that he could get.

== Legacy ==
Cover of the 2014 tribute album För kärlekens skull – Svenska artister hyllar Ted Gärdestad

A scholarship was set up in Gärdestad's name in 1997 to promote unsigned singer-songwriters and is awarded annually along with a tribute concert.

In 2005, a musical based around Gärdestad's songs called Sol, vind och vatten opened in Stockholm. Also in 2005, Gärdestad's brother Kenneth wrote a biography about Ted's life called Jag vill ha en egen måne, named after his breakthrough single. It includes extensive interviews with Gärdestad's family and close friends, including tennis player Björn Borg, actor Per Ragnar, guitarist Staffan Astner, pianist Robert Wells, sound engineer Lennart Östlund, photographer Barry B. Levine, hockey player Mats Ulander, and his former girlfriend actress Ann Zacharias.

In 2006, British bassist Andy Bell, noted founding member of Ride and former Oasis member, at the time living in Sweden and a great admirer of Ted's work, took part in the annual tribute concert held in Stockholm.

On 16 October 2006, Kenneth received a special award from SKAP, The Swedish Society of Popular Music Composers, for his "outstanding contributions to Swedish performing arts as a lyricist," in memory of his brother Ted.

=== In popular culture ===
On 11 September 2012, Sweden's central bank, the Riksbank, announced a new series of coins to replace the 1 and 5 kronor coins which came into circulation in October 2016. The design of the coins follow the theme of Gärdestad's song, "Sol, vind och vatten" (English: "Sun, wind and water"), with the designs depicting the elements on the reverse side of the coins. This included the reintroduction of the 2 kronor coin. The coins also have a new portrait of King Carl XVI Gustaf.

On 3 January 2018, the feature film Ted – För kärlekens skull, a biopic about Gärdestad, premiered. Covering parts of his life from the breakthrough in the 1970s to his comeback in the 1990s, the film stars actor Adam Pålsson (a former singer who sings all the song parts himself) in the role as Ted, and was directed by Academy Award nominee Hannes Holm.

=== Re-releases, compilations and covers ===
Fifteen years after his death, Gärdestad's music became increasingly popular in Sweden. Many of his songs were included on compilations and were covered by other artists and are now considered modern Swedish pop classics. His original studio albums and compilations still sold well; 2001s Droppar av solregn reached No. 2 and spent 47 weeks on the Swedish albums chart, and the 2004 2-CD set Sol vind och vatten – Det bästa peaked at No. 3 and charted for 60 consecutive weeks.

In 2000, "Jag vill ha en egen måne," "Så mycket bättre" and "Come Give Me Love" were featured in Swedish film director Lukas Moodysson's comedy drama Tillsammans (international title: Together). In 2001, Tretow and Kenneth Gärdestad took part in the production of a 4-CD box set titled Solregn (Sunshowers), a compilation of 71 tracks that includes two previously unreleased recordings.

In 2004, a line-up of Swedish artists headed by Schaffer and including Mats Ronander, J:son Lindh, Jennifer Brown and rapper Dogge Doggelito performed a ten-minute medley of Gärdestad's best-known songs as the interval act of that year's Melodifestivalen, to commemorate the 25th anniversary of Ted winning the contest with "Satellit." Also in 2004, an album of covers of some of Gärdestad's songs called Fånga En Ängel – En hyllning till Ted Gärdestad (Catch An Angel – A tribute to Ted Gärdestad) was released, featuring contemporary Swedish artists including Håkan Hellström, Helen Sjöholm, Patrik Isaksson, Fredrik Kempe, Fame, Lisa Miskovsky, and Josefin Nilsson of Ainbusk. The album was released on the Anderson Records label run by Stig Anderson's daughter Marie Ledin. Country singer and fellow Eurovision contestant Jill Johnson's acoustic version of Gärdestad's 1973 Melodifestivalen entry "Oh vilken härlig dag" and Helen Sjöholm's recording of "Come Give Me Love" became radio hits and were also issued as singles.

In June 2009, Universal Music Group, the company that owns the rights to the Polar Music back catalogue, released an 8-CD, 91-track box set titled Helt Nära Dig – Samlade Album (Quite Close to You – Collected Albums). The set includes all six of Gärdestad's Swedish-language albums and Blue Virgin Isles, and features selected tracks from his second English-language album I'd Rather Write a Symphony and some non-album singles. The box set reached No. 34 on the Swedish albums chart in July 2009 and re-entered the chart a year later in July 2010, reaching No. 12.

In 2010, the track "Så mycket bättre" from Gärdestad's debut album Undringar was covered by the Swedish stars Lasse Berghagen, Thomas Di Leva, Plura Jonsson of Eldkvarn, Barbro "Lill-Babs" Svensson, Petter, Christer Sandelin and Petra Marklund, and was used as the theme tune to a television reality show of the same name. This resulted in renewed interest in Gärdestad's back catalogue and his original recording of the song entering the digital singles chart in Sweden in October 2010 – almost four decades after its first release.

=== Caramba ===
In 1981, Gärdestad and ABBA's sound engineer Michael B. Tretow had a surprise hit single with the novelty track "Hubba Hubba Zoot Zoot" in Sweden, released under the anonymous group moniker Caramba on the record label Trash Records (#1 June 1981, 26 weeks on the singles chart). The liner notes to Tretow's 1999 CD compilation Greatest Hits carry the following dedication: "This album is dedicated to Ted Gärdestad, who should be here now, rolling on the floor in paroxysms of laughter as usual."

== Discography ==
=== Singles ===
- "Hela världen runt" / "Sommarlängtan," Polar Music POS 1146, 1971
- "Jag vill ha en egen måne" / "När du kommer," Polar Music POS 1155, 1972
- "Oh, vilken härlig da'" / "Sol vind och vatten," Polar Music POS 1170, 1973
- "Kaliforniens guld" / "Ramanagaram," Polar Music POS 1174, 1973
- "Come Give Me Love" / "Skolsång," Polar Music POS 1177, 1973
- "Gonna Make You My Angel" ("Jag ska fånga en ängel") / "Can't Stop the Train," Epic Records EPC S 3126 (West Germany & UK), 1974
- "Rockin' 'n' Reelin'" (Swedish version) / "Gonna Make You My Angel" Polar Music POS 1201, 1975
- "Rockin' 'n' Reelin'" (English version) / "Gonna Make You My Angel," Polar Music POS 1202, 1975
- "Take Me Back to Hollywood" / "Back in the Business," Epic Records SEPC 6976 (UK), Polydor Records 2001 843 (West Germany & The Netherlands), RCA Records 103 271 (Australia), 1978
- "Love, You're Makin' All the Fools" / "Puddle of Pain," Polar Music POS 1243, Polydor Records 2001 891 (West Germany, The Netherlands, Switzerland, Austria), Discomate DSP-130 (Japan), 1978
- "Love, You're Makin' All the Fools" / "Love Lies Free," Epic Records SEPC 7477 (UK), 1978
- "Love, You're Makin' All the Fools" / "505 to Casablanca" RCA Records 103 395 (Australia), 1978
- "Satellit" (Swedish version) / "Blue Virgin Isles," Polar Music POS 1247, 1979
- "Satellite" (English version) / "Blue Virgin Isles," Polar Music POS 1248, Epic Records SEPC 7243 (UK), Polydor Records 2001 865 (The Netherlands), Carnaby (Spain), Polydor Records 2001 868 (Portugal), Carrere Records/Bagad 49476 (France), Durium DE 361 (Italy), Pan-Vox POS 1248 (Greece), Discomate DSP-128 (Japan), 1979
- "Satellite" / "Back in the Business," Polydor Records 2001 868 (West Germany, Switzerland, Austria), 1979
- "Låt solen värma dig" (duet with Annica Boller) / "Back in the Business," Polar Music POS 1261, 1980
- "Don't Treat Me This Way" / "Mindblower" ("Stormvarning"), Polydor Records 2002 003 (The Netherlands), 1980
- "How Do You Wanna Make Love" / "It's You," Polydor Records 2002 063 (Portugal), 1980
- "Låt kärleken slå rot" / "Mindblower," Polar Music POS 1275, 1981
- "Hubba Hubba Zoot Zoot" / "Donna Maya" (as Caramba), Trash Records TRAS 1, Epic EPC A1644 (UK), Toledo/Intercord Records 112 532 (West Germany), 1981
- "Hubba Hubba Zoot Zoot" / "Donna Maya" (as Caramba), RKM/Disques Vogue 310923, 12" single (France), Durium Records DEX 13018, 12" single, white vinyl (Italy), 1981
- "Hare Christmes" / "Ali Baba" (as Caramba), Trash Records TRAS 2, 1981
- "Lycka" (duet with Harpo) / "Trubaduren" (Harpo) / "Himmel" (Harpo), Warner Music CD 9031-77723-2, 1992
- "För kärlekens skull" / "Låt kärleken slå rot," Polar Music/PolyGram CD 865 552 – 2, 1993
- "För kärlekens skull" / "Låt kärleken slå rot," Polar Music/PolyGram 7" 865 552-7, 1993
- "Himlen är oskyldigt blå" / "Satellit" / "Låt kärleken slå rot," Polar Music/Polygram CD, 1993
- "Ge en sol" / "Lyckliga dagar," Polar Music/PolyGram CD 855 382-2, 1994
- "Om du ville ha mig" / "Jag bygger ett torn," Polar Music/PolyGram CD 851 314-2, 1994
- "Hon är kvinnan" / "Ruva min själ," Polar Music/PolyGram CD 853 818-2, 1995
- "Himlen är oskyldigt blå," Polar Music/Universal Music CD Polar Music/PolyGram 571 971-2, 1997
- "I'd Rather Write a Symphony" (Radio Edit) / "Lyckliga dagar," CD Polar Music/Universal Music CD 855 383-2, 2001

=== Studio albums ===
- Undringar, Polar Music POLS 234, 1972
- Ted, Polar Music POLS 241, 1973
- Upptåg, Polar Music POLS 253, 1974
- Franska Kort, Polar Music POLS 259, 1976
- Blue Virgin Isles, Polar Music POLS 284, Epic Records 383 653 (UK), 1978
- Blue Virgin Isles (re-release with "Satellite" & "Satellit" included), Polar Music POLS 300
- Blue Virgin Isles (re-release with "Satellite" included), Epic Records (UK), Polydor Records (West Germany, The Netherlands & Portugal), Carnaby (Spain), RCA Records (Australia), Discomate (Japan), 1979
- I'd Rather Write a Symphony, Polydor Records 2344 164, (West Germany & The Netherlands), 1980
- Stormvarning, Polar Music POLS 310, 1981
- Caramba, Trash Records TRASLP 1, 1981
- Äntligen på väg, Polar Music/PolyGram 523 835-2, 1994

=== Compilation albums ===
- Spotlight, Sonet SPCD-32, 1989
- Ted Gärdestad Collection, Polar Music/PolyGram 511 969-2, 1992
- Kalendarium 1972–93, Polar Music/PolyGram 519 052-2, 1993
- Svenska Popfavoriter, Karussell/PolyGram 552 270-2, 1996
- Solregn (4-CD box set), Polar Music/Universal Music 543 985-2, 2001
- Droppar Av Solregn (selected tracks from Solregn), Polar Music/Universal Music 549 881-2, 2001
- 15 Klassiker 1972–1981, Polar Music/Universal Music 018 405-2, 2002
- Sol, Vind Och Vatten – Det Bästa (2-CD set), Polar Music/Universal Music 986 647-5, 2004
- 18 Ballader, Polar Music/Universal Music 987105-0, 2005
- För Kärlekens Skull (3-CD box set), Polar Music/Universal Music, 060251734772-0 2007
- Helt Nära Dig – Samlade Album (8-CD box set), Polar Music/Universal Music 06025270733-0, 2009
- 4 CD Original Album (Undringar, Ted, Upptåg & Franska Kort), Universal Music 06025276545-0, 2011

== Filmography ==
- 1966 – En småstad vid seklets början (Translated: A Small Town at the Turn of the Century. TV advent calendar.)
- 1970 – Story of a Woman (Italian title: Storia di una donna. Director: Leonardo Bercovici.)
- 1973 – Stenansiktet (English title: The Stone Face. Director: Jan Halldoff.)

== Citations ==
Bibliography

- Gärdestad, Kenneth; Liimatainen, Keijo (2005). Jag vill ha en egen måne: boken om Ted Gärdestad (in Swedish). Stockholm: Forum. ISBN 91-37-12733-0. SELIBR 9876123.

| Preceded by Björn Skifs with "Det blir alltid värre framåt natten" | Sweden in the Eurovision Song Contest; 1979 | Succeeded by Tomas Ledin with "Just nu!" |
