= Björn J:son Lindh =

Swedish musician (1944–2013)

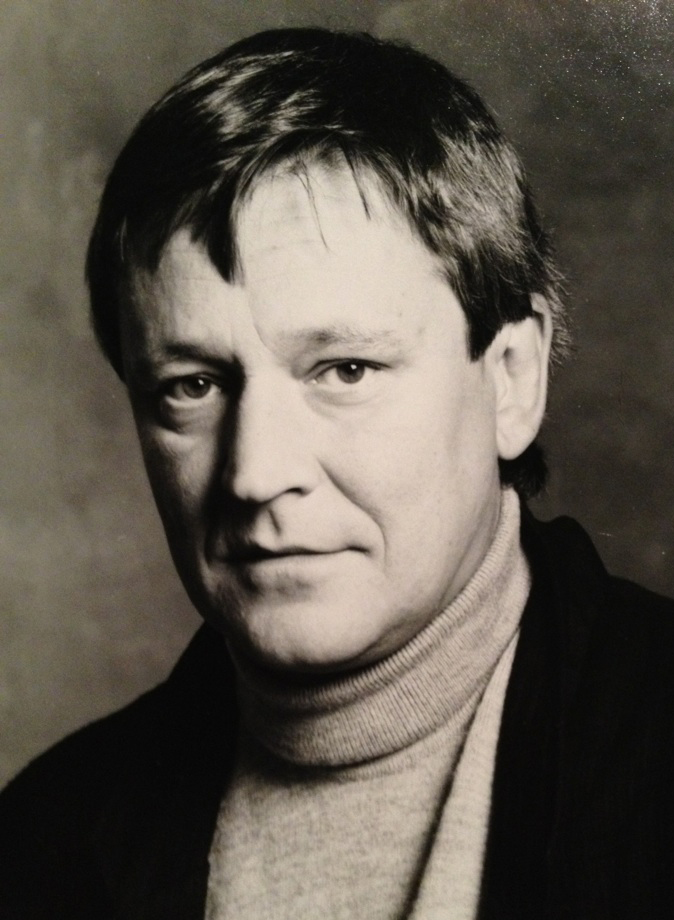

Background information
- Born: Björn Lindh; 25 October 1944; Arvika, Sweden
- Died: 21 December 2013 (aged 69) Nora, Sweden
- Occupations: Musician, composer
- Instruments: Flute, piano, keyboards
- Years active: 1960–2013
- Spouses: Kiki Lindh (m. 1969; div. 2006) Marie J:son Lindh Nordenmalm (m. 2009)

Björn J:son Lindh (born Björn Lindh; 25 October 1944 – 21 December 2013) was a Swedish flautist, pianist, music arranger, composer and artist. He worked in such diverse musical styles as jazz, classical, fusion, rock, prog rock and ethno. He composed for instance chamber music, symphonic works, concertos for various instruments and choirs as well as film scores for feature films and TV series in Scandinavia. J:son Lindh scored music for films such as Mannen på taket, directed by Bo Widerberg and Jägarna, directed by Kjell Sundvall.

J:son Lindh's ancestors' family name was Jansson for several generations. His father changed the family name to Lindh in 1931. The name combination J:son Lindh, where J:son originates from the family name Jansson, has been used since then, but was only in 2009 approved by the Swedish Patent and Registration Office as a family name.

== Career ==
In 1962, Björn J:son Lindh started his music education at Ingesund College of Music in Arvika. Between 1963 and 1971 he studied both piano and flute at the Royal Swedish Academy of Music (today Royal College of Music) in Stockholm. J:son Lindh started his professional career as a pop musician during the 1960s in the group Atlantic Ocean, but he was also active as a studio musician during the 1960s and 1970s. During the 1970s, J:son Lindh played in several groups, for instance Jason's Fleece, Handgjort, Baltik and Ablution. In 1973 he started the group Hörselmat together with Janne Schaffer and the group was still active during the 1980s. He played on many of Ralph Lundsten's albums during the 1970s and 1980s, and he also played with the classical pianist Staffan Scheja during the 1980s. The albums he recorded with Scheja was called the Europa-suite. J:son Lindh's first solo album Ramadan was released in 1971, and in 1972 the record companies Metronome and CTI Records released the album in U.S. The artist name he used in U.S. was "Jayson Lindh". His first U.S. release on Vanguard's Free Style label, A Day at the Surface, was recorded at Sonet Records in Stockholm in 1978 and included Janne Schaffer, the Gambian percussionist Malando Gassama, Pete Robinson on period synthesizer, and Stefan Brolund on Fender bass. In 1984, he played the flute solo on Murray Head's U.K. No. 1 single "One Night in Bangkok", taken from the Tim Rice/Benny Andersson/Björn Ulvaeus musical Chess. In 1986, he collaborated with the progressive new-age music group, Triangulus, on their self-titled album. He performed with musicians from other countries, for example on the album Islands by Mike Oldfield.

Although Björn J:son Lindh was a flautist, he frequently performed on the piano (or Fender Rhodes), and also made use of various synthesizers on many of his recordings. Some of his music is relatively experimental, using up-to-date technology and instruments of that time, such as the Synclavier which he made use of on the album Atlantis, together with Ralph Lundsten as engineer. He performed on Opeth's 2011 album Heritage, on the seventh track called Famine. He released about 30 solo albums during his career, and the piece of music that is most well known is probably "Brusa högre lilla å" (Sing Louder Little River).

J:son Lindh was also interested in visual art. He created graphic art by using copper ink, ink, watercolor and acrylic paint and he had several exhibitions since the middle of the 1990s.

He performed many times together with his wife Marie J:son Lindh Nordenmalm in the Church of Nora, Örebro County, where he was active until his death on 21 December 2013 in Nora of a brain tumor.

== Awards and honors ==
- 1971 : Gold Record for Cornelis Vreeswijk's album Spring mot Ulla -spring!, as arranger and musician
- 1971 : Gold Records for Cornelis Vreeswijk's double album Poem, ballader och lite blues, as arranger, composer and musician
- 1971 : A second place at the international radio competition Prix Jean-Antoine Triumph Variety Show in Monte Carlo, with "Musik från en storstad" from the album Från storstad till grodspad
- 1976: Gold Record for the album Cous Cous
- 1984: Silver Record for the album Europa, together with Staffan Scheja
- 1985: Svenska Fonogrampriset for the album Europa, together with Staffan Scheja
- 1987: Grammis Award for the best Swedish instrumental album with Feather Nights
- 1989: Platinum Records for the double album Den flygande holländaren, a tribute album to Cornelis Vreeswijk
- 1993: Cornelis Vreeswijk Scholarship
- 2003: Culture Prize of Arvika Township, Sweden
- 2006: SKAPs Music Drama Price
- 2010: Sweden's Sacred Choral Music Association's Medal of Merit Musica Sacra
- 2013: Flory Green Scholarship along with his wife Marie J:son Lindh Nordenmalm
- 2015: Culture Prize of Nora Township, Sweden (posthumously)

== Discography – albums ==
- 1971 – Ramadan (released in US and Germany 1972)
- 1971 – Från storstad till grodspad
- 1972 – Cous Cous (released in US, Netherlands and Spain 1973)
- 1973 – Sissel (released in US 1974)
- 1974 – Boogie Woogie (released in Netherlands 1974 and in Spain 1976. Was released in US 1975 with the title Second Carneval)
- 1976 – Raggie (released in UK 1977 with the title Jayson Lindh)
- 1978 – Bike Voyage II (released in US 1978 and in UK 1980 with the title A Day At The Surface)
- 1980 – Våta vingar (released in UK with the title Wet Wings)
- 1981 – Musik (released in UK with the title "To Be Continued...")
- 1983 – Atlantis-Bilder från en ö (released in US, Canada and UK with the title Atlantis)
- 1984 – Europa (Opus I) (together with Staffan Scheja)
- 1985 – Spirits of Europa Opus II (together with Staffan Scheja. Released in US, Canada 1986 and Japan 1987 with the title Spirits Of Europa)
- 1985 – Världen vänder
- 1986 – Rhapsody Of Sweden
- 1987 – Feather Nights
- 1987 – Hörselmat med Gävleborgs Symfoniorkester
- 1989 – Europa Opus III, Bridges (together with Staffan Scheja)
- 1989 – Svensk rapsodi
- 1990 – Tid Brusa (together with Janne Schaffer and Gunnar Idenstam)
- 1991 – Spotlight – a compilation
- 1993 – Profeten (text read by Peter Haber)
- 1994 – Brusa högre lilla å – a compilation (reissued 1999)
- 1998 – Opus Europa-The Collection – a compilation (together with Staffan Scheja)
- 1999 – In the Air (together with Gothenburg Opera Symphony Orchestra and Uppsala Chamber Soloists)
- 2000 – Den hela människan (music from the film Hälsoresan. Together with Janne Schaffer and Electric Banana Band)
- 2000 – Guldkorn – a compilation
- 2001 – Inner Beauty (together with Torbjörn Carlsson)
- 2001 – Mental avslappning
- 2002 – Dansmeditation
- 2002 – En dag på gården (Vestmanniaensemblen)
- 2002 – Julglöd (together with Janne Schaffer, Leif Strand and Nacka Sångensemble)
- 2003 – Till min kära (together with Torbjörn Carlsson and text read by Thorwald Olsson)
- 2005 – Vinterhamn (together with Torbjörn Carlsson, Ted Ström, Marie J:son Lindh Nordenmalm and choirs from Nora)
- 2007 – Clarity (together with Torbjörn Carlsson and Malin Trast)
- 2008 – Samlat det bästa med Björn J:son Lindh – a compilation
- 2009 – Orgel (together with Marie J:son Lindh Nordenmalm and Katarina Andreasson)
- 2010 – Skymningsglöd (together with Torbjörn Carlsson, Malin Trast and Marie J:son Lindh Nordenmalm)
- 2011 – Jul i Nora (together with Marie J:son Lindh Nordenmalm, choirs and musicians from Nora)
- 2013 – LunchOrgel 12.12 (together with Marie J:son Lindh Nordenmalm)
- 2013 – I vinden (together with Olli Strömberg)
- 2013 – Blommorna (together with Stefan Blomquist, Torbjörn Carlsson and Dan Magnusson)

== Selected film music ==
- 1971: Niklas och Figuren
- 1974: En enkel melodi
- 1975: Lejonet och jungfrun
- 1976: Mannen på taket
- 1978: Dante – akta're för Hajen!
- 1982: Gräsänklingar
- 1984: Mannen från Mallorca
- 1985: Mask of Murder
- 1986: Bröderna Mozart
- 1988: Run for Your Life (also called Marathon)
- 1992: Den demokratiske terroristen
- 1994: Utmaningen
- 1996: Jägarna
- 1998: Cellophan
- 1999: Hälsoresan – En smal film av stor vikt (together with Janne Schaffer)
- 1999: Sjön
- 2004: Macbeth
- 2008: Vi hade i alla fall tur med vädret – igen!
- 2011: The Stig-Helmer Story (together with Janne Schaffer)
