= Janne Schaffer =

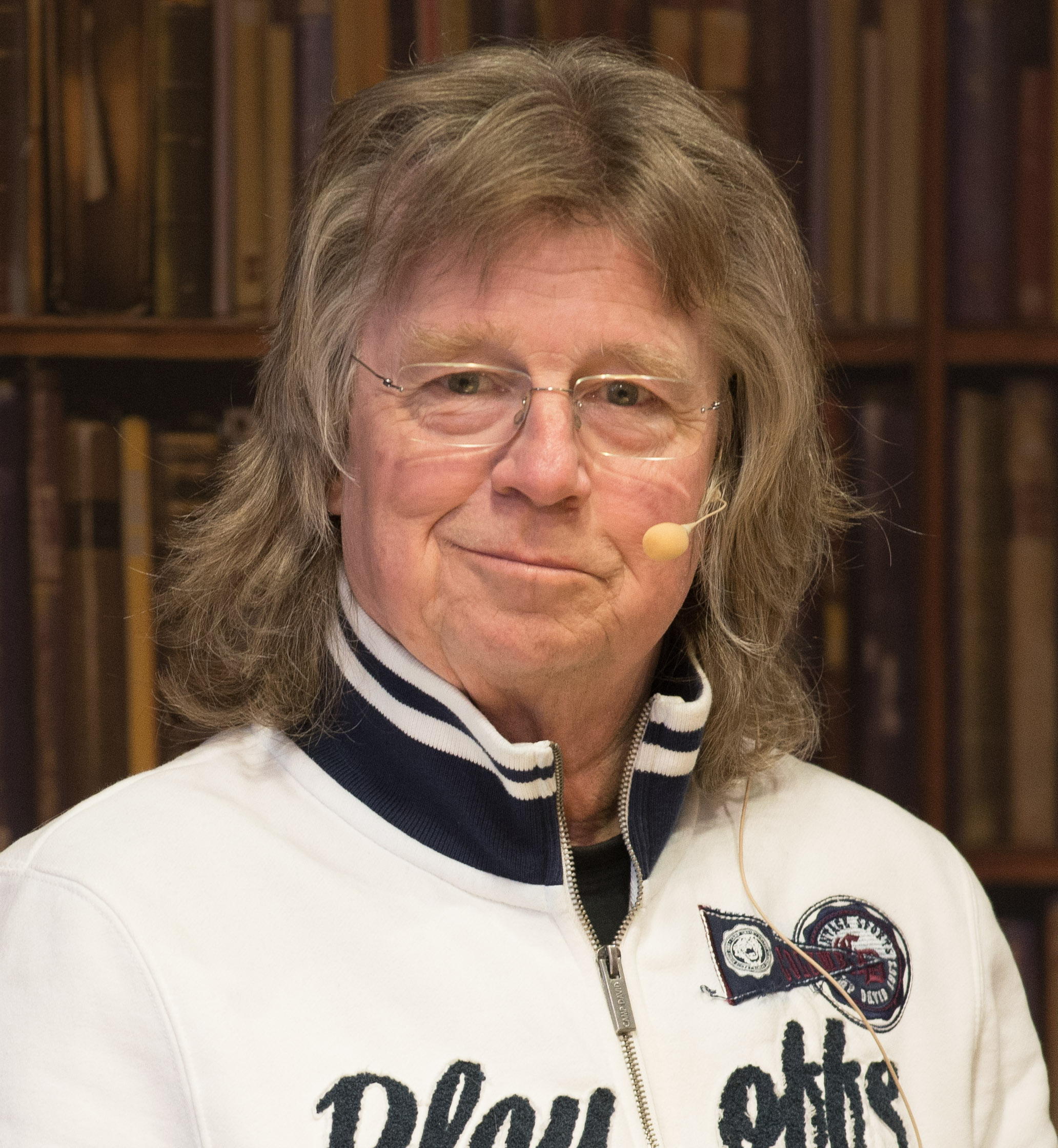
- Schaffer in 2015

Background information
- Birth name: Jan Erik Tage Schaffer
- Also known as: The Zebra
- Born: 24 September 1945 (age 79); Stockholm, Sweden
- Origin: Blackeberg, Bromma
- Genres: Rock; pop; jazz; reggae; funk; blues; schlager; synth-pop; progressive rock; classical music
- Occupation(s): Songwriter, musician
- Instrument: Guitar
- Years active: 1960s-present
- Website: http://www.janneschaffer.se/

Jan Erik Tage "Janne" Schaffer (born 24 September 1945) is a Swedish songwriter and guitarist. He is best known for his work as a session guitarist for ABBA but he has also recorded with artists such as Bob Marley, Johnny Nash, Art Farmer and Tony Williams. He also played at the 1977 Montreux Jazz Festival.

Schaffer's 1979 album Earmeal included session work from brothers Jeff, Steve and Mike Porcaro, as well as their father, Joe Porcaro. This is one of the few instances where the entire Porcaro family appears together on one album, the most well-known examples being Toto's Toto IV and The Seventh One.

Schaffer is a member of the Electric Banana Band where he plays guitar as the character 'Zebra'. He also performs with the group The Night Agent. Schaffer received the Albin Hagström Memorial Award in 1999 and in 2005 Illis quorum.

== Discography – albums ==
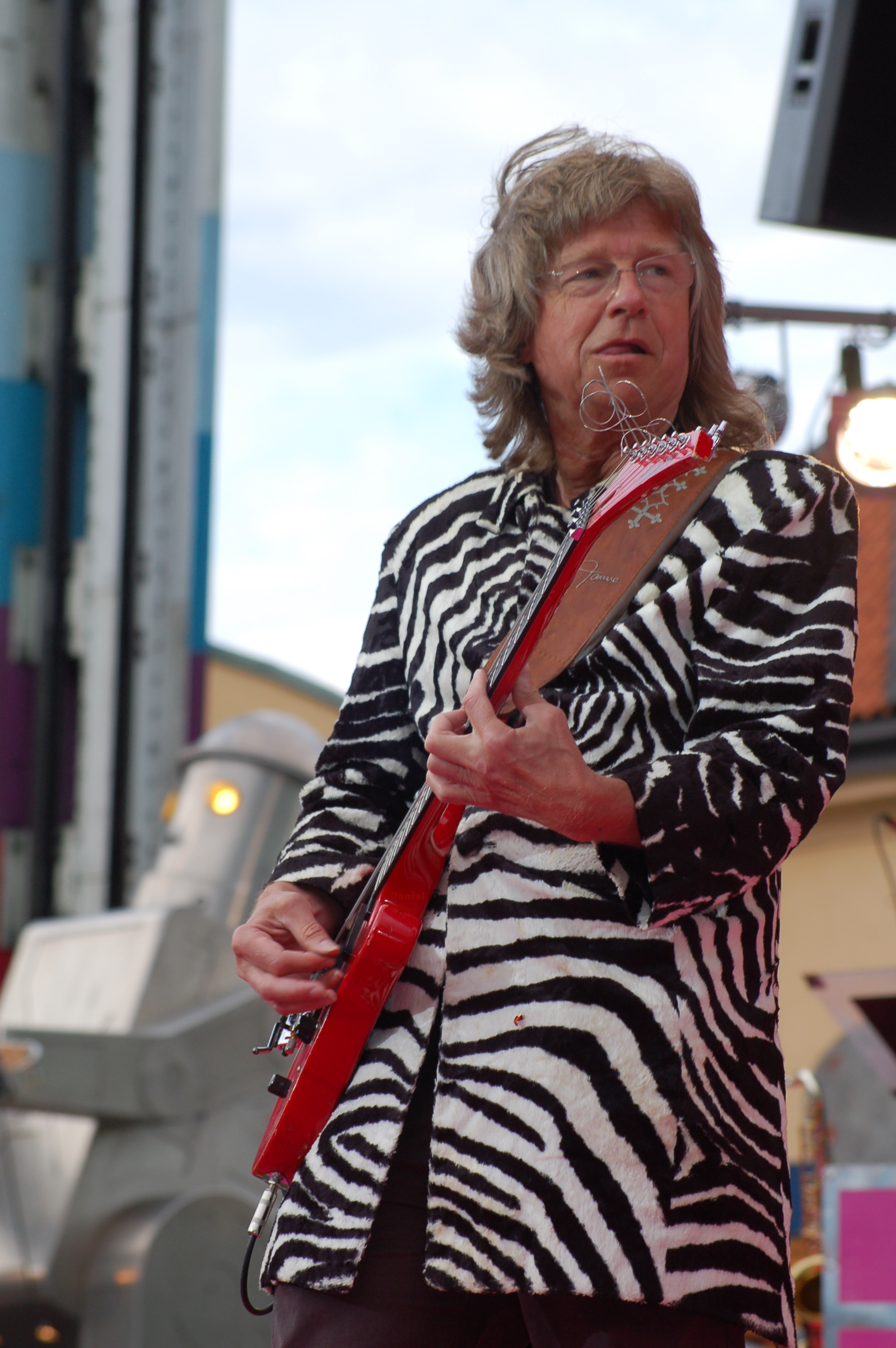
Schaffer with the Electric Banana Band in 2008

- 1973 – Janne Schaffer
- 1974 – Janne Schaffer's Andra LP
- 1974 – The Chinese
- 1976 – Katharsis
- 1978 – Earmeal
- 1980 – Presens
- 1982 – Blå Passager Och Röda Vågor
- 1985 – Traffic
- 1987 – Hörselmat med Gävleborgs Symfoniorkester
- 1988 – Electric Graffiti
- 1989 – Julglöd (with Leif Strand, Bo Westman and Nacka Sångensemble)
- 1989 – Katharsis & Earmeal Med Janne Schaffer 1976-1979 (compilation)
- 1990 – Tid Brusa (with Björn J:son Lindh and Gunnar Idenstam)
- 1992 – Ögonblick
- 1993 – Mellan Sol Och Måne 73-93 (compilation)
- 1995 – Av Ren Lust
- 1996 – Tunga Låtar 73-96 (compilation)
- 1996 – Lugna Låtar 80-95 (compilation)
- 2000 – Den Hela Människan (music from the movie Hälsoresan with Björn J:son Lindh and Electric Banana Band)
- 2000 – På Andra Sidan Månen
- 2002 – Nära i Sommarnatten (compilation)
- 2002 – Julglöd (with Björn J:son Lindh, Leif Strand and Nacka Sångensemble)
- 2004 – Överblick (compilation)
- 2005 – Med Betoning på Ljus (compilation)
- 2009 – Stämningsfullt - En Vinterresa (compilation)
- 2010 – Music Story (compilation box)
- 2013 – Musik / Schaffer Text / Åberg (with Lasse Åberg)
- 2023 – Janne Schaffer & Herr Allansson Band - Live!

== Soundtracks ==
- 1970 – Förpassad
- 1974 – Flossie
- 1979 – Repmånad eller Hur man gör pojkar av män
- 1998 – EBB the Movie – djungelns kojigaste rulle (with Lasse Åberg)
- 1999 – Hälsoresan – En smal film av stor vikt (with Björn J:son Lindh)
- 2011 – The Stig-Helmer story (with Björn J:son Lindh)

== Prog, fusion and jazz projects ==
- Svenska Löd AB: Hörselmat (1971)
- Gabor Szabo: Small World (1972)
- Gugge Hedrenius Big Blues Band: Blues of Sweden (1972)
- Anthony 'Reebop' Kwaku Bah: Anthony 'Reebop' Kwaku Bah (1973)
- Jazz Meeting 1. (1973)
- Rune Gustafsson: Killing Me Softly (1973)
- Pop Workshop: Vol. 1. (1973)
- Pop Workshop: Song of the Pterodactyl (1974)
- Gugge Hedrenius Big Blues Band: Blues of Stockholm (1974)
- Art Farmer: A Sleeping Bee (1974)
- Ablution: Ablution (1974)
- Rune Gustafsson: On A Clear Day (1976)
- Mads Vinding Group Featuring Janne Schaffer: Danish Design (1977)
- Various: Montreux Summit, Volume 1 (1977)
- Rune Gustafsson: Move (1977)
- Gabor Szabo: Belsta River (1979)
- Allen Vizzutti: Rainbow (1981)
- Oriental Wind: Bazaar (1981)
- Hector Bingert – Don Menza: El Encuentro (1983)
- Putte Wickman: Desire (1984)
- Urban Agnas: Bilder Från En Ö (1984)
- Putte Wickman: Mr Clarinet (1985)
- Lennart Åberg: Green Prints (1986)
- Leif Strand: 'New Age / De 12 Årstiderna' (1986)
- Andreas Vollenweider – Dancing with the Lion (1989)
- String Along With Basie: Rune Gustafsson Featuring Jan Schaffer, Georg Wadenius, Niels-Henning Ørsted Pedersen (1989)
- Isildurs Bane – The Voyage (A Trip To Elsewhere) (1992)
- Thomas Darelid – 10 Sånger Utan Sång (1992)
- Rune Gustafsson: Rune Gustafsson (1993)
- Isildurs Bane: Cheval – Volonté De Rocher (2002)
- Ola Melander Featuring Georg Wadenius, Janne Schaffer, Sofi Hellborg, Blue Marmelade Band: Blue Marmelade (2011)
- S-O-K, by Stany Van Wymeersch, Featuring Janne Schaffer and Susie Webb: Crazy World (2025)

== Awards and honours ==
- 1989 – Swedish Grammy (Grammis) for "Instrumental production of the year" with the album Electric Graffiti
- 1999 – Albin Hagström Memorial Award
- 2005 – Illis Quorum
- 2010 – S:t Eriksmedaljen
- 2023 – Litteris et Artibus
