= Kenneth Gärdestad =

Swedish songwriter, architect and activist (1948–2018)

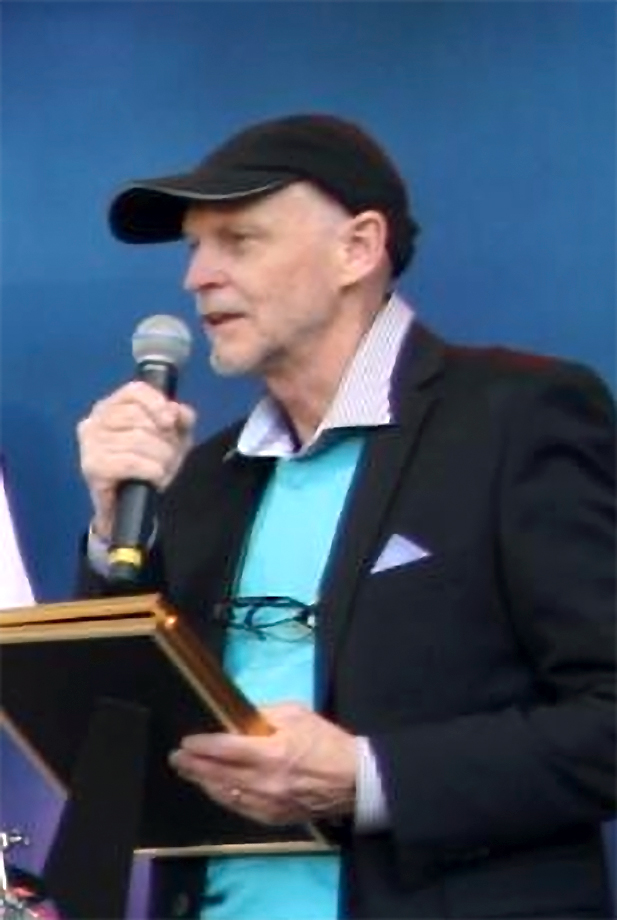
- Kenneth Gärdestad presenting the Ted Gärdestad Stipend, May 2016
- Born: John Charles Kenneth Gärdestad; 9 May 1948; Sollentuna, Sweden
- Died: 3 March 2018 (aged 69); Sollentuna, Sweden
- Occupation(s): Songwriter, lyricist, architect
- Musical career
- Genres: Soft rock, vispop
- Years active: 1970s–2018
- Labels: Polar

John Charles Kenneth Gärdestad (9 May 1948 – 3 March 2018) was a Swedish songwriter, best known for writing lyrics for the songs of his brother, Ted Gärdestad. He participated at Melodifestivalen 1979 as a songwriter for the winning song "Satellit" performed by his brother. The song went on to Eurovision the same year, where it placed 17th. Gärdestad was also an architect, affiliated to the private Kunskapsskolan, where he designed the interior of several of its high schools. Gärdestad published the biography Jag vill ha en egen måne in 2005. In later years he became a mental health activist, and created the "Ted Gärdestad Stipend", a prize awarded to amateur singers and songwriter.

== Music career ==
Gärdestad was a songwriter who co-wrote lyrics for many of his younger brother Ted Gärdestad's (1956–1997) songs. This included his Melodifestivalen song entries "Oh, vilken härlig dag" in 1973 and "Rockin' 'n' Reelin'" in 1975. As such, Gärdestad also won Melodifestivalen 1979 with Ted's song "Satellit". The song went on to represent Sweden in the Eurovision Song Contest 1979, finishing 17th during the final held in Jerusalem.

Gärdestad also competed in 2008 in the SVT music show Doobidoo along with Lotta Engberg. He took part again in Melodifestivalen in 2010, with lyrics for "Hur kan jag tro på kärlek?" performed by singer Erik Linder. The song placed fifth in the semi-final and was eliminated. In 2016, he was awarded the Musikförläggarnas pris, an honorary award for "many years of work for Swedish music and for creating timeless stories which he shares". In 2018, he won an honorary Grammis award, citing "his many years in the music industry and for his work in it, and many wonderful lyrics."

=== Tributes to his brother ===
Gärdestad, with Keijo Liimatainen, wrote Jag vill ha en egen måne (2005), a biography about his brother Ted and the circumstances surrounding his suicide in 1997. In 2018, a biographical film about his brother, Ted: För kärlekens skull, was released. Gärdestad took part in creating realistic scenes for the film and gave it his support. Peter Viitanen portrayed Kenneth Gärdestad in the film.

Gärdestad was a special guest on the show Så mycket bättre in 2016, which was broadcast on Swedish national television station TV4. The last episode of the 2016 season featured the season's chosen singers performing several of his brother's well-known hits, including "Helt nära dig" (interpreted by Little Jinder), "Sommarlängtan" (by Magnus Carlson), "Himlen är oskyldigt blå" (by Jill Johnson), "505 to Casablanca" (by Freddie Wadling), "Sol, vind och vatten" (by Lisa Ekdahl), "I den stora sorgens famn" (by Tommy Nilsson) and "För kärlekens skull" (by Danny Saucedo).

== Architecture work ==
Gärdestad was head architect at Kunskapsskolan from 2008 until his death, and designed many of the schools' rooms. Kunskapsskolan (literally The Knowledge School) is a Swedish network of independent schools that provides education for students from grades 4 to 9 (ages 10 to 16). It also provides gymnasium schools for grades 10 to 12 (ages 16 to 19) in different areas of Sweden. Designed by Gärdestad, the architecture is very open, with glass and colourfully painted walls.

== Activism ==
Gärdestad worked to educate and create understanding about psychological illness after his brother Ted's mental illness and suicide in 1997. He was the creator of the annual "Ted Gärdestad Stipend" awarded to amateur singers and songwriters since 1999 to promote their work. The prize includes a tribute concert.

== Personal life ==
Gärdestad's brother Ted was a noted Swedish singer, who represented Sweden in Eurovision with one of Kenneth's songs. Their other brother Kjell (1944–2000) was also a songwriter who co-wrote the song "Viking" with Ted.

== Death ==
Kenneth Gärdestad revealed in 2014 that he was suffering from skin cancer and latent lymphoma. He died on 3 March 2018, aged 69.

== Bibliography ==
- Gärdestad, Kenneth; Liimatainen, Keijo (2005). Jag vill ha en egen måne: boken om Ted Gärdestad [I want my own moon: The book about Ted Gärdestad] (in Swedish). Stockholm: Forum. ISBN 91-37-12733-0. SELIBR 9876123.

== Awards ==
- 2016 – Musikförläggarnas pris
- 2018 – Honorary Grammis award
