= The Singles: The First Ten Years =

Compilation album by ABBA
- Released: 8 November 1982
- Recorded: January 1973 – August 1982
- Genre: Pop
- Length: 92:44
- Labels: Polar (Sweden); Epic (UK, Ireland, Spain and Italy); Atlantic (US and Canada); Polydor (Germany and Netherlands); Vogue (France); RCA (Australia and New Zealand); Sunshine (South Africa)
- Producers: Benny Andersson; Björn Ulvaeus

ABBA chronology
The Visitors (1981)	The Singles: The First Ten Years (1982)	Thank You for the Music: A Collection of Love Songs (1983)
Voyage (2021)	The Singles: The First Fifty Years (2024)

Alternative cover
- The Singles: The First Fifty Years cover

Singles from The Singles: The First Ten Years
- 1. "The Day Before You Came" Released: 18 October 1982; 2. "Under Attack" Released: 3 December 1982

Professional ratings
Review scores
Source	Rating
AllMusic	4.5/5 stars
The Encyclopedia of Popular Music	4/5 stars
Rolling Stone	5/5 stars
Spin Alternative Record Guide	10/10

The Singles: The First Ten Years (re-released in 2024 as The Singles: The First Fifty Years) is a double compilation album by Swedish pop group ABBA, released on 8 November 1982. Issued as a double album of their most famous single A-sides, the collection included two new tracks: "The Day Before You Came" and "Under Attack". Both songs were released as singles, with "Cassandra" and "You Owe Me One" as their respective B-sides. The Singles: The First Ten Years would be ABBA's final album release while still active as a group (at least until 2021 after a reunion).

== Background and release ==
In May 1982, ABBA started work on what was meant to be their ninth studio album ended up only completing three songs: "You Owe Me One", "I Am The City" and "Just Like That". Benny Andersson and Björn Ulvaeus were not happy with the tracks and shelved the project in favor of a greatest hits album: The Singles: The First Ten Years. Released on 8 November 1982 in Sweden and four days later in the UK, it contained most of the band's hit singles from their ten years together as recording artists, and included two new tracks: "The Day Before You Came" and "Under Attack". A box set of the compilation was also released exclusively in the UK on 6 December 1982.

The Singles: The First Ten Years was released on CD in Canada only by Atlantic Records in 1987, but was quickly deleted in 1988 when Atlantic's rights to the catalog expired. In 2001, the album was replaced by The Definitive Collection. In the Spin Alternative Record Guide (1995), the compilation was ranked 80th on the book's list of the "Top 100 Alternative Albums".

Richard Cook in the New Musical Express described the collection as a "documentation of the group who altered the course of pop more than anyone else. It resulted in a seam of unbroken, highly individual pop music that in lifespan terms is still unmatched."

In September 2024, a new compilation was announced as an update to The Singles: The First Ten Years. Titled The Singles: The First Fifty Years, the 38-track collection not only contains the singles from Voyage (ABBA's latest studio album), but also includes ten extra tracks from the 1972–1982 period that were not included on the 1982 compilation. It was released on October 25, 2024, and issued as a 2-CD set and a 4LP 180g vinyl package. Both formats feature an illustrated booklet with unseen band images and liner notes by Carl Magnus Palm.

== Track listing ==
Released as a double album, the compilation was divided into two records.

=== Record one ===
All tracks are written by Benny Andersson, Björn Ulvaeus, and Stig Anderson, except where noted.

Side one
No.	Title	Writer(s)	Original album	Length
1.	"Ring Ring"	Andersson; Ulvaeus; Neil Sedaka; Anderson; Phil Cody	Ring Ring (1973)	3:05
2.	"Waterloo"		Waterloo (1974)	2:46
3.	"So Long"	Andersson; Ulvaeus	ABBA (1975)	3:07
4.	"I Do, I Do, I Do, I Do, I Do"		ABBA	3:18
5.	"SOS"		ABBA	3:23
6.	"Mamma Mia"		ABBA	3:33
7.	"Fernando"		Greatest Hits (1975)	4:13

Side two
No.	Title	Writer(s)	Original album	Length
1.	"Dancing Queen"		Arrival (1976)	3:51
2.	"Money, Money, Money"	Andersson; Ulvaeus	Arrival	3:08
3.	"Knowing Me, Knowing You"		Arrival	4:02
4.	"The Name of the Game"		ABBA: The Album (1977)	4:00
5.	"Take a Chance on Me"	Andersson; Ulvaeus	ABBA: The Album	4:02
6.	"Summer Night City"	Andersson; Ulvaeus	Greatest Hits Vol. 2 (1979)	3:30
Total length:				46:46

=== Record two ===
All tracks are written by Benny Andersson and Björn Ulvaeus.

Side three
No.	Title	Original album	Length
1.	"Chiquitita"	Voulez-Vous (1979)	5:24
2.	"Does Your Mother Know"	Voulez-Vous	3:15
3.	"Voulez-Vous"	Voulez-Vous	5:07
4.	"Gimme! Gimme! Gimme! (A Man After Midnight)"	Greatest Hits Vol. 2	4:49
5.	"I Have a Dream"	Voulez-Vous	4:41

Side four
No.	Title	Original album	Length
1.	"The Winner Takes It All"	Super Trouper (1980)	4:54
2.	"Super Trouper"	Super Trouper	4:12
3.	"One of Us"	The Visitors (1981)	3:55
4.	"The Day Before You Came"	Previously unreleased (1982)	5:48
5.	"Under Attack"	Previously unreleased (1982)	3:40
Total length:			45:58

=== The Singles: The First Fifty Years track listing ===
All songs written by Benny Andersson and Björn Ulvaeus, except where noted. Tracks 1–4 were first released by the band as "Björn & Benny, Agnetha & Anni-Frid".

Disc one
No.	Title	Writer(s)	Original album	Length
1.	"People Need Love"		Ring Ring	2:44
2.	"He Is Your Brother"		Ring Ring	3:19
3.	"Ring Ring"	Andersson; Stig Anderson; Ulvaeus; Neil Sedaka; Phil Cody	Ring Ring	3:06
4.	"Love Isn't Easy (But It Sure Is Hard Enough)"		Ring Ring	2:55
5.	"Waterloo"	Andersson; Anderson; Ulvaeus	Waterloo	2:46
6.	"Honey, Honey"	Andersson; Anderson; Ulvaeus	Waterloo	2:57
7.	"Hasta Mañana"	Andersson; Anderson; Ulvaeus	Waterloo	3:11
8.	"So Long"		ABBA	3:07
9.	"I Do, I Do, I Do, I Do, I Do"	Andersson; Anderson; Ulvaeus	ABBA	3:17
10.	"SOS"	Andersson; Anderson; Ulvaeus	ABBA	3:23
11.	"Mamma Mia"	Andersson; Anderson; Ulvaeus	ABBA	3:32
12.	"Fernando"		Greatest Hits	4:14
13.	"Dancing Queen"	Andersson; Anderson; Ulvaeus	Arrival	3:53
14.	"Money, Money, Money"		Arrival	3:06
15.	"Knowing Me, Knowing You"	Andersson; Anderson; Ulvaeus	Arrival	4:03
16.	"The Name of the Game"	Andersson; Anderson; Ulvaeus	ABBA: The Album	4:52
17.	"Take a Chance on Me"		ABBA: The Album	4:04
18.	"Eagle"		ABBA: The Album	5:49
19.	"Summer Night City"		Greatest Hits Vol. 2	3:35
20.	"Chiquitita"		Voulez-Vous	5:27
21.	"Does Your Mother Know"		Voulez-Vous	3:15

Disc two
No.	Title	Original album	Length
1.	"Voulez-Vous"	Voulez-Vous	5:10
2.	"Angeleyes"	Voulez-Vous	4:22
3.	"Gimme! Gimme! Gimme! (A Man After Midnight)"	Greatest Hits, Vol. 2	4:50
4.	"I Have a Dream"	Voulez-Vous	4:44
5.	"The Winner Takes It All"	Super Trouper	4:57
6.	"Super Trouper"	Super Trouper	4:10
7.	"Lay All Your Love on Me"	Super Trouper	4:34
8.	"One of Us"	The Visitors	3:57
9.	"Head over Heels"	The Visitors	3:49
10.	"When All Is Said and Done"	The Visitors	3:18
11.	"The Day Before You Came"	The Singles: The First Ten Years (1982)	5:50
12.	"Under Attack"	The Singles: The First Ten Years	3:47
13.	"I Still Have Faith in You"	Voyage (2021)	5:09
14.	"Don't Shut Me Down"	Voyage	3:57
15.	"Just a Notion"	Voyage	3:32
16.	"Little Things"	Voyage	3:10
17.	"No Doubt About It"	Voyage	2:51

== Personnel ==
ABBA

- Agnetha Fältskog – lead vocals (5, 14, 17, 19, 21, 22, 23), co-lead vocals (1, 2, 3, 4, 6, 8, 11, 12, 13, 15, 16), backing vocals
- Anni-Frid Lyngstad – lead vocals (7, 9, 10, 18, 20), co-lead vocals (1, 2, 3, 4, 6, 8, 11, 12, 13, 15, 16), backing vocals
- Björn Ulvaeus – steel-string, acoustic guitar, lead vocals (13, 15), backing vocals
- Benny Andersson – synthesizer, keyboards, backing vocals

Additional personnel

- Ulf Andersson – saxophone
- Ola Brunkert – drums
- Lars Carlsson – horn
- Christer Eklund – saxophone
- Malando Gassama – percussion
- Anders Glenmark – guitar
- Rutger Gunnarsson – bass
- Roger Palm – drums
- Janne Schaffer – guitar
- Åke Sundqvist – percussion
- Mike Watson – bass
- Lasse Wellander – guitar

Production

- Benny Andersson – producer, arranger
- Björn Ulvaeus – producer, arranger
- Michael B. Tretow – engineer
- Lars Larsson – cover photo
- Anders Hanser, Ola Lager, Lars Larsson – inner sleeve photo
- Rune Söderqvist – art director

== Charts ==
=== Weekly charts ===
Chart (1982)	Peak position
Australian Albums (Kent Music Report)	18
Belgian Albums (Ultratop Flanders)	1
Canadian Albums (RPM)	24
Dutch Albums (Album Top 100)	5
Finnish Albums (Suomen virallinen lista)	9
French Albums (SNEP)	6
German Albums (Offizielle Top 100)	5
New Zealand Albums (RMNZ)	5
Norwegian Albums (VG-lista)	33
South African Albums (RISA)	1
Swedish Albums (Sverigetopplistan)	29
Swiss Albums (Swiss Hitparade)	4
UK Albums (Official Charts)	1
US Billboard 200	62

Chart performance for The Singles: The First Fifty Years
Chart (2024)	Peak position
Australian Albums (ARIA)	42
Austrian Albums (Ö3 Austria)	12
Belgian Albums (Ultratop Flanders)	8
Belgian Albums (Ultratop Wallonia)	28
Dutch Albums (Album Top 100)	12
French Albums (SNEP)	35
German Albums (Offizielle Top 100)	5
Irish Albums (Official Charts)	17
Swedish Physical Albums (Sverigetopplistan)	7
Scottish Albums (Official Charts)	19
Swiss Albums (Schweizer Hitparade)	10
UK Albums (Official Charts)	17
UK Album Downloads (Official Charts)	24

=== Year-end charts ===
Chart (1983)	Position
German Albums (Offizielle Top 100)	51

== Certifications ==
Region	Certification	Certified units/sales
Australia (ARIA)	Gold	20,000^{^}
Germany (BVMI)	Gold	250,000^{^}
United Kingdom (BPI)	Platinum	300,000^{^}
^{^} Shipments figures based on certification alone.

== Release history ==
Region	Date	Format(s)	Label	Ref.
Various	8 November 1982	CD; Cassette; LP; 8-track cartridge	Various	
United Kingdom	12 November 1982	Cassette; LP	Epic	
