= Virtual concert =

Performance with virtual avatars

A virtual concert, also called V-concert or virtual live, refers to a performance in which the performers are represented by virtual avatars. Virtual concerts can take place in real life, where digital representations of the performers are projected on stage, or within fully digital virtual worlds. Performers in virtual concerts may represent real individuals, but can also be entirely fictitious characters.

Real-life virtual concerts are seen globally, for instance in South Korea where hologram performances by groups such as Girls' Generation have attracted thousands of fans, or in London with the ABBA Voyage concert residency selling over 1 million tickets in both 2023 and 2024.

More recently, virtual concerts have taken place in video games. Games like Fortnite Battle Royale, Roblox, and Minecraft have been used by artists as venues to reach wider audiences and offer interactive experiences for attendees.

Virtual concerts have received various reactions from audience members, with some arguing that they are financially motivated and take away from the traditional live concert experience. Others raised ethical concerns with holograms of deceased artists. Those who enjoy virtual concerts appreciate its use of visual effects and accessibility.

== History ==
=== Early beginnings ===
Within the K-pop music industry, V-concerts were first introduced by several South Korean record labels such as SM Entertainment and YG Entertainment. In 1998, SM Entertainment attempted to kick start its first holographic debut with H.O.T. (a now-defunct boy band), but failed to do so.

Since the 2000s, a combination of an old stage technique called Pepper’s Ghost and modern visual effects technologies has been used to place hologram-like portrayals of artists and animated characters on stage.

At the 2006 Grammy Awards, the virtual band Gorillaz performed live using holograms of their animated characters. Projected on stage using transparent screens, the holograms performed “Hung Up” alongside Madonna and “Feel Good Inc.” with De La Soul, blending real-life performers with virtual ones.

In 2009, Japanese virtual idol Hatsune Miku held her first live performance using semi-holographic technology developed by Crypton Future Media, in which the idol’s projected image was transported between three on-stage transparent screens as she performed. Since then, her concert technology has evolved to use layered screens and multiple projections to produce a 3-D effect.

=== Live virtual concerts ===
In 2012, 15 years after his death, a 2D image of Tupac was projected using the Pepper’s Ghost effect at Coachella, allowing the other performers to walk around the projection and seemingly interact with him. He was programmed to engage with the Coachella audience and reference the festival as he spoke, despite dying a few years before the festival was established in 1999.

Within the same year across the world, South Korea's SM Entertainment hosted the S.M.ART Exhibition in August 2012 to showcase the various ways technology can be used in entertainment. The event included a live performance by SHINee featuring 2D illusions of the band members.

On January 5, 2013, SM Entertainment also held a virtual concert in Gangnam District with life-sized images of Girls’ Generation projected onto the stage, attracting thousands of K-pop fans. The company discussed opening a V Theater, or virtual reality theatre for hologram performances, yet the theater never opened.

Meanwhile, after its first virtual concert featuring Psy's "Gangnam Style" took off at the COEX Convention & Exhibition Center in May 2013, the South Korean record label YG Entertainment announced that it plans to establish 20 venues for virtual performances of its K-pop singers by the year 2015 in North America, Europe, China, Hong Kong, Singapore and Thailand.

On July 20, 2013, YG Entertainment launched a permanent virtual concert at the Everland theme park in Yongin, South Korea. Under the slogan "K-Pop Hologram: YG at Everland", virtual performances include Psy's "Gentleman" and "Gangnam Style" as well as virtual concerts by Big Bang and 2NE1.

Back in the United States, Michael Jackson was “revived” for the 2014 Billboard Music Awards using the Pepper's Ghost effect once again. This production also included an impersonator, a scan of a 1997 mold of Jackson’s face, detailed costuming, special effects, and more to ensure accuracy of the Jackson's virtual counterpart.

The same year, M.I.A. and Janelle Monáe used the effect to "appear" at each other’s respective concerts in New York and Los Angeles, yet they did not attempt to look realistic; rather, they were projected as technological “holograms,” splitting into two figures and reuniting throughout the performance. Since then, Jenni Rivera's image was projected at a 2016 Day of the Dead event in Los Angeles, and Juan Gabriel was made a "hologram" in a 2017 performance shortly after his death.

On May 27, 2022, the Swedish pop group ABBA began the ABBA Voyage, a virtual concert residency. The concerts feature virtual avatars (dubbed 'ABBAtars'), depicting the group as they appeared in 1979, and using vocals re-recorded by the group specifically for the show, accompanied by a live instrumental band on stage. The concerts are held in ABBA Arena, a purpose-built venue near the Queen Elizabeth Olympic Park in London. The digital versions of ABBA have been created with motion capture and performance techniques with the four band members and the visual effects company Industrial Light & Magic as the company’s first foray into music.

On December 2, 2023, Kiss unveiled their digital avatars at the end of their final concert at Madison Square Garden in New York. While the four members of Kiss had left the stage, the avatars performed a song on-screen. The performance ended with the text "A NEW ERA BEGINS". The avatars were also designed by Industrial Light & Magic (ILM) and used to announce a partnership with Pophouse Entertainment to produce a future virtual concert residency similar to ABBA Voyage.

=== In video games and virtual worlds ===
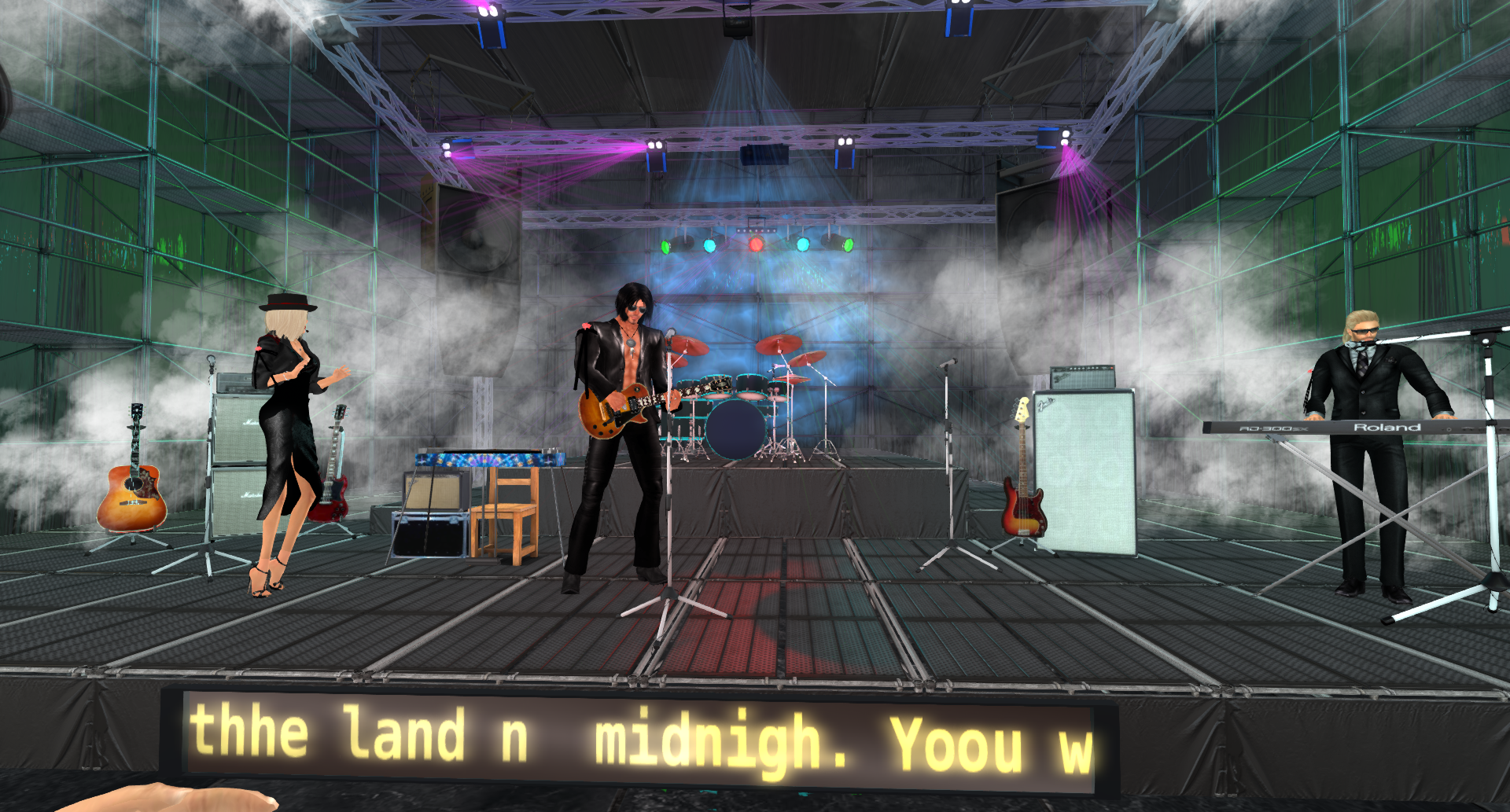
A concert performance in Second Life

Since the mid-2000s, virtual concerts have also been held in virtual worlds instead of physical locations. The first major band to perform live in a virtual world was Duran Duran, who performed in Second Life in 2006. Another early Second Life concert claiming to be the "world's first virtual concert" was the Royal Liverpool Philharmonic Orchestra's 2007 performance, viewed by 100 randomly chosen Second Life users. In the same year, Phil Collins appeared in Grand Theft Auto: Vice City Stories performing his single "In The Air Tonight"; the concert is accessible as part of the game.

In January 2019, a virtual music festival called Fire Festival (named as a play on the infamous 2017 Fyre Festival) was held on a dedicated Minecraft server. Organized by Canadian producer Max Schramp, the event was held in support of LGBT suicide prevention organization The Trevor Project. The following month, on February 2, EDM producer Marshmello held a ten-minute concert on the main map of Fortnite Battle Royale. The concert was viewable to anyone playing the game during that time, and a special variant of its "Team Rumble" game mode with respawns enabled was provided for the event.

Virtual concerts grew in popularity through 2020 and 2021 due to restrictions set by the COVID-19 pandemic that made it difficult to hold traditional concerts. More concerts were held in Fortnite featuring artists including Travis Scott, BTS, Diplo, and Ariana Grande as interactive experiences. Fortnite would continue to host virtual concerts on a smaller and more social-oriented side map called "Party Royale". On April 16, 2020, American singer-songwriter Soccer Mommy collaborated with Club Penguin Rewritten fangame to host an in-game concert for her album Color Theory. Roblox hosted in-game concerts by Lil Nas X, Zara Larsson, and Twenty One Pilots, where the last concert allowed users to choose the setlist order and engage in a live chat with the band after the show.

Many virtual performances have also leveraged virtual and augmented reality. TheWave, a dedicated platform for virtual reality concerts, launched in 2017. Artists who have performed on the platform include Imogen Heap, The Glitch Mob, and Kill the Noise; the service shut down in 2021, with the company stating that it was focusing on distributing its productions via "popular streaming platforms" instead. On the virtual world platform VRChat, a number of groups have organized digital nightclubs and music festivals with live streamed performances (ranging from community members, to established producers such as Jean-Michel Jarre and Muzz), hosted in specially-designed worlds on the platform. Many of these worlds are designed to mimic real-life venues, but some are designed as artistic experiences. A February 2026 virtual concert during Sanrio VFes to promote the anime film Cosmic Princess Kaguya! caused VRChat to set a new concurrent user record of 156,700 overall.

In August 2020, Canadian singer the Weeknd collaborated with social media platform TikTok to hold an interactive augmented reality live stream titled "The Weeknd Experience" on various dates, with the first occurring on August 7, 2020. Tomorrowland replaced its in-person festival with a virtual event known as "Tomorrowland Around the World", which featured filmed DJ performances composited into 3D stage environments rendered using Unreal Engine, and combined with simulated crowd noise and virtual spectators to create the footage for each performer.

On July 14, 2023, the company named AMAZE launched their VR concert application, featuring real footage of artists in virtual worlds created using Unreal Engine. The app currently offers access to free songs, as well as the option to purchase full VR concerts featuring artists like Megan Thee Stallion, Upsahl, Ceraadi, Zara Larsson, and T-Pain. In 2024, SM Entertainment partnered with AMAZE to develop a studio in Seoul to produce VR concerts.

On August 25, 2023, Sky: Children of the Light held an in-game concert featuring Norwegian singer Aurora; it set a world record for the most concurrent users on a single server a metaverse concert, at 10,061 users.

On October 27, 2023, Sensorium premiered a show developed in collaboration with Carl Cox. The 30-minute show, titled 'Intermundium,' showcases tracks created, produced, and performed by Carl Cox, who is represented through his avatar taking center stage during the performance. The show was made available in VR, VR-360 and 2D formats.

On December 2, 2023, Fortnite held an in-game event known as "The Big Bang" to launch the Chapter 5 update, with Eminem briefly making an appearance during an interactive rhythm game segment of the event that was used to unveil Fortnite Festival.

On January 17, 2026, Bruno Mars held a virtual concert on Roblox that drew over 12.8 million users and over 53 million views on related social media content. This event, staged within the "Steal a Brainrot" minigame, featured Mars' avatar and performed his new single, "I Just Might." During Mars' performance, fans were able to collect themed items a special "Brunito Marsito" character.

== Production costs ==
Production costs vary between types of virtual concerts, but specific cases provide examples of what funding these experiences may look like.

The 2012 ten-day S.M.ART Exhibition cost SE Entertainment 5.6 billion South Korean won, or $4.9 million to produce, while the 2013 virtual Girls' Generation concert cost around 200 million won, or over $180,000, per hologram.

Tomorrowland's 2020 virtual concert, "Tomorrowland Around the World," cost around $10 million to produce including the costs of paying artists for the gig, develop the digital stages, and more.

The ABBA Voyage hologram show cost the band £140 million, or around $175 million to produce. To maximize income and recoup these costs through ticket sales, the show is scheduled to run least seven times a week until its London lease expires in 2026.

AmazeVR, the virtual reality concert production company, had raised about $30.8 million by early 2022 after securing $15 million in funding from different investment companies.

== Reactions ==
=== Positive reactions ===
Some fans of virtual concerts appreciate the seemingly unlimited capabilities of virtual performances. A study on the motivations to attend virtual world concerts found that the most influential factor in attending such events is their unique capabilities, including immersion in imaginary worlds, artistic displays, close-ups of performers, and more.

Others argued that virtual concerts that take place in virtual worlds eliminate the socioeconomic barriers that may emerge in live music settings, and expand accessibility to those who may not be able to physically attend shows, as users socialize via avatars.

Meanwhile, some who reacted to ABBA Voyage saw the hologram performance as innovative and exciting. They admired the immortalization of ABBA through their holographic counterparts, and many fans were excited to see ABBA again for the first time since the 1970s.

Andrew Webster writing for The Verge, described Travis Scott's Fortnite concert as "surreal and spectacular", showing how virtual concerts can go beyond traditional concerts and will only become more immersive in the future.

=== Negative reactions ===
Other ABBA fans, however, were not as pleased with the ABBA hologram show. Some argued that the 'ABBAtars' appeared disturbing and eerie, citing the uncanny valley effect. Others saw the show as inauthentic without human performers and motivated by financial gain.

Viewers of Tupac’s 2012 hologram performance at during Dr. Dre and Snoop Dogg's Coachella set raised ethical concerns regarding the revival of deceased artists for performances. Some were uncomfortable that the hologram addressed Coachella directly, as Tupac had died years before it existed, and believed it exploited his image. Others thought it was scary, while some were confused by its realistic quality and questioned whether or not he was alive.

A critique of video game concerts argued that in-game concert experiences are purely driven by commercial incentives, as the concerts drive users to spend more on in-game items related to the artist performing and increase exposure to the game. Additionally, they claimed that the opportunity to perform virtually is only offered to popular artists, putting smaller artists’ at a disadvantage.

Virtual concerts have also been criticized by K-pop fans because singers do not appear in person and are only electronically projected onto a screen. Some claim that V-concerts could possibly endanger the quality of live music.

Marc Hogan writing for Pitchfork, noted limitations of virtual concerts for smaller artists that are not represented or have less of a following. Hogan wrote about how virtual performances can cause "financial and creative challenges" for artists trying to break into the digital concert space.

== Legal requirements for hologram concerts ==
Multiple legal clearances are required to produce hologram V-concerts.

Hologram performances require clearance of copyrighted works by the artist to avoid copyright infringement. Choreography, videos, images, compositions, and sound recordings used in production must be licensed by the company developing the hologram. The compositions and recordings of each song used in the hologram’s performances must also be cleared for use by the copyright holder(s), which could be the artist, their estate, their record label, publisher, or others.

Within the United States, personality rights grant individuals the exclusive right to control the use of their identity. In order to produce a hologram of an artist and profit from it, developers need access to the artist’s personality rights.

For example, Kiss sold its song catalog, as well as its name, image, and likeness rights to Pophouse Entertainment for over $300 million as a step in developing a hologram show similar to ABBA Voyage. Now, Pophouse has the authority to use Kiss’s music and band identity to produce holograms and profit from their work.

== See also ==
- 2.5D musical
- Metaverse
- Virtual band
- Virtual event
- Hologram
- Pepper's ghost
- Virtual reality
