= Pophouse Entertainment =

Swedish company

- Type: Private
- Industry: Entertainment; Music
- Founded: 2014; 12 years ago
- Founders: Conni Jonsson, Björn Ulvaeus
- Headquarters: Stockholm, Sweden
- Area served: Worldwide
- Key people: Jessica Koravos (CEO); Per Sundin; Steve Barnett (Investment Advisory Committee ) Catherine Powell (Board of Directors); Johan Lagerlöf (Investments division)
- Services: Music publishing, brands development, hospitality, investments
- Website: pophouse.se

Pophouse Entertainment is a private entertainment company based in Stockholm, Sweden. The company creates, acquires, and develops brands in various related fields, such as music, podcasting, stage performance, and gaming. Pophouse invests in music rights, as well as other types of intellectual property in the entertainment industry. Founded in 2014 by Conni Jonsson and Björn Ulvaeus, it has since been affiliated with many of Sweden's most notable entertainment brands including ABBA, Swedish House Mafia and Avicii, among others. Jessica Koravos currently serves as the group's CEO.

== History ==
Pophouse Entertainment (also known as Pophouse) was established in 2014 in Stockholm, Sweden by Björn Ulvaeus, a founding member of the musical group ABBA, and Conni Jonsson, founder of EQT AB. From 2019 to 2025, the CEO of Pophouse was Per Sundin, who was previously CEO of Universal Music in the Nordics and instrumental in the emergence of Spotify, as the first music label executive to partner with the streaming platform. He was succeeded by Jessica Koravos, who has served as CEO since 2026.

On 25 February 2022, the company opened the Avicii Experience, an interactive museum in Stockholm, and a tribute to Tim Bergling's music and life. The opening ceremony was inaugurated by the Swedish royal family.

In March 2022, Pophouse Entertainment acquired the master recordings of the band Swedish House Mafia.

In April 2022, Pophouse recruited James Mcknight, previously creative director of the Harry Potter franchise, as head of entertainment research and development, and also opened their first office in London.

In February 2024, Pophouse acquired the majority of Cyndi Lauper's music catalogue for new projects to promote her legacy.

== Funding and acquisitions ==
In September 2021, the company bought Perfect Day Media AB, a media house founded in 2011, that develops and produces podcasts for various media platforms.

In 2022, Pophouse announced they would move into music catalogue investments. According to Bloomberg, "Pophouse is raising a music fund with a target size of up to $1 billion USD, similar to that of Hipgnosis and Round Hill Music Royalty Fund. However, Pophouse has not yet confirmed that claim."

Pophouse is founding investor of ABBA Voyage, a concert residency by the Swedish pop group ABBA. The concerts feature ABBA as virtual avatars (dubbed 'ABBAtars'), depicting the group as they appeared in 1979. The concerts are held in a purpose-built venue at the Queen Elizabeth Olympic Park in London, officially called ABBA Arena.

In April 2024, it was reported that Pophouse has bought the hard rock band Kiss for $300 million, including all of their songs along with their brand and intellectual property.

In October 2026, Pophouse acquired a 50% stake in music catalog of singer-songwriter Sia for $180 million, covering both her publishing and master recording rights. The acquisition is structured as a collaborative partnership to co-develop new projects and immersive experiences based on her biggest hits.

== Notable projects and collaborations ==
- ABBA Voyage
- Swedish House Mafia
- Avicii Experience
- Space
- Perfect Day Media
- Mamma Mia The Party
- Pippi at the Cirkus
- ABBA The Museum
- Fat Cat brasserie
- Kiss Avatars, songs and brand
- Iron Maiden

== Key people ==
- Jesica Koravos - CEO
- Per Sundin - (former CEO of Universal Music Sweden and Nordics)
- Johan Lagerlöf - Managing Partner of the Investments Division (previously, founder and CEO of X5 Music Group)
- Catherine Powell - Board of Directors (currently also serving as head of hosting at Airbnb)
- Steve Barnett (music executive) - Investment Advisory Committee (previously CEO and chairman of Capitol Records and Columbia Records)
