= ABBA: Thank You for the Music, An All-Star Tribute =

Cancelled television special

- Genre: Special
- Directed by: Johan Renck
- Countries of origin: United States; United Kingdom; Sweden
- Original language: English

Production
- Executive producer: Simon Fuller
- Producer: Johan Renck
- Running time: 120 minutes
- Production company: XIX Entertainment

Original release
- Network: NBC (US); BBC One (UK); SVT1 (Sweden)
- Release: 2021 (cancelled)

ABBA: Thank You for the Music, An All-Star Tribute was intended to be an American-British television special tribute to the Swedish band ABBA set for release in 2021 on NBC and BBC One. The special was later cancelled, as efforts switched to developing the ABBA Voyage concert residency.

== Premise ==
It would have featured appearances by Agnetha Fältskog, Björn Ulvaeus, Benny Andersson, and Anni-Frid Lyngstad and a performance of their new song "I Still Have Faith in You" by their digital avatars, and also included appearances by a variety of musical artists performing ABBA songs such as "Dancing Queen," "Mamma Mia," "The Winner Takes It All," and "Take a Chance on Me."

== Production ==
On April 27, 2018, it was announced that NBC and the BBC were co-producing a television special tribute to Swedish band ABBA. The special is set to be directed and produced by Johan Renck and executive produced by Simon Fuller. Production companies involved with the special include Fuller's XIX Entertainment. On May 4, 2018, it was announced that the special had been titled ABBA: Thank You for the Music, An All-Star Tribute.

Work on the TV special inspired the band to record new music, which later developed into their album Voyage, their first in 40 years. According to Andersson, "I said, if we would have been doing this for real, going out on the stage, we would have added a couple of new songs to perform. And then I called the ladies and they said yes. [...] So we did that and I thought with the first two songs, it went so well and they could still sing and we could still produce music in the studio so we said maybe we’ll do a couple of others while we’re at it, and we ended up doing a whole album".

In October 2021, it was confirmed that the special was scrapped, in favor of the upcoming ABBA Voyage concert residency.
