= You Owe Me One =

Song by ABBA

from the album The Visitors (2012 Reissue)
- A-side: "Under Attack"
- Released: 3 December 1982
- Recorded: May 1982
- Genre: Dance-pop
- Length: 3:28
- Label: Polar Music
- Songwriters: Benny Andersson; Björn Ulvaeus
- Producers: Benny Andersson; Björn Ulvaeus

ABBA singles chronology
"The Day Before You Came" (1982)	"You Owe Me One" (1982)	"Thank You for the Music" (1983)

Audio video
- "You Owe Me One" on YouTube

"You Owe Me One" (working title: "Kamelo") is a song recorded by Swedish pop group ABBA in 1982 for their unfinished ninth album. It was released as a B-side for the group's last single — "Under Attack" and on the 1997 and 2012 remasters of The Visitors. It was excluded from the 2001 remaster due to the group's songwriters critical attitude towards "You Owe Me One". The vocal is shared by Anni-Frid Lyngstad, and Agnetha Fältskog singing in unison. For nearly four decades, "You Owe Me One" had stood as the last new song to be released by ABBA as an active group, until the 2021 release of "I Still Have Faith in You" and "Don't Shut Me Down" as a dual single from the band's ninth studio album and first in 40 years, Voyage.

== History ==
The song's recording sessions started on 3 May 1982. This single was recorded along with two other ABBA songs — "I Am the City" and "Just Like That". These two songs were kept unreleased until the mid 1990s, when "Just Like That" was edited and released as a promo single for the "Thank You For The Music" box set and "I Am The City" was released as a part of the "More Gold: More Hits" album. It has been noted that Benny Andersson and Björn Ulvaeus dislike the song due to it being "just a jingle".
