= Studio Realive =

South Korean metaverse content production company

- Native name: 스튜디오 리얼라이브
- Industry: Production
- Founded: July 12, 2022; 3 years ago
- Headquarters: South Korea
- Key people: Lee Seung-woo (CEO)
- Services: Metaverse
- Parent: SM Entertainment
- Subsidiaries: Studio A; Studio Clon (51%)
- Website: studio-realive.com

Studio Realive (Korean: 스튜디오 리얼라이브) is a South Korean metaverse content production company established by SM Entertainment. It specializes in post-production, VFX production, virtual human, VR production, music video studio, and virtual studio. The company was formed to differentiate metaverse content based on the culture technology SM has accumulated. It has established a joint venture with AMAZE to form Studio A and has recently acquired Studio Clon.

== History ==
Studio Kwangya logo

On July 12, 2022, SM Entertainment announced that it had established Studio Kwangya, a company specializing in metaverse content production technology. The company's business areas are post-production, VFX production, virtual human, VR production, music video studio, and virtual studio. These business areas are established through joint ventures with top domestic and foreign-related businesses, mergers and acquisitions, and recruiting "talented" people. Lee Sung-soo and Tak Young-jun stated that the company's establishment specialized in "differentiated" metaverse content based on the culture technology (CT) SM has "accumulated" to date. An official from the company noted that "international entertainment companies based on diverse genres had expressed interest" in SM Culture Universe (SMCU) and are "promoting a metaverse content production partnership based on the content production technology and capabilities" of the company.

It was then reported that AMAZE had established a joint venture with Studio Kwangya. The two companies had founded Studio A, a global VR concert production company. As SM is carrying out a business that incorporates virtual reality into artist activities, the establishment of the joint venture is planned to showcase different collaborations with artists throughout K-pop in the VR metaverse environment. On April 26, 2023, SM announced that it had secured a 51% stake in Studio Clon through Studio Kwangya on April 19 and made it the company's new subsidiary. Studio Clon was acquired to "reinforce [the company's] metaverse and content capabilities," implement SM 3.0 business strategies, and "enhance its virtual IP rights" by combining Studio Clon's technology with the virtual human and visual special effects technologies possessed by the company.

In September 2023, Studio Kwangya changed its company name to Studio Realive.

== Subsidiaries ==
- Studio A (2022)
- Studio Clon (2023)
