= Little Things (ABBA song) =

2021 single by ABBA

Single by ABBA

from the album Voyage
- Released: 3 December 2021
- Studio: Riksmixningsverket, Stockholm
- Genre: Pop; Christmas
- Length: 3:08
- Label: Polar; Universal
- Composer: Benny Andersson
- Lyricist: Björn Ulvaeus
- Producers: Benny Andersson; Björn Ulvaeus

ABBA singles chronology
"Just a Notion" (2021)	"Little Things" (2021)	"No Doubt About It" (2022)

Music video
- "Little Things" on YouTube

"Little Things" is a song by ABBA, released on their 2021 album Voyage. It is the third track on the album. It was released as a single on 3 December 2021.

== Background and synopsis ==
The song was written by Benny Andersson and Björn Ulvaeus, who contributed music and lyrics respectively. The song is partly based on "Godnattvisa" ("lullaby" or "cradle song"), an instrumental by Benny Anderssons Orkester, released on the album BAO 3 in 2007.

It was announced in December 2021 that all of the band's royalties earned from the song in the next five years would be donated to UNICEF, the United Nations agency responsible for providing humanitarian and developmental aid to children worldwide. In 1979, the band similarly donated their royalties from the single "Chiquitita" to UNICEF, in recognition of that year's designation as "International Year of the Child".

Described as a "gentle reflection on the joy of Christmas morning and family time around this special time of year", "Little Things" is about a woman who wakes up on Christmas morning and reflects on the joy that the season brings her and her family, and all the 'little things' that make Christmas special. The outro features the Children's Choir of the Stockholm International School.

== Music video ==
A lyric video for the song was published to ABBA's official YouTube channel on 5 November 2021. It was directed by Mike Anderson, and produced by Nick Barratt, of the Able production company.

On 3 December 2021, the official music video for the song was published to the band's YouTube channel. The video features schoolchildren getting together at Christmastime and producing their own ABBA Voyage-inspired concert. The video features an extended version of the song (additional parts before and after the choir), not available on the CD single. The band members themselves do not make a direct appearance in the video, showing only on screen as part of the depicted production effort. The music video was directed by Sophie Muller.

== Personnel ==
=== ABBA ===
- Agnetha Fältskog - Vocals
- Anni-Frid Lyngstad - Vocals
- Benny Andersson - Keyboards
- Björn Ulvaeus - Guitar

=== Other personnel and production staff ===
- Jan Bengtson - flute
- Per Grebacken - flute, clarinet
- Per Lindvall - percussion
- Children's Choir of the Stockholm International School - vocals
- Stockholm Concert Orchestra, conducted by Göran Arnberg - orchestration

== Charts ==
Chart performance for "Little Things"
Chart (2021)	Peak position
Finland Airplay (Radiosoittolista)	56
Germany (GfK)	42
New Zealand Hot Singles (Recorded Music NZ)	37
Sweden (Sverigetopplistan)	20
UK Singles (OCC)	61

== Release history ==
Release history for "Little Things"
Region	Date	Format	Label	Ref.
Italy	10 December 2021	Contemporary hit radio	Universal	
