= Under Attack =

Single by ABBA

from the album The Singles: The First Ten Years
- B-side: "You Owe Me One"
- Released: 3 December 1982
- Recorded: 2–4 August 1982
- Studio: Polar, Stockholm
- Genre: Synth-pop
- Length: 3:45
- Label: Polar
- Songwriters: Benny Andersson; Björn Ulvaeus
- Producers: Benny Andersson; Björn Ulvaeus

ABBA singles chronology
"The Day Before You Came" (1982)	"Under Attack" (1982)	"Thank You For The Music" (1983)

Music video
- "Under Attack" on YouTube

"Under Attack" is a song by the Swedish recording group ABBA. Written and produced by Benny Andersson and Björn Ulvaeus, Agnetha Fältskog provides the lead vocals to the synth-pop number. It was released on 3 December 1982, via Polar Music, as the second and final single from the group's compilation The Singles: The First Ten Years. The track's B-side, "You Owe Me One", was taken from the sessions of the group's aborted ninth album. "Under Attack" is notable as the final original single ABBA released for nearly forty years, as aside from a 1983 reissue of "Thank You for the Music", and 1992 reissues of the latter song, "Dancing Queen", and "Voulez-Vous", they would unofficially disband until 2021, when they reunited for their final studio album Voyage.

Released at the end of the group's run, "Under Attack" became the group's worst charting single since "So Long". While it did crack the top ten in Argentina, Belgium, Finland, and the Netherlands, it charted poorly in the United Kingdom and especially Australia. The song's performance on the Late Late Breakfast Show in December 1982 would be the final live performance ABBA would ever perform. "Under Attack" is featured on More ABBA Gold: More ABBA Hits (1993). The song is featured in the musical theater production Mamma Mia! but not in the film.

== Background ==
ABBA recorded "Under Attack" between 2 and 4 August 1982 at Polar Studios, Stockholm. The group had originally intended to release a new studio album, but instead decided to release a double-album compilation of their past singles while adding two new songs from the session. The two new tracks that made it onto The Singles: The First Ten Years were "The Day Before You Came" and "Under Attack". The latter would eventually be added to the expanded editions of The Visitors album. Ulvaeus spoke pejoratively of the single, saying "the sound on the vocals of "Under Attack" is very much of the 1980s."

On 11 December 1982, ABBA performed "Under Attack" on the BBC's Late Late Breakfast Show, in what was their last collective performance.

== Critical reception ==
Australian magazine The Age called "Under Attack" a "typical catchy ABBA track." British music trade magazine Record Business wrote a mixed review of "Under Attack", saying that while "the familiar harmonies are back, if somewhat muted...the song lacks the killer hook so typical of the group," although they called it "considerably stronger" than "The Day Before You Came". Mark Savage of the BBC retrospectively described the song as "dated and underwhelming." Laura Snapes ranked "Under Attack" last place in The Guardian's ranking of all of ABBA's UK singles, noting how "the dissonance between the robotic verses and a bizarrely jaunty chorus about being at one’s wit’s end over a stalker is too jarring to work."

== Commercial reception ==
"Under Attack" was not a commercial success upon its release. The group's success and popularity were in decline and their two previous singles, "Head over Heels" and "The Day Before You Came", were significantly less successful than their previous hits. In most markets, it was released between January and February 1983.

=== United Kingdom ===
Following the commercial failure of "The Day Before You Came" (the group's first single to miss the top thirty since "I Do, I Do, I Do, I Do, I Do"), "Under Attack" was rush-released in hope of improving chart positions. The track debuted at number 46 on the UK Singles Chart the week of 11 December 1982; it peaked at number 26 two weeks later, staying there for four consecutive weeks. Staying on the chart for eight total weeks, it was a minor improvement over "The Day Before You Came" but was still ABBA's third consecutive single to miss the top ten.

=== Europe ===
Across the rest of Europe, "Under Attack" ranged from a sizable hit to a minor one. In Belgium, the single debuted at number 11 on the Ultratop 50 chart the week of 25 December 1982, and rose up to a peak position of number two on 22 January 1983, the song's highest position on a record chart. The single spent eight weeks in total on the chart, and placed at number 63 on the 1983 year-end charts. In the Netherlands, "Under Attack" debuted at number 43 on the Single Top 100 the week of 11 December 1982, and peaked at number seven on 25 December, the group's worst showing since "Summer Night City" reached number ten in 1978; it did perform slightly better on the Dutch Top 40, hitting number five on 8 January 1983. "Under Attack" also charted in some other countries, peaking at number eight on Finland's Suomen virallinen lista, number 11 on the Irish Singles Chart, number 19 in Spain, and number 22 in West Germany.

=== Australia ===
"Under Attack", however, charted the most poorly in Australia. Released in January 1983 via RCA Victor, the single debuted at number 98 on the Kent Music Report chart the week of 14 February 1983, and a week later peaked at a dismal number 96 before falling off. It was ABBA's lowest peaking single in the country, where their popularity only a few years prior had rivaled that of the Beatles. It was also released in neighboring New Zealand, but it did not chart there.

== Music video ==
ABBA filmed a music video for "Under Attack" on 16 November 1982. The video shows ABBA navigating their way through an empty warehouse filled with red beacon lights. The video ends with the four members walking through the open warehouse door and into the distance, their backs to the camera, reaching the end of ABBA.

== Personnel ==
- Agnetha Fältskog – lead vocals
- Anni-Frid Lyngstad – backing vocals
- Björn Ulvaeus – guitar, vocoder vocals
- Benny Andersson – keyboards, synthesizer

== Track listings and formats ==
Standard 7-inch single

1. "Under Attack" – 3:45
2. "You Owe Me One" – 3:29

Spanish 7-inch single

1. "Under Attack" – 3:45
2. "The Day Before You Came" – 5:5

== Charts ==
=== Weekly charts ===
Weekly chart performance for "Under Attack"
Chart (1982–1983)	Peak position
Argentina (CAPIF)	9
Australia (Kent Music Report)	96
Austria (Hitradio Ö3)	16
Belgium (Ultratop 50 Flanders)	2
Finland (Suomen virallinen lista)	8
France (IFOP)	62
Ireland (IRMA)	11
Netherlands (Dutch Top 40)	5
Netherlands (Single Top 100)	7
Spain (AFYVE)	19
UK Singles (Official Charts)	26
UK Airplay (Record Business)	14
West Germany (GfK)	22

=== Year-end charts ===
Year-end chart performance for "Under Attack"
Chart (1983)	Peak position
Belgium (Ultratop 50 Flanders)	63
