= Sensorium (disambiguation) =

A sensorium is the apparatus of an organism's perception considered as a whole.

Sensorium may also refer to:

== Science and technology ==
- Sensorium Corporation, a social virtual reality company
- Sensorium (insect), a sensory organ on insect antennae; see, for example, Oxycoryninae
- Sensorium Project, related to the IRCF360 proximity and motion sensor

== Arts and entertainment ==
- The Sensorium, a 1984 4D film
- Sensorium, a 2012 novel by Abha Dawesar
- "Sensorium", a song by Epica from The Phantom Agony

== See also ==
- Sensoria Music & Film Festival, an annual event in Sheffield, England
