= ABBA Voyage =

2022–2027 concert residency by ABBA

Coordinates: 51.5328°N 0.0136°W

- Residency by ABBA
- Location: Queen Elizabeth Olympic Park, London, England, UK
- Venue: ABBA Arena
- Associated album: Various
- Start date: 27 May 2022
- End date: 28 June 2027 (to date)
- Website: Official website

ABBA concert chronology
- ABBA: The Tour (1979–1980); ABBA Voyage (2022–2027)

ABBA Voyage is a virtual concert residency by the Swedish pop group ABBA. The concerts feature virtual avatars (dubbed "ABBAtars"), depicting the group as they appeared in 1979 and using the original vocals recorded by the group, accompanied by a 10 piece live instrumental band on stage. The concerts are held in the ABBA Arena, a purpose-built venue in the Queen Elizabeth Olympic Park in London. It is produced by Svana Gisla and Ludvig Andersson, directed by Baillie Walsh, co-executive produced by Johan Renck and choreographed by Wayne McGregor.

The digital versions of ABBA were created with motion capture and performance techniques with the four band members and the visual effects company Industrial Light & Magic, in what is the company's first foray into music.

According to media reports, the project is one of the most expensive live music experiences in history, with a budget of $175 million. The show was nominated for two categories at the 21st Visual Effects Society Awards, losing Outstanding Virtual Cinematography in a CG Project to the film Avatar: The Way of Water (2022), but winning Outstanding Visual Effects in a Special Venue Project.

== Background ==
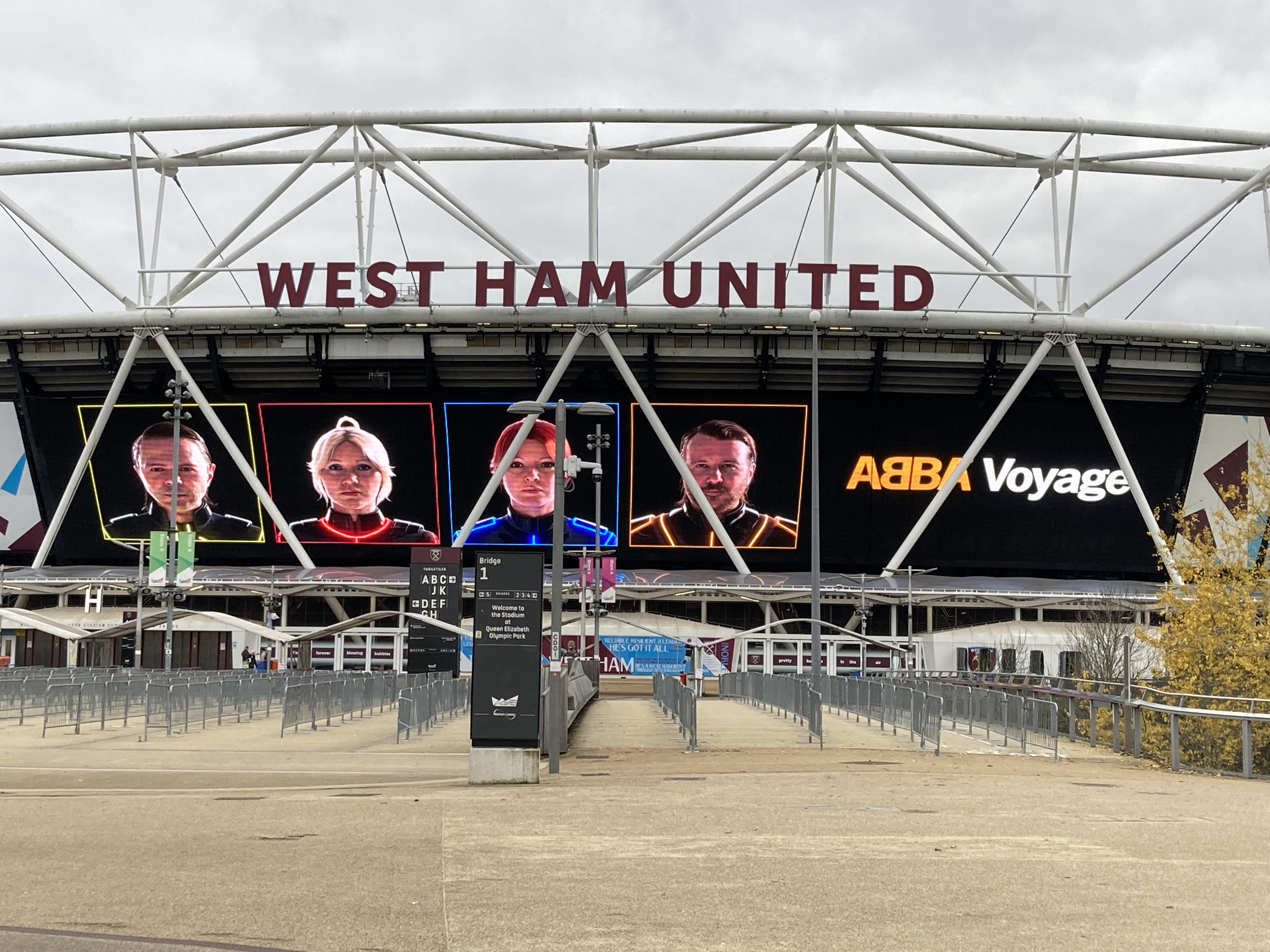
A billboard for the concert at London Stadium, December 15, 2021

ABBA had unofficially split up in December 1982, and despite renewed interest in the band from the 1990s onwards, following the worldwide success of their greatest hits album ABBA Gold, the musical Mamma Mia! and its film adaptation, the members had repeatedly refused to re-form. Reportedly, they turned down an offer of $1 billion in 2000 to perform again. In 2008, Björn Ulvaeus told The Sunday Telegraph, "We will never appear on stage again. There is simply no motivation to re-group." He repeated the statement in an interview in 2014 while promoting the publication of ABBA: The Official Photo Book.

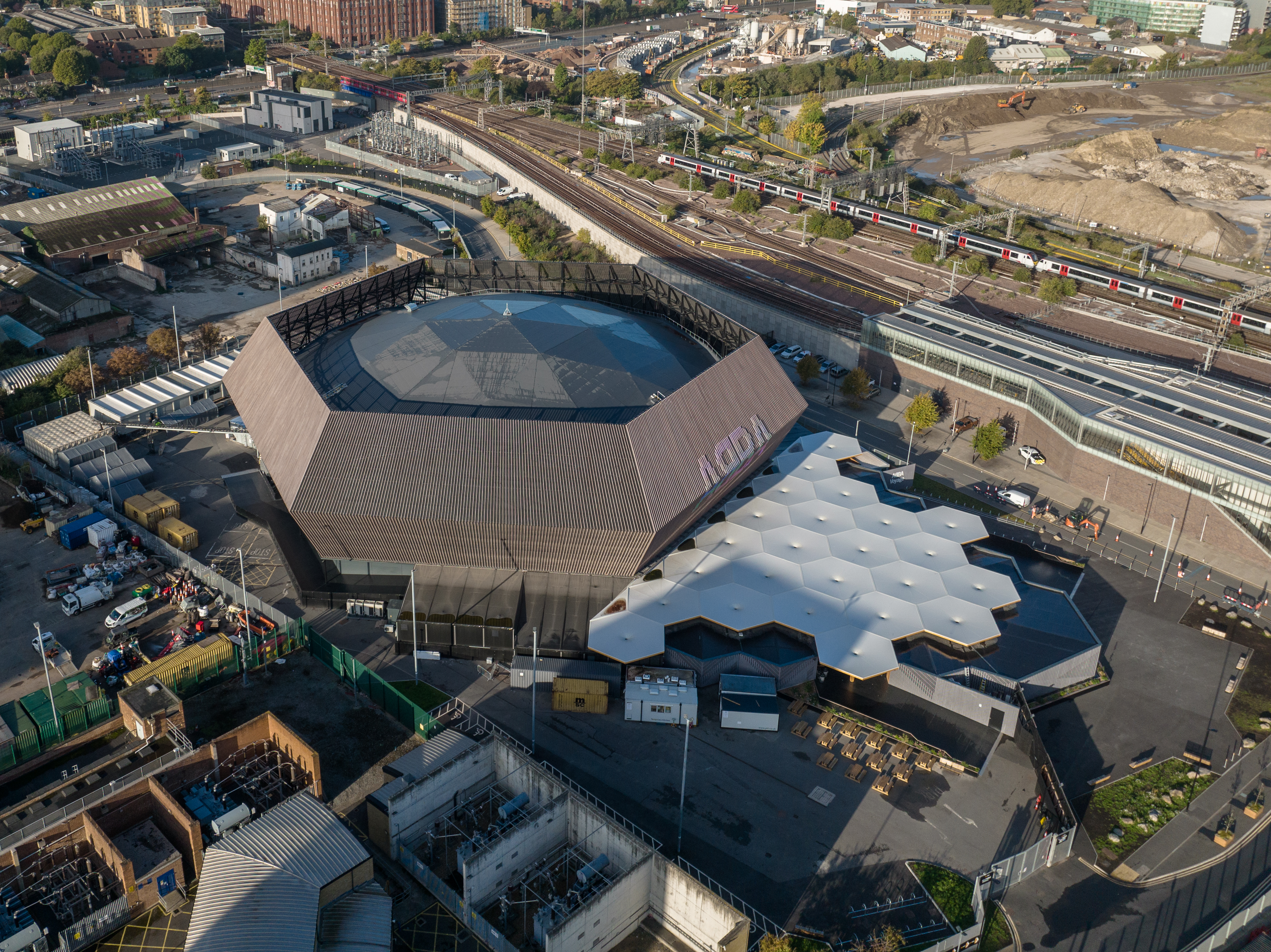
The ABBA Arena in October 2022

In 2016 American media reported that British entrepreneur Simon Fuller had approached ABBA with his idea to create a virtual reality ABBA using new technology. In November that year Fuller was photographed in London meeting with ABBA. In September 2017, Benny Andersson told Swedish newspaper Expressen that there were plans for ABBA to tour "virtually", using digital avatars of the group. In April 2018, the four members issued a statement saying that during preparations for the tour, they had regrouped in the studio and had recorded two new songs, titled "I Still Have Faith in You" and "Don't Shut Me Down".

== Announcement and development ==
On 26 August 2021, the "ABBA Voyage" website was launched, indicating the announcement of a new project a week later. On 2 September 2021, a globally-streamed press conference from the Queen Elizabeth Olympic Park in east London confirmed that the virtual concerts would take place in London from 27 May 2022. In addition, Voyage, a new ABBA album, was announced to be released on 5 November 2021. The new album features ten songs, including the previously-announced "I Still Have Faith in You" and "Don't Shut Me Down". The concerts feature a 10-piece live band playing alongside the group's digital avatars, performing 22 of ABBA's songs. The live band members were selected by James Righton of Klaxons, and its first incarnation featured Little Boots on keyboards. Andersson commented that while building the setlist, the band realised that "we cannot not play [the hits] but we also wanted to give the concert some dynamics, so there are a few songs that the audience will not be too familiar with, but we like them so we put them in. It's 21 songs and it feels good".

Concerts started in May 2022, and, so far, are extended until June 2027. In 2022, The New York Times reported that shows could extend up until April 2026, when the permission for the ABBA Arena was to expire to give space to a housing development on the site.

As of September 4, 2023, ABBA Voyage sold more than 1.5 million tickets and has generated over $150 million in sales, outperforming many major live shows. The venue maintains a near-perfect attendance record, with a 99% full house every night. The show runs seven times a week, earning over $2 million weekly, with an average ticket price of around £85 ($105).

As of April 2026, the concert residency has attracted over four million visitors, reflecting its continued commercial success and sustained global appeal several years after its launch.

== ABBAtar technology ==
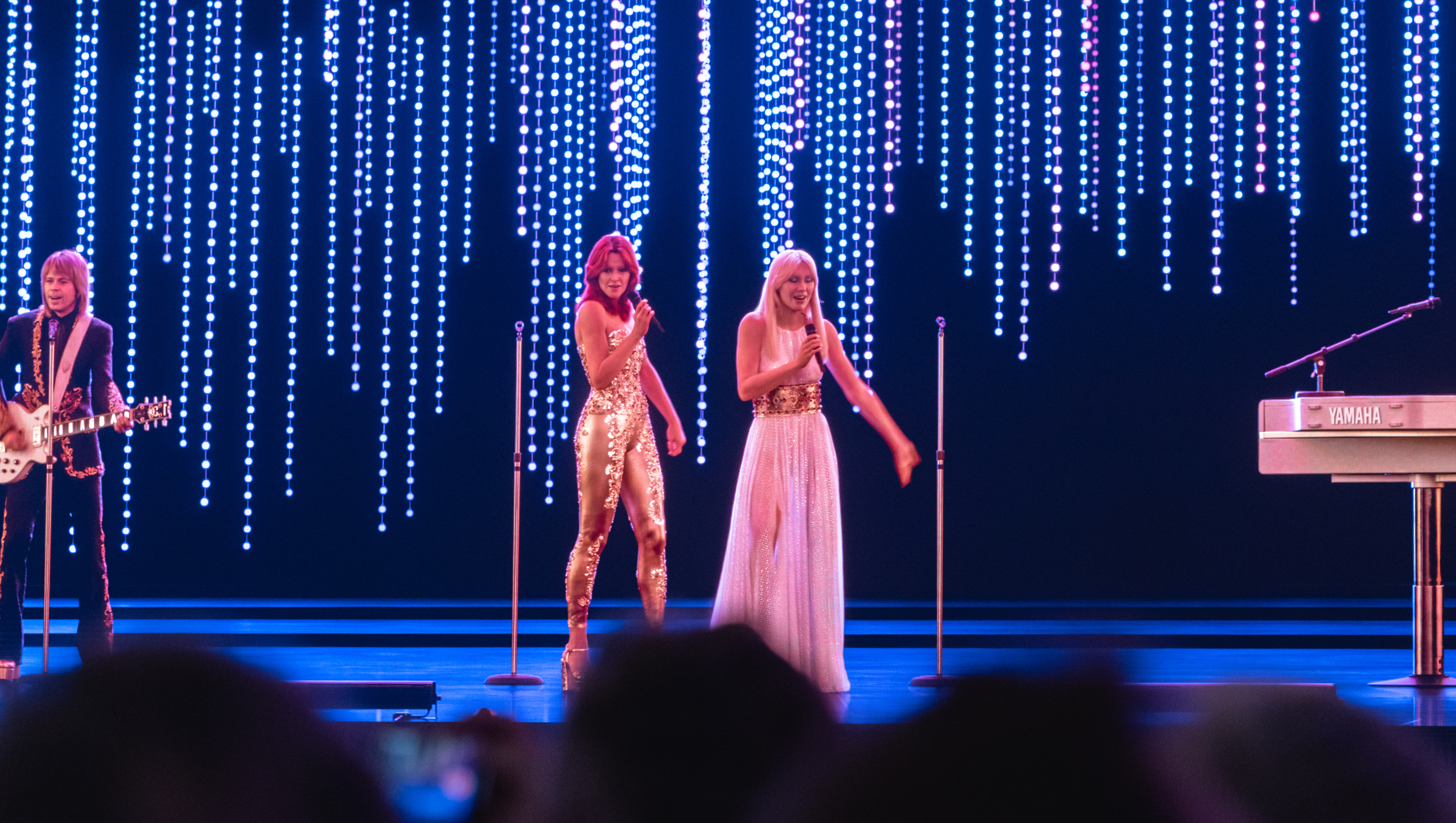
A performance featuring the ABBAtars

The "ABBAtars" are rendered via computer-generated imagery, courtesy of visual effects company Industrial Light & Magic (ILM). All the views of the band are 2D renderings of the same 3D animation at different scales and from different angles. A 9.5-metre-high (31 ft) 65-megapixel LED display shows the life-size on-stage band at a frame rate more than twice that of standard movie projectors, roughly the frame rate used in some screenings of The Hobbit. The center of the screen shows the band where they would be were it an actual screen, with the side screens also being large LED displays, which are often used to show "camera" views. The lighting setups on both the real and virtual sets are matched and synchronized in such a way as to preserve and enhance the illusion of physical presence. Numerous other practical and virtual effects are added to further enhance the illusion of presence. Contrary to early speculation, the setup does not use the famous Pepper's ghost illusion, which involves a translucent reflective screen at an angle to the audience's view direction.

The ABBA band members wore motion-capture suits as part of the development process and were filmed as they performed a 22-song set over the course of five weeks. Some 160 cameras were used. The choreography is based on the band members' real movements, but captured from younger body doubles. The digital band, using the songs' originally-recorded vocals, are accompanied by a live instrumental band on stage. Andersson stated that ILM "can do the work if we wanted to swap a couple of songs in a year's time or so and work on it and it'll be exactly the same. We don't have to go back ourselves into the studio again. That's what they have promised us".

== Reception ==
The opening night of ABBA Voyage was attended by celebrities, including Kylie Minogue, Keira Knightley, Kate Moss, Sharleen Spiteri, and Carola Häggkvist, as well as members of the Swedish royal family, including Carl XVI Gustaf and Queen Silvia. Mark Sutherland of Variety wrote that the crowd gave a standing ovation at the concert. After the 90-minute avatar performance, the four members of ABBA appeared on stage and gave a curtain call.

== Setlist ==
The following set list was obtained from the opening show on 26 May 2022 at the ABBA Arena in London. It does not represent all concerts for the duration of the residency.

Act 1

1. "Skallgång" (Benny Andersson song; introduction)
2. "The Visitors"
3. "Hole in Your Soul"
4. "SOS" (with "EastEnders theme tune" piano introduction)
5. "Knowing Me, Knowing You" (video interlude)

Act 2

6. "Chiquitita"
7. "Fernando"
8. "Mamma Mia"
9. "Does Your Mother Know"
10. "Eagle" ("Rora" video interlude 1)

Act 3

11. "Lay All Your Love on Me" (video interlude)
12. "Summer Night City"
13. "Gimme! Gimme! Gimme! (A Man After Midnight)"
14. "Voulez-Vous" ("Rora" video interlude 2)

Act 4

15. "When All Is Said and Done"
16. "Don't Shut Me Down"
17. "I Still Have Faith in You"
18. "Waterloo" (video interlude)

Act 5

19. "Thank You for the Music"
20. "Dancing Queen"

Encore

21. "The Winner Takes It All"
22. "I Wonder (Departure)" (instrumental outro)

Setlist alterations starting May 2025

- "Super Trouper" or "Take a Chance on Me" are performed after "Fernando".
- "The Name of the Game" is performed instead of "When All is Said and Done".
- "Money, Money, Money" is performed after the "Waterloo" interlude.

== Personnel ==
Initial personnel list adapted from Vogue, NME and Industrial Light & Magic, unless otherwise noted. There was a complete change of band personnel in April 2024, and again in November 2025.

ABBA:

- Agnetha Fältskog
- Björn Ulvaeus
- Benny Andersson
- Anni-Frid Lyngstad

2022 Band:

- Dom John – guitar
- Eoin Rooney – guitar
- Joe Stoddart – bass
- Sarah Burrell – keyboards, synthesizer
- Victoria Hesketh – keyboards, synthesizer
- Victoria Smith – drums
- Tuca Milan – percussion
- Anna Kirby – saxophone
- Rachel Clark – backing vocals
- Amina Gichinga – backing vocals
- Grace Barrett – backing vocals

2024 Band:

- Todd Blackmore – guitar
- Christian Mendoza – guitar
- Robyn Brown – bass
- Amy Hsu – keyboards
- Janette Williams – drums
- Robbie Gibson – percussion
- Hannah Corcoran – saxophone
- Carlene Graham – backing vocals
- Kara-Ami McCreanor – backing vocals
- Cleopatra Rey – backing vocals

2025 Band:

- Christian Mendoza – guitar
- Fernando Sanchez – guitar
- Matt Round – bass
- Emily Brown – keyboard
- Manuel Hollendohner – drums
- Tuca Milan – percussion
- Anna Kirby – saxophone
- Natalia Brown – backing vocals
- Verity Jones – backing vocals
- Anthonia Edwards – backing vocals

Crew:

- Svana Gisla – producer
- Ludvig Andersson – producer
- Baillie Walsh – director
- Johan Renck – co-executive producer
- Wayne McGregor – movement director, choreographer
- Josh Barwick - line producer
- Steve Aplin – motion director
- Ben Morris – visual effects supervisor
- Shynola – "Rora" video interludes
- James Righton – band casting
- Stufish Entertainment Architects – ABBA Arena

Body doubles:

- William Collins – Björn double
- Sonya Cullingford – Frida double
- Max Hessman – Benny double
- Isabel La Cras – Agnetha double
- Liv Austen – Agnetha understudy
- Heather Birley – Frida understudy
- Leo Elso – Benny understudy
- James Pattison – Björn understudy

Wardrobe:

- Bea Åkerlund – head costume designer
- Manish Arora – costume designer
- Roth House – costume designer
- Michael Schmidt – costume designer
- Dolce & Gabbana – costume designers
- Erevos Aether – costume designers
- Carolin Holzhuber – shoes designer
- Terry de Havilland – shoes designer
