= Per Sundin =

Swedish music executive

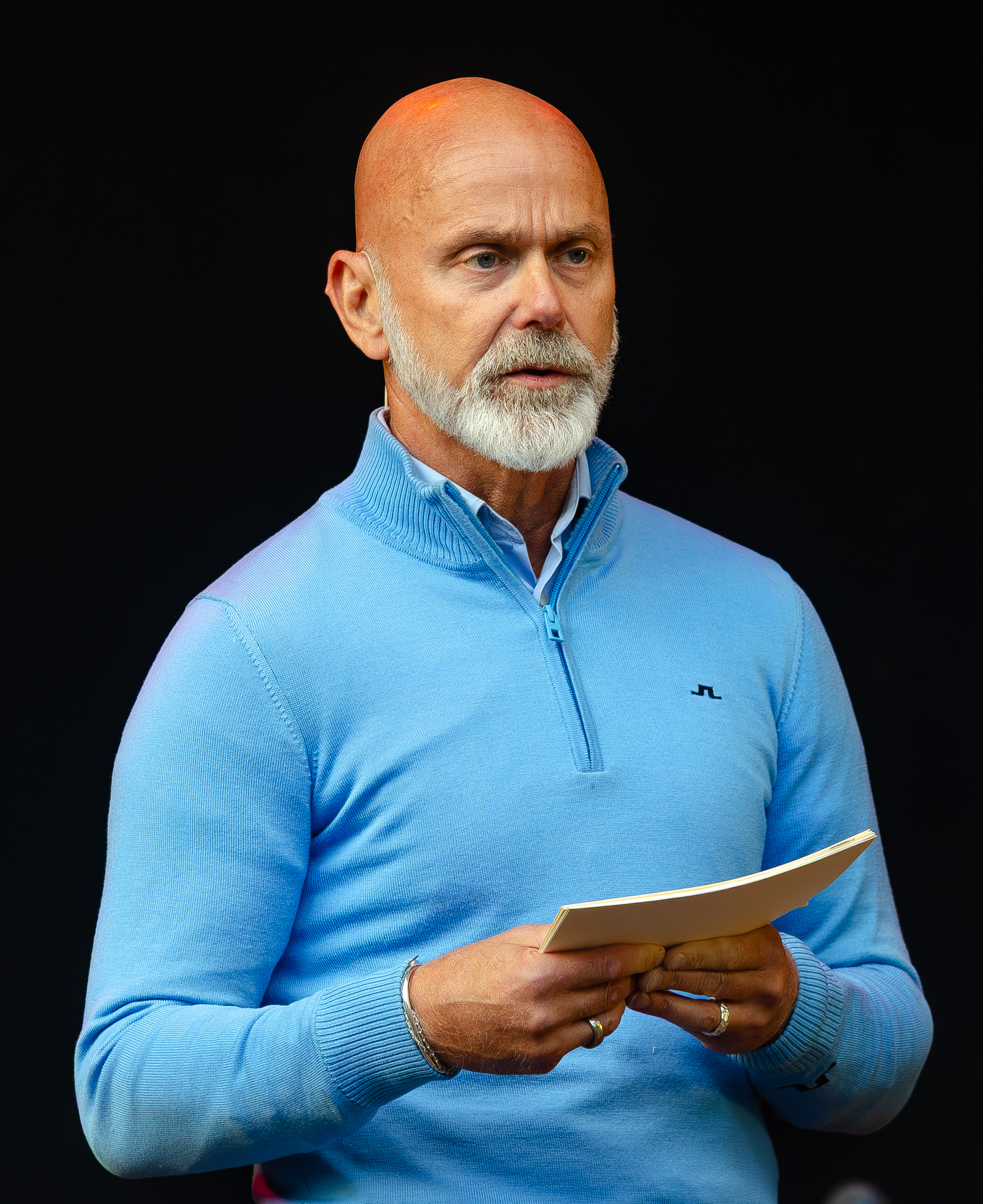
- Sundin in 2022
- Born: Per Urban Sundin; 1963 (age 62–63); Sweden
- Education: Mid Sweden University (B.Sc.)
- Occupation: Music executive
- Years active: 1989–present
- Employer: Pophouse Entertainment
- Known for: Work with Avicii, Tove Lo, Swedish House Mafia, ABBA; co-founder of Avicii Experience
- Title: Chief Executive Officer, Pophouse Entertainment

Per Urban Sundin (born 1963) is a Swedish music executive who has been the chief executive officer (CEO) of Pophouse Entertainment since 2019. Previously, he served as the managing director of Universal Music Sweden and president of Universal Music Nordics from 2008 to 2019.

Sundin is known for his work with musicians such as Avicii, Tove Lo, Swedish House Mafia, and ABBA. He is also the co-founder of Avicii Experience, a museum dedicated to Avicii with whom he worked closely after signing him in 2010.

He has been credited for his role in the rise of Spotify and music streaming, which is depicted in the Netflix TV series The Playlist.

== Early life and education ==
Sundin was born in 1963 in Sweden. He attended Mid Sweden University, where he graduated with a degree in systems science.

== Career ==
Sundin started his career as a marketing manager at CBS Associated Records, now part of Sony Music, in 1989. He was promoted to the marketing director position in 1991. Soon, he left CBS Records and worked with the national radio channel, Radio City, and Swedish commercial TV channel, TV4, as an artist manager.

In 1998, he rejoined Sony Music Sweden as managing director. Three years later, in 2001, he became the managing director of Sony Music in the Nordic region.

Between 2004 and 2008, Sundin served as the CEO of Sony BMG after the merger between Sony and BMG.

In 2008, Sundin joined Universal Music Sweden as the chairman and CEO. At Universal Music, he was a witness in the trial against The Pirate Bay co-founder, Peter Sunde, in Malmö. In the same year, he became the first music label executive to partner with Spotify and thereby opened the door for the streaming platform. His instrumental role in the rise of Spotify is portrayed in the Netflix drama, The Playlist.

In 2010, Sundin signed Avicii to Universal Music, where Avicii in 2011 released his track, "Levels".

In August 2019, Sundin joined Pophouse Entertainment, an entertainment company co-founded by Conni Jonsson and ABBA-member Björn Ulvaeus, as the CEO. Under his tenure, Pophouse Entertainment has among other things acquired the publishing and recording rights of Swedish House Mafia in March 2022, and bought Swedish podcast producer Perfect Day Media.
