= Just a Notion =

2021 single by ABBA

Single by ABBA

from the album Voyage
- Released: 22 October 2021
- Recorded: 1978, 2021
- Genre: Europop; pop rock; rock and roll
- Length: 3:31
- Label: Polar
- Songwriters: Benny Andersson; Björn Ulvaeus
- Producers: Benny Andersson; Björn Ulvaeus

ABBA singles chronology
"I Still Have Faith in You" / "Don't Shut Me Down" (2021)	"Just a Notion" (2021)	"Little Things" (2021)

Lyric video
- "Just a Notion" on YouTube

"Just a Notion" is a song by ABBA. It was released on 22 October 2021 as the second single from the quartet's 2021 album Voyage, following the dual lead single "I Still Have Faith in You" and "Don't Shut Me Down", released in September 2021. Originally written and produced for the group's 1979 album Voulez-Vous, the song was released over forty-three years later. The recording retains its vocals from 1978 but includes re-recorded instrumentation added much later, during the reunion.

== Background and recording ==
"Just a Notion" was initially recorded in September 1978 during sessions for the album Voulez-Vous. Although progressing beyond the demo stage, Benny Andersson and Bjorn Ulvaeus became unsatisfied with it, deeming it "unmixable" and leaving it unreleased. However, a snippet of a rough mix by ABBA's engineer Michael B. Tretow was ultimately released on the box set Thank You for the Music in 1994. Carl Magnus Palm has also confirmed that the verse included in the "ABBA Undeleted" medley is the second verse of the song.

After ABBA reunited, and despite Andersson and Ulvaeus' prior criticism, "Just a Notion" was revisited for the reunion album Voyage. Benny Andersson recorded a new backing track with drums and guitars for the Voyage version, but it retains the vocals from the original 1978 version. "Just a Notion" was released as a single on 22 October 2021, before the November 5th release of Voyage.

Prior to the full release of ABBA’s partial re-recording, a complete version was recorded by cover band Arrival, which occasionally featured original ABBA bass player Rutger Gunnarsson as a special guest, and was included on their 1999 album First Flight. While the full version of the song had not yet been released, it still featured the same lyrics as ABBA's original, even though much of the song remained unheard and unreleased at that point.

== Lyric video ==
ABBA released a lyric video on YouTube for "Just a Notion" to accompany its release. The video is directed by Mike Anderson and produced by Nick Barratt of the production company Able. The video received 583,000 views in its first 24 hours on YouTube. A brief teaser video on TikTok earned over a million views in its first few days.

== Critical reception ==
Emily Zemler of Rolling Stone calls "Just a Notion" "buoyant" and a "hopeful, upbeat song." Devon Ivie of Vulture writes that the song is "a ridiculously happy romp that finds Agnetha, Björn, Benny, and Anni-Frid harmonizing about the joys of flirting while a power piano noodles in the background."

== Charts ==
Chart performance for "Just a Notion"
Chart (2021)	Peak position
Finland Airplay (Radiosoittolista)	99
Germany (GfK)	36
Japan Hot Overseas (Billboard Japan)	11
Netherlands (Single Top 100)	73
New Zealand Hot Singles (RMNZ)	27
Sweden (Sverigetopplistan)	22
Switzerland (Schweizer Hitparade)	60
UK Singles (OCC)	59

== Release history ==
Release history for "Just A Notion"
Region	Date	Format	Label	Ref.
Various	22 October 2021	Digital download; streaming; CD single	Polar	
Italy	12 November 2021	Contemporary hit radio	Universal	
