= Voyage (ABBA album) =

Studio album by ABBA
- Released: 5 November 2021
- Recorded: 1978, (Note: Parts of the album's second single, “Just a Notion” were initially recorded and produced for Voulez-Vous.) 2017–2021
- Studios: Riksmixningsverket, Stockholm
- Genres: Disco; pop; synth-pop
- Length: 36:58
- Labels: Polar; Universal
- Producer: Benny Andersson

ABBA chronology
Live at Wembley Arena (2014)	Voyage (2021)	The Singles: The First Fifty Years (2024)

Singles from Voyage
- 1. "I Still Have Faith in You" / "Don't Shut Me Down" Released: 2 September 2021; 2. "Just a Notion" Released: 22 October 2021; 3. "Little Things" Released: 3 December 2021; 4. "No Doubt About It" Released: 11 February 2022

Voyage is the ninth and final studio album by the Swedish pop group ABBA, released on 5 November 2021. With ten songs written by Benny Andersson and Björn Ulvaeus, it is the group's first album of new material in forty years, following The Visitors (1981). The album was supported by the dual single release of "I Still Have Faith in You" and "Don't Shut Me Down", released alongside the album announcement on 2 September 2021. "Just a Notion" was issued as the third single on 22 October 2021, followed by the fourth single "Little Things" on 3 December. A digital concert residency in support of the album, ABBA Voyage, opened in London on 27 May 2022.

Voyage debuted atop the charts of Australia, Austria, Belgium, the Czech Republic, Denmark, Finland, France, Germany, Iceland, Ireland, the Netherlands, New Zealand, Norway, Sweden, Switzerland and England. It also became the group's highest-charting studio album ever in Canada and the United States (as well as their first top ten album in the latter country), debuting at number two on the charts in both countries. The album was nominated for Album of the Year and Best Pop Vocal Album at the 2023 Grammy Awards, in addition to nominations for "I Still Have Faith in You" and "Don't Shut Me Down", the former for Record of the Year at the 2022 Grammy Awards (the first Grammy nomination for the group), and the latter for Record of the Year and Best Pop Duo/Group Performance at the 2023 Grammy Awards. The album has sold over 2.5 million copies worldwide.

== Background ==
ABBA informally split up in 1982 following the release of their retrospective greatest hits album The Singles: The First Ten Years in late 1982. Renewed interest in the band grew from the early 1990s following the worldwide success of their greatest hits album ABBA Gold and the use of their songs in the soundtracks to two Australian cult films, The Adventures of Priscilla, Queen of the Desert and Muriel's Wedding. Interest peaked with the ABBA-based musical Mamma Mia! and the subsequent film of the same name, followed by its 2018 sequel, Mamma Mia! Here We Go Again.

However, the members steadfastly refused to reunite. In 2000, they reportedly turned down an offer of $1 billion to perform again. In July 2008, Björn Ulvaeus categorically stated to The Sunday Telegraph, "We will never appear on stage again. There is simply no motivation to re-group." Ulvaeus reiterated this in a 2014 interview while promoting the publication of ABBA: The Official Photo Book.

On 6 June 2016, however, ABBA did informally reunite at a private party in Stockholm. This led to a more formal reunion. Two years later, in April 2018, they announced they had recorded two new songs, "I Still Have Faith in You" and "Don't Shut Me Down". The new songs initially were intended to support ABBA: Thank You for the Music, An All-Star Tribute, a TV special produced by NBC and the BBC, and a tour, which the special itself supported. In October, British manager Simon Fuller announced in a statement that the group would be reuniting to work on a new "digital entertainment experience". The project would feature the members in their "life-like" avatar form, called ABBAtars, based on their late 1970s tour and would be set to launch by the spring of 2019.

According to Andersson, the idea to record the songs was to show new music during the concerts, which the rest of the band agreed to, "so we did that and I thought with the first two songs, it went so well and they could still sing and we could still produce music in the studio so we said maybe we’ll do a couple of others while we’re at it, and we ended up doing a whole album". However, in October 2018, the TV special was cancelled in favour of the "ABBAtar" project announced months prior.

One of the album's tracks, "Just a Notion", was previously partially included in a demo version as part of the medley "ABBA Undeleted" from the 1994 Thank You for the Music box set. The reworked song was released as a single two weeks before the album, on 22 October 2021. Whilst the vocals date from 1978, its instrumentation was mostly re-recorded. 12 songs were worked for Voyage, but only ten were finished and released on the final tracklist, with Anderson stating they decided to "work on the ones we think we should keep on the album". There are no plans to release the unfinished songs.

While all previous ABBA albums were produced and arranged by Andersson and Ulvaeus as a duo, and featured Ulvaeus as a guitarist, Voyage is the first ABBA album to be solely produced and arranged by Andersson, and to feature no instrumentation from Ulvaeus, though the latter participates as a backing vocalist, songwriter and associate producer. It is also the first ABBA album to not feature longtime drummer Ola Brunkert and bassist Rutger Gunnarsson following their deaths in 2008 and 2015, and the final appearance of longtime lead guitarist Lasse Wellander before his death in 2023. The album was recorded at RMV Studios, on the island of Skeppsholmen in Stockholm, the studio co-owned by Andersson and his son Ludvig, which opened in 2011. This is one of only two ABBA albums where Björn does not sing lead vocal on at least one song.

In May 2022, after the premiere of the ABBA Voyage concert residency in London, Andersson stated in an interview with Variety that "nothing is going to happen after this", confirming the album and residency as ABBA's final group collaborations.

== Promotion and announcement ==
Promotion for Voyage began with the website abbavoyage.com, going live on 26 August 2021. Billboards were erected in London, and social media accounts titled "ABBA Voyage" were also set up. The band announced during a 2 September 2021 YouTube live stream that Voyage would be released on 5 November 2021. The two songs first announced in 2018, "I Still Have Faith in You" and "Don't Shut Me Down", were confirmed as the lead singles from Voyage during the September 2021 live stream.

=== Concert residency ===
During the album announcement live stream, ABBA also announced a concert residency, known as ABBA Voyage, with concerts starting from 27 May 2022 in a custom-built venue at Queen Elizabeth Olympic Park in London.

ABBA first announced they were preparing digital avatars in September 2017. Dubbed the "ABBAtars", they appear during the ABBA Voyage concerts in place of the four actual band members. To animate them, the ABBA band members wore motion-capture suits and were filmed using 160 cameras, with graphics later added by visual effects company Industrial Light & Magic.

The ABBAtar tour was originally set for 2019, but was delayed due to technical issues. The COVID-19 pandemic then forced the band to push the tour back to 2022, turning it then into a seven-month residency in London, with the possibility to extend the shows up until April 2026. As of September 2026, the show continues in London, and no further tour locations have been announced.

== Critical reception ==
Professional ratings
Aggregate scores
Source	Rating
AnyDecentMusic?	7.1/10
Metacritic	72/100
Review scores
Source	Rating
AllMusic	3.5/5 stars
The Guardian	2/5 stars 3/5 stars
The Independent	5/5 stars
The Line of Best Fit	6/10
Mojo	3/5 stars
NME	3/5 stars
Pitchfork	7.4/10
Rolling Stone	4/5 stars
The Telegraph	3/5 stars
The Times	4/5 stars

Voyage received generally positive reviews from music critics. At Metacritic, which assigns a normalized rating out of 100 to reviews from mainstream critics, the album received an average score of 72, based on 16 reviews, which indicates "generally favorable reviews". Aggregator AnyDecentMusic? gave it 7.1 out of 10, based on their assessment of the critical consensus.

Stephen Thomas Erlewine from AllMusic website gave the album three and a half stars out of five and noted that "Andersson and Ulvaeus wisely decided not to follow any stylistic trend or adopt any modern production technique" which made the songs "recognizably ABBA music". He also wrote that like all ABBA's albums "[it] brings the lows along with the highs" and called the album "unexpected and delightful".

Helen Brown from The Independent gave it a full rating of five out of five stars and noted that, as with songs from the 1970s albums, ABBA didn't try to follow the trend or "to update the gloriously gaudy vintage tinsel of their Eighties office party sound" and she stated that a lot of that comes from the fact that the song's creators, Bjorn and Benny, realized from the beginning, "it was their lack of freshness that struck a chord with everyone's inner outsider" and enabled them to have a long career.

In his review for The Telegraph, Neil McCormick wrote that "ABBA’s reputation was established as a consummate singles outfit rather than an album band", and none of the songs featured are as good as their hit singles. He concluded by stating that the result as a whole "is out-of-time rather than timeless".

Ed Potton from The Times magazine rated it with four stars out of five and stated that "Voyage is a reassuringly familiar blend of clear-eyed sentiment, outrageous musicality and utter indifference to fashion". He praised Frida (about whom he claimed to have noticed a stronger Swedish accent than usual, although he doesn't consider this a bad thing) and Agnetha's vocals, calling them "pristine and moving", and wrote that even though the "songs can sound naff on first listen yet you’re pulled in by Benny Andersson’s melodic oomph and Bjorn Ulvaeus’ eccentric lyrical insights".

Rob Sheffield from Rolling Stone gave the album four out of five stars and wrote that it's a surprise that the group has returned with new material and that "it’s a bigger, sweeter surprise that they returned so full of musical vitality. All these years after 'Waterloo', ABBA still refuse to surrender".

In contrast, The Guardian rated the album with two out of five and titled its 5 November 2021 article: "Abba: Voyage review – no thank you for the music".

== Commercial performance ==
Voyage sold more than one million units worldwide in its first week of release. The album recorded 40,000 UK pre-orders in the first 24 hours following the announcement of its release. Three days after the album was announced, it had received over 80,000 pre-orders in the UK alone. This broke the record for the biggest pre-ordered album for Universal Music UK, previously held by Progress (2010) by Take That. By October 2021, the album had recorded 111,000 pre-orders. Advance orders in the Netherlands totalled 40,000 copies.

The album entered the UK Albums Chart at number one, with 204,000 chart sales, 90% (180,000) of which were physical sales. It was the biggest opening week for an album in the UK since Ed Sheeran's ÷ (2017), and became the fastest-selling album of 2021 as well as the fastest-selling vinyl LP of the 21st century, with 29,900 vinyl copies sold. It is ABBA's first number-one album since ABBA Gold, which topped the chart in 1992, 1999 and 2008. It became the 3rd biggest album of 2021 in the UK with 400,000 units and the 2nd best-selling album with 387,000 pure sales.

In Germany, the album also entered at number one on the albums chart with over 200,000 chart sales. In its first week, it sold more copies than the rest of the albums chart combined and also reached the top of the year-end albums chart for the time being. In Italy the album debuted at number six on the albums chart.

Voyage became ABBA's highest-charting album in the United States, entering the Billboard 200 at number two on 20 November 2021, beating their previous high of number 14 with ABBA: The Album in 1978. It opened with 82,000 album-equivalent units, including 78,000 album sales (60,500 of which were physical), making it the highest-selling album of the week.

According to IFPI, Voyage was the eighth best-selling album worldwide (all formats) and the second in album sales list. The album sold 2,050,000 copies in 2021, and over 2.5 million by November 2022.

== Track listing ==
All tracks are written by Benny Andersson and Björn Ulvaeus.

Voyage track listing
No.	Title	Length
1.	"I Still Have Faith in You"	5:08
2.	"When You Danced with Me"	2:49
3.	"Little Things"	3:08
4.	"Don't Shut Me Down"	3:59
5.	"Just a Notion"	3:29
6.	"I Can Be That Woman"	4:04
7.	"Keep an Eye on Dan"	4:01
8.	"Bumblebee"	3:57
9.	"No Doubt About It"	2:52
10.	"Ode to Freedom"	3:31
Total length:		36:58

== Personnel ==
Adapted from the album's liner notes.

ABBA

- Anni-Frid Lyngstad – lead vocals (1, 8, 9), co-lead vocals (2, 3, 5, 10), backing vocals
- Agnetha Fältskog – lead vocals (4, 6, 7), co-lead vocals (2, 3, 5, 10), backing vocals
- Benny Andersson – backing vocals, piano, synthesizers

Additional musicians

- Per Lindvall – drums, percussion
- Lasse Wellander – guitars
- Lasse Jonsson – guitars
- Mats Englund – bass guitar (6)
- Pär Grebacken – recorder, clarinet, tenor saxophone
- Jan Bengtson – flute, baritone saxophone
- Margareta Bengtson – harp
- The Children's Choir of Stockholm International School (SIS) – vocals (3)
- Kimberley Akester – SIS choir director (3)
- Stockholm Concert Orchestra – orchestra (10)
- Göran Arnberg – orchestrator/conductor (10)

Production

- Benny Andersson – producer, arranger, mixing (at Mono Music Studios, Stockholm)
- Björn Ulvaeus – associate producer
- Bernard Löhr – engineer, Pro Tools programming, mixing (at Mono Music Studios, Stockholm)
- Linn Fijal; Vilma Colling – assistant engineers
- Björn Engelmann – mastering (at Cutting Room)
- Anneli Thompson – SIS choir musical assistant (3)
- Görel Hanser – coordinator
- Baillie Walsh – design

== Charts ==
=== Weekly charts ===
Chart performance for Voyage
Chart (2021)	Peak position
Australian Albums (ARIA)	1
Austrian Albums (Ö3 Austria)	1
Belgian Albums (Ultratop Flanders)	1
Belgian Albums (Ultratop Wallonia)	1
Canadian Albums (Billboard)	2
Croatian International Albums (HDU)	2
Czech Albums (ČNS IFPI)	1
Danish Albums (Hitlisten)	1
Dutch Albums (Album Top 100)	1
Finnish Albums (Suomen virallinen lista)	1
French Albums (SNEP)	1
German Albums (Offizielle Top 100)	1
Greek Albums (IFPI)	1
Hungarian Albums (MAHASZ)	3
Icelandic Albums (Tonlist)	1
Irish Albums (Official Charts)	1
Italian Albums (FIMI)	6
Japanese Albums (Oricon)	4
Japanese Albums (Oricon) Voyage with ABBA Gold	16
Japanese Hot Albums (Billboard Japan)	4
Lithuanian Albums (AGATA)	23
New Zealand Albums (RMNZ)	1
Norwegian Albums (VG-lista)	1
Polish Albums (ZPAV)	2
Portuguese Albums (AFP)	1
Scottish Albums (Official Charts)	1
Slovak Albums (ČNS IFPI)	2
Spanish Albums (Promusicae)	2
Swedish Albums (Sverigetopplistan)	1
Swiss Albums (Schweizer Hitparade)	1
UK Albums (Official Charts)	1
US Billboard 200	2

=== Year-end charts ===
2021 year-end chart performance for Voyage
Chart (2021)	Position
Australian Albums (ARIA)	10
Austrian Albums (Ö3 Austria)	1
Belgian Albums (Ultratop Flanders)	1
Belgian Albums (Ultratop Wallonia)	3
Czech Albums (ČNS IFPI)	3
Danish Albums (Hitlisten)	12
Dutch Albums (Album Top 100)	4
French Albums (SNEP)	31
German Albums (Offizielle Top 100)	1
Hungarian Albums (MAHASZ)	26
Icelandic Albums (Tónlistinn)	94
Irish Albums (IRMA)	9
Polish Albums (ZPAV)	43
Spanish Albums (PROMUSICAE)	68
Swedish Albums (Sverigetopplistan)	1
Swiss Albums (Schweizer Hitparade)	1
UK Albums (OCC)	3

2022 year-end chart performance for Voyage
Chart (2022)	Position
Austrian Albums (Ö3 Austria)	61
Belgian Albums (Ultratop Flanders)	23
Belgian Albums (Ultratop Wallonia)	77
German Albums (Offizielle Top 100)	3
Hungarian Albums (MAHASZ)	96
Portuguese Albums (AFP)	74
Swedish Albums (Sverigetopplistan)	57
Swiss Albums (Schweizer Hitparade)	13

== Certifications and sales ==
Certifications and sales for Voyage
Region	Certification	Certified units/sales
Australia (ARIA)	Gold	35,000^{‡}
Austria (IFPI Austria)	2× Platinum	30,000^{‡}
Belgium (BRMA)	Platinum	20,000^{‡}
Denmark (IFPI Danmark)	Platinum	20,000^{‡}
France (SNEP)	Platinum	100,000^{‡}
Germany (BVMI)	2× Platinum	400,000
Japan	—	25,839
Netherlands (NVPI)	Platinum	40,000
Poland (ZPAV)	Gold	10,000^{‡}
Sweden (GLF)	2× Platinum	60,000^{‡}
United Kingdom (BPI)	Platinum	502,443
United States	—	218,000
Summaries
Worldwide	—	2,500,000
^{‡} Sales+streaming figures based on certification alone.

== Release history ==
Release dates and formats for Voyage
Region	Date	Format(s)	Edition(s)	Label	Ref.
Various	5 November 2021	CD; Cassette; LP; Digital download; Streaming	Standard	Polar; Universal	
Japan	5 November 2021	2×CD	Standard + ABBA Gold	Universal	
Japan	5 November 2021	CD + DVD	Standard + The Essential Collection	Universal	
Japan	5 November 2021	CD + 2 DVDs	Standard + ABBA in Japan	Universal	
