= Terry de Havilland =

English shoe designer (1938-2019)

- Born: Terrence Higgins; 21 March 1938; Barking, England
- Died: 27 November 2019 (aged 81); Hastings, England
- Occupation: Shoe designer
- Label: Terry de Havilland
- Spouse: Liz de Havilland

Terrence Higgins (21 March 1938 – 27 November 2019), professionally known as Terry de Havilland, was an English shoe designer. Known as the 'Rock n Roll Cobbler of the 1970s', he is most famed for his key part in the ‘Swinging London’ fashion scene, with clients including Marianne Faithfull, Led Zeppelin, Bianca Jagger and David Bowie. His platforms are still worn today by British model Kate Moss.

== Early life ==
Terry de Havilland was born in London into a family of cobblers and was young when his parents started their own company, Waverley Shoes. He was already assisting in the workshop at the age of five. Their company catered to West End clientele and showgirls from the city’s busy theatres, producing winklepickers.

== Career ==
In the 1960s he found a pair of three-tiered wedges in his father’s attic. He made up new pairs in psychedelic snakeskin colours. The Jolly Boy stall sold the shoes, and as quickly as they were picked up from the factory they were sold.

After the collapse of ‘Kamikaze’ in 1988, the Terry de Havilland name went on to take the guise of ‘Magic Shoes’, featuring platform styles and latex boots that proved popular with the clubbers of the 1990s. De Havilland met his future wife Liz in 1990, a textile designer, who helped to build up the brand, which by the mid 90s was stocked by major UK retailers.

The de Havillands then opened ‘Cobblers to the World’ in Camden Stables Market. By this time the company was producing shoes for international fashion publications and blockbuster film productions, but Terry de Havilland suffered a minor heart attack on Christmas Eve in 2001, and the shop was closed the following February to ensure he could focus on editorial work and rebuild the de Havilland brand.

Terry de Havilland opened a pop-up flagship store in London in 2013.

de Havilland died aged 81 on 27 November 2019.

== Awards ==
In 2006, Terry de Havilland was nominated as Accessory Designer of the Year at the British Fashion Awards and in 2010 was awarded a Drapers Lifetime Achievement Award for his contribution to footwear design over the last fifty years.
