= Sensorium Corporation =

Social virtual reality company

- Company type: Private
- Industry: Virtual reality, Social media
- Headquarters: Cayman Islands
- Number of locations: Los Angeles, Zurich, London, Moscow

Sensorium Corporation is a social virtual reality (VR) company that is registered in the Cayman Islands with multiple offices nationwide. Including Los Angeles, California, Zurich, Switzerland, London, United Kingdom and Moscow, Russia.

== Overview ==
The initial prototype of Sensorium Galaxy platform was introduced at the Electronics Entertainment Expo (E3) in June 2019.

== History ==
Sensorium Corporation was founded in 2018 by billionaire Mikhail Prokhorov, former owner of the Brooklyn Nets. The company developed Sensorium Galaxy, a social virtual reality platform that incorporates social communication tools, graphics, avatars powered by artificial intelligence, and content produced by partner artists and media companies.

Epic Games is a Sensorium partner.

Sensorium Corporation has raised over $100 million in private investments since its foundation. The platform is scheduled for public launch in the first half of 2021.

In April 2020 Yann Pissenem, co-founder of Ushuaïa Ibiza and Hï Ibiza nightclubs, entered into a partnership with Sensorium Corporation to develop artist collaborations for PRISM, a thematic world in Sensorium Galaxy dedicated to electronic music events. Sensorium also signed an agreement with London-based creative studio High Scream to develop the visual concept.

In September 2020, Sensorium Corporation announced DJ David Guetta joined Sensorium Galaxy to host his performances.

In October 2020 British house and techno record producer and DJ Carl Cox confirmed a collaboration with Sensorium Galaxy to create a series of VR-based DJ sets.

Dutch DJ and producer Armin van Buuren announced a series of performances in Sensorium Galaxy.

On October 27, 2023, 'Intermundium', the virtual show created in collaboration with Carl Cox, was released.
