= Stockholm International School =

Coordinates: 59.33907°N 18.06604°E

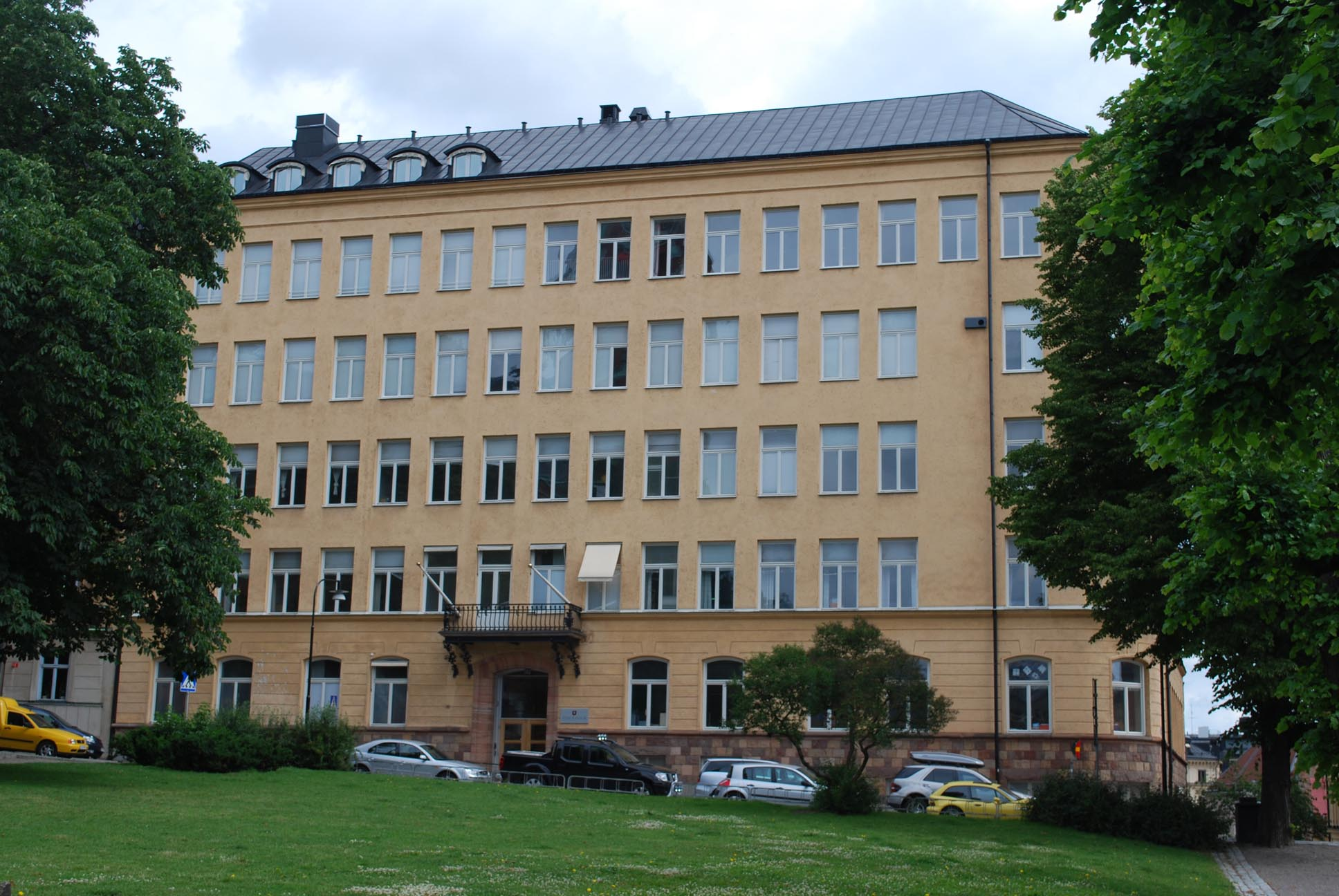
- Johannesgatan 18, SE-111 38 and Norra Latin, Drottninggatan 71B SE-111 36 Stockholm; Sweden

Information
- Type: International
- Motto: Valued, Challenged, Balanced, Prepared
- Established: 1951
- President: Mr Hans Skeppner
- Head of school: David Osler (interim director)
- Staff: 195 (October 2025 figure)
- Grades: Pre-K to 12
- Enrollment: c800 Students (October 2025 figure)
- Colors: SIS red and grey
- Mascot: Oggi the Owl
- Accreditation: IB, CIS, MSA A Google for Education Reference School
- Website: https://stockholmis.se/

Stockholm International School (SIS), formerly known as the Anglo-American School of Stockholm, is an international school located in Stockholm founded in 1951. The school teaches International Baccalaureate IB Programmes for primary, middle, and upper school students. SIS has two sites: the Primary School is housed on Johannesgatan next to St. Johannes Church in the centre of Stockholm. The Middle and Upper Schools of SIS are housed in Norra Latin on Drottninggatan.

As of 2026, the head of the school María (Marisa) Isabel León died. David Osler has been appointed as interim director.

== History ==
Gisela Dietze founded the English School, which initially, in 1951 occupied a campus on Djurgården. The school had 58 students from 15 countries by the end of that year. The school was renamed to Anglo-American School of Stockholm in 1964 and then to International School of Stockholm in 1978. The student body numbered 288 by 1967, when SIS moved to its current location on Johannesgatan. The International School of Stockholm sought to have the International Baccalaureate Programme implemented at the school in 2000 and the first IB students started at the school in 2001. In 2004, the school changed its name to Stockholm International School.
