= AMAZE (company) =

Virtual reality concert production company

- Formerly: AmazeVR
- Industry: XR, Virtual Reality, Entertainment, Music
- Founded: July 2015
- Founders: JB Lee, Steve Lee, Jeremy Nam and Steven Koo
- Headquarters: Los Angeles, California, U.S.
- Products: VR Concert apps, Theatrical VR Concerts
- Website: www.amazevr.com www.amazevrconcerts.com

AMAZE (formerly AmazeVR) is a virtual reality concert production company founded in July 2015 by former executives and founders of Kakao. Its headquarters is located in Los Angeles, California, with a second office in Seoul, South Korea. AMAZE develops VR concert experiences for global pop and K-pop artists, distributed via VR headset apps and theatrical installations.

== History ==
Founded in Silicon Valley in 2015, AMAZE secured $7 million in Series A funding between December 2018 and April 2019 from investors including LG Technology Ventures, CJ Timewise Investment, and Smilegate Investment. This was followed by $2.5 million in Series A2 funding in December 2019 and $9.5 million in bridge funding in April 2021.

In June 2021, AMAZE partnered with Megan Thee Stallion as its first featured artist, resulting in the U.S. theatrical debut of her VR concert, Enter the Hottieverse, in March 2022. A stand-alone app version for the Meta Quest was released in November 2022.

In July 2022, AMAZE formed a joint venture, Studio A, with SM Entertainment, expanding into K-pop VR concert production. In September 2022, the company raised $17 million in Series B funding from investors including GS and Mirae Asset.

In July 2023, AMAZE launched the AmazeVR Concerts App on Meta Quest, followed by its release as a Day 1 app on Apple Vision Pro in February 2024.

From July 2024 to June 2025, AMAZE presented the HYPERFOCUS: TOMORROW X TOGETHER VR CONCERT with Tomorrow X Together globally in territories including South Korea, the United States, Japan, Indonesia, Saudi Arabia, Taiwan, Singapore, China, the United Kingdom, France, Germany, Poland, and Mexico.

== Products and services ==
=== AMAZE Concerts App ===
The AMAZE Concerts app offers cinematic VR concert experiences for Meta Quest and Apple Vision Pro.

=== Theatrical VR concerts ===
The company also produces in-theater VR concerts, offering shared immersive experiences combining 3D visuals and audio.

== Major releases ==
2022

- Megan Thee Stallion, Enter the Hottieverse — U.S. Theater Tour (Mar–Sept); Meta Quest app (Nov)

2023

- Zara Larsson — Meta Quest (Jul)
- UPSAHL — Meta Quest (Jul)
- T-Pain — Meta Quest (Nov)
- aespa — Theatrical release, Seoul (Oct)

2024

- Zara Larsson, UPSAHL, T-Pain — Apple Vision Pro (Feb)
- Avenged Sevenfold — Meta Quest & Apple Vision Pro (Feb)
- aespa — Theatrical release in Tokyo & Osaka (Feb–Apr)
- KAI — Theatrical release in Seoul, Tokyo & Osaka (Feb–May)
- HYPERFOCUS: Tomorrow X Together VR CONCERT — Global Theater Tour (Jul 2024–Jun 2025)

2025

- HYPERFOCUS: TOMORROW X TOGETHER VR CONCERT — Meta Quest & Apple Vision Pro (Jun)
- Cha Eun-woo VR CONCERT : MEMORIES - Global Theater Tour (Jun)

== Awards and recognition ==
In 2023 and 2024, AMAZE was included in Fast Company's "Most Innovative Companies" list. The company was also a Webby Awards honoree for Best VR Headset Experience and received a Vega Digital Award for VR production.

== See also ==
- Music technology
- Concert film
