= Don't Shut Me Down =

2021 single by ABBA

- CD single cover

Single by ABBA

from the album Voyage
- A-side: "I Still Have Faith in You" (double A-side)
- Released: 2 September 2021
- Recorded: 2017–2021
- Genre: Pop; disco
- Length: 3:56
- Label: Polar
- Songwriters: Benny Andersson; Björn Ulvaeus
- Producers: Benny Andersson; Björn Ulvaeus

ABBA singles chronology
"Happy New Year" (1999)	"I Still Have Faith in You" / "Don't Shut Me Down" (2021)	"Just a Notion" (2021)

Lyric video
- "Don't Shut Me Down" on YouTube

"Don't Shut Me Down" is a song by Swedish pop music group ABBA. It was released as a single on 2 September 2021 as a dual single alongside "I Still Have Faith in You". Both songs are from the band's ninth studio album and its first in 40 years, Voyage. Agnetha Fältskog performs lead vocals. It became the first ABBA release to top the Swedish singles chart since "Summer Night City" in 1978.

The song was nominated for Record of the Year and Best Pop Duo/Group Performance at the 65th Annual Grammy Awards.

== Lyric video ==
ABBA released a lyric video on YouTube of "Don't Shut Me Down" to accompany the release. It was directed by Mike Anderson of the production company Able.

The lyric video gained 1.4 million views in 24 hours following its release, placing in the top three of YouTube's trending rankings in 12 countries, including the UK.

== Reception ==
"Don't Shut Me Down" became a comeback single for ABBA, charting in the top ten in eleven countries and reaching number one in Sweden and Switzerland, as well as the Euro Digital Songs chart.

The song received widely positive reviews from music critics. Kate Mossman of the New Statesman wrote: "Its opening has a West End feel, like Evita's tentative address to the masses, but then it whizzes with a 'Dancing Queen' mirrorball glissando into squelchy 1980s disco, giving the impression it's going to be straightforward. But then it mutates, and mutates into something wonderful and strange." Jon Pareles of The New York Times was similarly positive, calling the song "a strutting march with gleaming orchestration and scrubbing disco guitars, stolid and earnestly tuneful." The song was featured in Billboard magazine's list of the 100 best songs of 2021.

== Charts ==
Chart performance for "Don't Shut Me Down"
Chart (2021)	Peak position
Australia (ARIA)	27
Austria (Ö3 Austria Top 40)	14
Belgium (Ultratop 50 Flanders)	9
Belgium (Ultratop 50 Wallonia)	44
Canada Hot 100 (Billboard)	87
Croatia (ARC 100)	10
Denmark (Tracklisten)	7
Euro Digital Song Sales (Billboard)	1
Finland (Suomen virallinen lista)	3
Finland Airplay (Radiosoittolista)	18
Germany (GfK)	5
Global 200 (Billboard)	54
Hungary (Single Top 40)	4
Iceland (Tónlistinn)	3
Ireland (IRMA)	12
Japan Hot 100 (Billboard)	96
Latvia (EHR)	26
Netherlands (Single Top 100)	18
New Zealand (Recorded Music NZ)	31
Norway (VG-lista)	7
Portugal (AFP)	177
Sweden (Sverigetopplistan)	1
Switzerland (Schweizer Hitparade)	1
UK Singles (OCC)	9
US Digital Song Sales (Billboard)	32

== Certifications ==
Region	Certification	Certified units/sales
Sweden (GLF)	Platinum	8,000,000^{†}
United Kingdom (BPI)	Silver	200,000^{‡}
^{‡} Sales+streaming figures based on certification alone.^{†} Streaming-only figures based on certification alone.
