= I Still Have Faith in You =

2021 single by ABBA

- Double A-side single cover

Single by ABBA

from the album Voyage
- A-side: "Don't Shut Me Down" (double A-side)
- Released: 2 September 2021
- Recorded: June 2017
- Studio: RMV Studios, Stockholm
- Length: 5:10
- Label: Polar
- Songwriters: Benny Andersson; Björn Ulvaeus
- Producer: Benny Andersson

ABBA singles chronology
"Happy New Year" (1999)	"I Still Have Faith in You" / "Don't Shut Me Down" (2021)	"Just a Notion" (2021)

Music video
- "I Still Have Faith in You" on YouTube

"I Still Have Faith in You" is a song by Swedish pop music group ABBA. It was released on 2 September 2021 as a dual single alongside "Don't Shut Me Down" from the band's ninth studio album and first in 40 years, Voyage. Anni-Frid Lyngstad performs lead vocals.

The track has been described as "an ode to their friendship and to the bonds that have matured and survived despite divorce and heartbreak". It was also described as a power ballad, a "stately and epic ballad", and "an affectionate piano ballad portraying the bond the four band members share". The song received a nomination for Record of the Year at the 64th Annual Grammy Awards, marking ABBA's first-ever Grammy nomination.

== Background ==
"I Still Have Faith in You" is a power ballad with rock elements. In 2018, it was announced that the song had been recorded in June 2017 as one of two new songs. Key parts of the melody was based on a 2015 Benny Andersson instrumental, "Kyssen" (The Kiss), from the soundtrack to the Swedish film The Circle.

== Music video ==
The music video for the song features various pieces of archival footage of ABBA's 1977 and 1979 tours, outtakes from past music videos, and meet and greets. It also has the first appearance of the ABBAtars – digital avatars of the four members of ABBA looking like how they looked in the 1970s.

The video gained 4.4 million views in the first 24 hours following its release, placing in the top three of YouTube's trending rankings in 12 countries, including the UK.

== Critical reception ==
Mark Savage of the BBC complimented the track, writing that "[s]lowly, majestically, it builds to an astronomical climax, full of power chords and dazzling harmonies" and that "[i]f it feels like a victory lap, that's only fair". Helen Brown from The Independent stated "that this was precisely the stuff that would move fans the most". Kate Mossman of the New Statesman felt that the chorus has the ghost of "The Winner Takes It All" and that its "prettiest bits" go into low registers, which she noted is unusual for contemporary music. In the context of the album, Stephan Rehm Rozanes of Musikexpress opined that the track represented Voyage's "most emotional and courageous moment".

== Charts ==
Chart performance for "I Still Have Faith in You"
Chart (2021)	Peak position
Australia (ARIA)	39
Austria (Ö3 Austria Top 40)	19
Belgium (Ultratop 50 Flanders)	24
Canada Digital Song Sales (Billboard)	9
Croatia International Airplay (Top lista)	17
Denmark (Tracklisten)	17
Euro Digital Song Sales (Billboard)	2
Finland (Suomen virallinen lista)	7
Germany (GfK)	3
Global 200 (Billboard)	62
Hungary (Single Top 40)	11
Iceland (Tónlistinn)	38
Ireland (IRMA)	18
Netherlands (Single Top 100)	21
New Zealand Hot Singles (RMNZ)	6
Norway (VG-lista)	13
Sweden (Sverigetopplistan)	2
Switzerland (Schweizer Hitparade)	6
UK Singles (Official Charts)	14

== Certifications ==
Region	Certification	Certified units/sales
Sweden (GLF)	Platinum	8,000,000^{†}
^{†} Streaming-only figures based on certification alone.
