= ABBA discography =

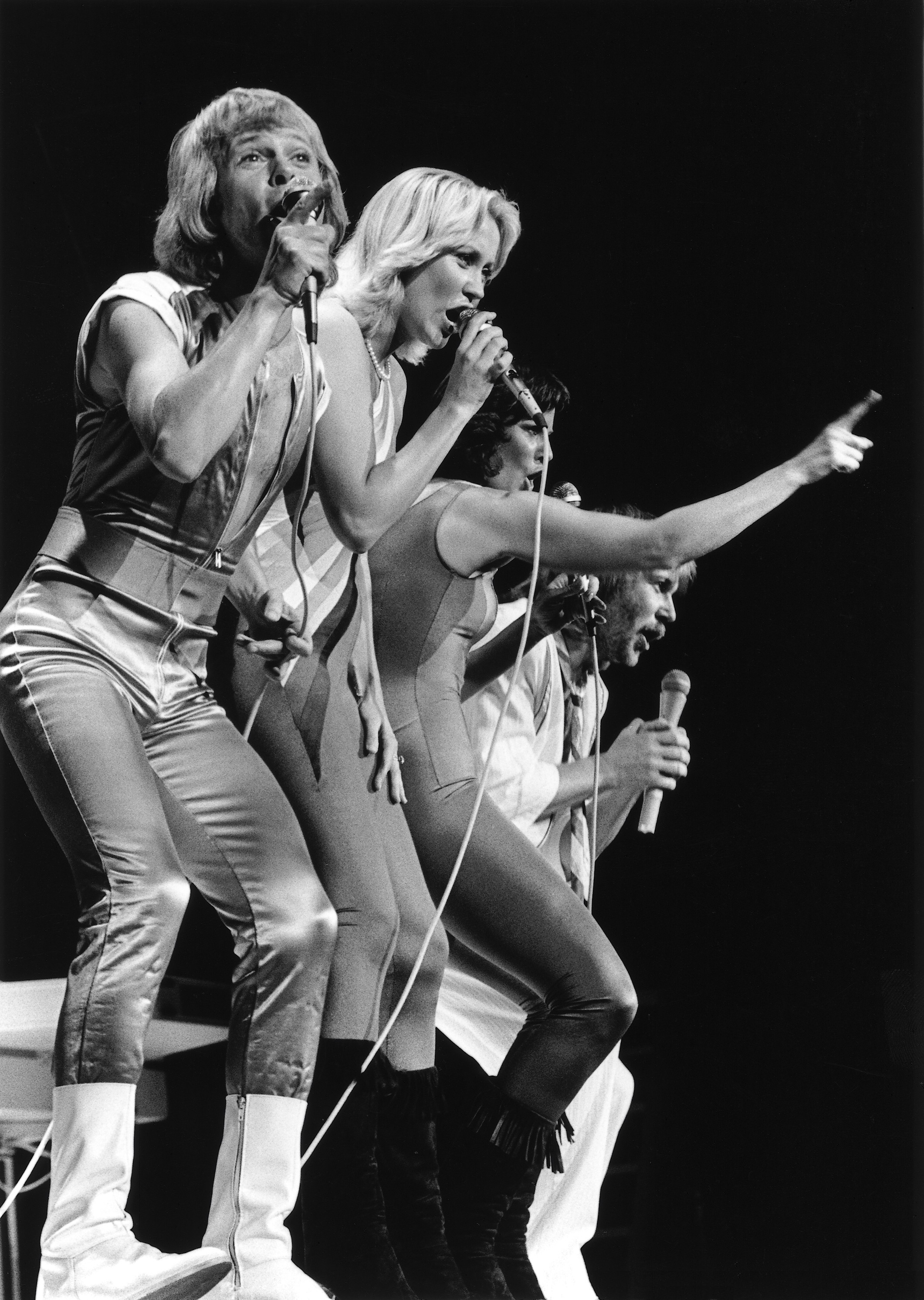
- ABBA performing in Edmonton, Canada, 1979
- Studio albums: 9
- Extended plays: 4
- Live albums: 2
- Compilation albums: 13
- Singles: 53
- Video albums: 16
- Music videos: 41
- Box sets: 4

Swedish pop group ABBA has released nine studio albums, two live albums, thirteen compilation albums, four box sets, sixteen video albums, 53 singles, and 41 music videos. They are one of the most popular and successful musical groups of all time, and are one of the best-selling music acts in the history of popular music. ABBA have sold an estimated 150 million to 400 million records worldwide. They have scored nine number-one singles and 10 number-one albums in the UK, becoming the most successful Swedish act of all time on the Official Charts, and were ranked third best-selling singles artists in the United Kingdom with a total of 11.3 million singles sold as of November 2012. In May 2023, ABBA were awarded the BRIT Billion Award, which celebrates those who have surpassed the milestone of one billion UK streams in their career.

ABBA's biggest hit singles worldwide are "Dancing Queen" and "Fernando", with Arrival being their biggest hit studio album.

The compilation album ABBA Gold is the second best-selling album of all time in the UK and has sold over 32 million copies worldwide.

== Albums ==
=== Studio albums ===
List of studio albums, with selected chart positions, sales figures, and certifications
Title	Album details	Peak chart positions										Sales	Certifications
Title	Album details	SWE	AUS	AUT	CAN	GER	NLD	NOR	NZ	UK	US	Sales	Certifications
Ring Ring	Released: 26 March 1973; Label: Polar; Formats: LP, CD, cassette, DD, 8-track	2	10	—	—	29	—	10	32	—	—	SWE: 116,627 (Note: Sweden sales figures for Ring Ring as of September 1979.); AUS: 142,000 (Note: Australia sales figures for Ring Ring as of January 1977.)	ARIA: 3× Platinum
Waterloo	Released: 4 March 1974; Label: Polar; Formats: LP, CD, cassette, DD, 8-track	1	18	—	—	6	74	1	38	28	145	SWE: 400,000 (Note: Sweden sales figures for Waterloo as of 1985.); AUS: 112,000 (Note: Australia sales figures for Waterloo as of January 1977.); WW: 3,000,000 (Note: Worldwide sales figures for Waterloo as of February 1977.)	ARIA: 2× Platinum; BPI: Silver; BVMI: Platinum
ABBA	Released: 21 April 1975; Label: Polar; Formats: LP, CD, cassette, DD, 8-track	1	1	—	55	31	3	1	3	13	174	SWE: 474,642 (Note: Sweden sales figures for ABBA as of September 1979.); AUS: 570,000 (Note: Australia sales figures for ABBA as of January 1977.); NOR: 120,000 (Note: Norway sales figures for ABBA as of March 1980.); WW: 4,000,000 (Note: Worldwide sales figures for ABBA as of February 1977.)	ARIA: 10× Platinum; BPI: Gold
Arrival	Released: 11 October 1976; Label: Polar; Formats: LP, CD, cassette, DD, 8-track	1	1	12	4	1	1	1	1	1	20	SWE: 740,000 (Note: Sweden sales figures for Arrival.); AUS: 1,000,000 (Note: Australia sales figures for Arrival as of October 2024.); NLD: 500,000 (Note: Netherlands sales figures for Arrival as of September 1979.); NOR: 167,000 (Note: Norway sales figures for Arrival as of March 1980.); NZ: 60,000 (Note: New Zealand sales figures for Arrival as of September 1979.); UK: 1,700,000 (Note: United Kingdom sales figures for Arrival as of November 2021.); WW: 10,000,000 (Note: Worldwide sales figures for Arrival.)	ARIA: 18× Platinum; BPI: Platinum; BVMI: 2× Platinum; MC: 2× Platinum; NVPI: Gold; RIAA: Gold; RMNZ: 5× Platinum
ABBA: The Album	Released: 12 December 1977; Label: Polar; Formats: LP, CD, cassette, DD, 8-track	1	4	2	8	2	1	1	1	1	14	SWE: 753,420 (Note: Sweden sales figures for Abba: The Album as of September 1979.); NOR: 200,840 (Note: Norway sales figures for Abba: The Album as of September 1979.); UK: 1,000,000 (Note: United Kingdom sales figures for Abba: The Album as of July 1978.); US: 1,300,000 (Note: United States sales figures for Abba: The Album as of May 1979.)	ARIA: Platinum; BPI: Platinum; BVMI: Platinum; MC: 2× Platinum; NVPI: Platinum; RIAA: Platinum
Voulez-Vous	Released: 23 April 1979; Label: Polar; Formats: LP, CD, cassette, DD, 8-track	1	5	2	6	1	1	1	2	1	19	SWE: 289,925 (Note: Sweden sales figures for Voulez-Vous as of September 1979.); AUS: 200,000 (Note: Australia sales figures for Voulez-Vous as of May 1980.); CAN: 100,000 (Note: Canada sales figures for Voulez-Vous as of September 1979.); UK: 1,000,000 (Note: United Kingdom sales figures for Voulez-Vous as 1979.); US: 500,000 (Note: United States sales figures for Voulez-Vous.)	ARIA: 4× Platinum; BPI: Platinum; BVMI: Platinum; MC: 2× Platinum; NVPI: Platinum; RIAA: Gold; RMNZ: Platinum
Super Trouper	Released: 3 November 1980; Label: Polar; Formats: LP, CD, cassette, DD, 8-track	1	5	3	10	1	1	1	5	1	17	CAN: 400,000 (Note: Canada sales figures for Super Trouper as of March 1981.); GER: 1,000,000 (Note: Germany sales figures for Super Trouper as of August 1981.); UK: 1,250,000 (Note: United Kingdom sales figures for Super Trouper as of January 1981.); WW: 8,000,000 (Note: Worldwide sales figures for Super Trouper.)	ARIA: Platinum; BPI: Platinum; BVMI: 2× Platinum; RIAA: Gold; RMNZ: Platinum
The Visitors	Released: 30 November 1981; Label: Polar; Formats: LP, CD, cassette, DD, 8-track	1	22	3	18	1	1	1	19	1	29	GER: 750,000 (Note: Germany sales figures for The Visitors as of May 1983.); WW: 5,000,000 (Note: Worldwide sales figures for The Visitors as of October 2023.)	ARIA: Gold; BPI: Platinum; BVMI: Platinum; GLF: Platinum
Voyage	Released: 5 November 2021; Label: Polar, Universal; Formats: LP, CD, cassette, digital download, streaming	1	1	1	2	1	1	1	1	1	2	GER: 400,000 (Note: Germany sales figures for Voyage as of December 2021.); NLD: 40,000 (Note: Netherlands first-week sales figures for Voyage.); UK: 474,955 (Note: United Kingdom sales figures for Voyage as of June 2023.); US: 218,000 (Note: United States sales figures for Voyage as of January 2023.); WW: 2,500,000 (Note: Worldwide sales figures for Voyage as of November 2022.)	GLF: 2× Platinum; ARIA: Gold; BPI: Platinum; BVMI: 2× Platinum; IFPI AUT: 2× Platinum
"—" denotes items which were not released in that country or failed to chart.

=== Compilation albums ===
List of compilation albums, with selected chart positions, sales figures, and certifications
Title	Album details	Peak chart positions										Sales	Certifications
Title	Album details	SWE	AUS	AUT	CAN	GER	NLD	NOR	NZ	UK	US	Sales	Certifications
The Best of ABBA	Released: August 1975; Label: PolyGram; Formats: LP, CD, cassette, 8-track	—	1	1	—	1	7	14	1	—	—	AUS: 1,210,000 (Note: Australia sales figures for The Best of ABBA as of January 2013.); NLD: 500,000 (Note: Netherlands sales figures for The Best of ABBA as of September 1979.); NZ: 250,000 (Note: New Zealand sales figures for The Best of ABBA as of September 1979.)	ARIA: 22× Platinum; BVMI: Platinum; MC: Gold; RMNZ: 24× Platinum
Greatest Hits	Released: 17 November 1975; Label: Polar; Formats: LP, CD, cassette, DD, 8-track	1	—	—	2	—	—	1	—	1	48	SWE: 293,163 (Note: Sweden sales figures for Greatest Hits as of September 1979.); AUS: 900,000 (Note: Australia sales figures for Greatest Hits as of 1985.); CAN: 600,000 (Note: Canada sales figures for Greatest Hits as of September 1979.); UK: 2,606,000 (Note: United Kingdom sales figures for Greatest Hits as of July 2016.); US: 1,000,000 (Note: United States sales figures for Greatest Hits as of May 1979.); WW: 6,000,000 (Note: Worldwide sales figures for Greatest Hits as of 1985.)	BPI: 8× Platinum; BVMI: Gold; MC: 5× Platinum; RIAA: Platinum
Greatest Hits Vol. 2	Released: 29 October 1979; Label: Polar; Formats: LP, CD, cassette, 8-track	20	20	2	8	6	2	25	3	1	46	AUS: 100,000 (Note: Australia sales figures for Greatest Hits Vol. 2 as of May 1980.); UK: 1,000,000 (Note: United Kingdom sales figures for Greatest Hits Vol. 2.); WW: 2,000,000 (Note: Worldwide sales figures for Greatest Hits Vol. 2.)	ARIA: 2× Platinum; BPI: Platinum; BVMI: Platinum; NVPI: Platinum; RIAA: Gold
Gracias Por La Música	Released: 23 June 1980; Label: Septima Records; Formats: LP, cassette, 8-track	—	—	—	—	—	—	—	—	—	—		
The Singles: The First Ten Years	Released: 8 November 1982; Label: Polar; Formats: LP, CD, cassette, 8-track	29	18	—	24	5	5	33	5	1	62		ARIA: Gold; BPI: Platinum; BVMI: Gold
ABBA Gold	Released: 21 September 1992; Label: PolyGram; Formats: LP, CD, cassette, DD	1	1	1	4	1	3	1	3	1	25	AUS: 870,000 (Note: Australia sales figures for ABBA Gold as of January 2013.); UK: 5,610,000 (Note: United Kingdom sales figures for ABBA Gold as of July 2021.); US: 6,684,000 (Note: United States combined sales figures for ABBA Gold as of May 2018. The album has sold 5,800,000 in the US according to Nielsen SoundScan, with an additional 884,000 sold at BMG Music Clubs. Nielsen SoundScan does not count albums sold through clubs like the BMG Music Service, which were significantly popular in the 1990s.); WW: 32,000,000 (Note: Worldwide sales figures for ABBA Gold as of 2022.)	GLF: 5× Platinum; ARIA: 17× Platinum; BPI: 23× Platinum; BVMI: 5× Platinum; IFPI AUT: 3× Platinum; IFPI NOR: 2× Platinum; MC: Diamond; NVPI: 3× Platinum; RIAA: 6× Platinum; RMNZ: 16× Platinum
More ABBA Gold: More ABBA Hits	Released: 24 May 1993; Label: PolyGram; Formats: LP, CD, cassette, DD	3	38	7	—	9	10	16	—	13	—		GLF: Platinum; BPI: Platinum; BVMI: Gold; IFPI AUT: Gold; MC: Gold
ABBA Oro: Grandes Éxitos	Released: 24 September 1993; Label: Polydor, Universal Music; Formats: LP, CD, cassette	—	—	—	—	—	—	—	—	—	—		
Love Stories	Released: 26 October 1998; Label: PolyGram; Formats: LP, CD, cassette	—	—	15	—	82	—	30	24	51	—		
The Definitive Collection	Released: 2 November 2001; Label: PolyGram, Universal Music; Formats: CD, DD	26	10	38	—	14	39	8	9	17	186	US: 342,000 (Note: United States sales figures for The Definitive Collection as of January 2009.)	GLF: Gold; ARIA: 2× Platinum; BPI: Gold; BVMI: Platinum
18 Hits	Released: 8 September 2005; Label: PolyGram, Universal Music; Formats: CD, DD	—	32	—	—	58	—	—	—	15	—		ARIA: 4× Platinum; BPI: Platinum; BVMI: 2× Platinum
Number Ones	Released: 20 November 2006; Label: PolyGram, Universal Music; Formats: CD, DD	20	36	22	—	24	47	25	1	15	—		BPI: Gold; BVMI: Gold
The Singles: The First Fifty Years	Released: 25 October 2024; Label: Polar; Formats: CD, DD, LP	—	42	12	—	5	12	—	—	17	—		
"—" denotes items which were not released in that country or failed to chart.

=== Other compilation albums ===
List of other compilation albums, with selected chart positions, sales figures, and certifications
Title	Album details	Peak chart positions										Sales	Certifications
Title	Album details	AUT	CAN	GER	JPN	NLD	NZ	SPA	SWI	UK	US	Sales	Certifications
The Very Best of ABBA: ABBA's Greatest Hits	Released: 1976 (Germany)	19	—	2	—	—	—	—	—	—	—		BVMI: 3× Gold; NVPI: Platinum
Honey-Honey	Released: April 1975	—	—	—	—	—	—	—	—	—	—		
ABBA (Björn, Benny, Agnetha & Frida)	Released: 1976 (Czechoslovakia)	—	—	—	—	—	—	—	—	—	—		
Golden Double Album	Released: 1976 (France)	—	—	—	—	—	—	—	—	—	—		
ABBA Greatest Hits 24	Released: 1977 (Japan)	—	—	—	—	—	—	—	—	—	—		
All About ABBA	Released: November 1978 (Japan)	—	—	—	—	—	—	—	—	—	—	JPN: 220,000 (Note: Japan sales figures for All About ABBA as of March 1979.)	
The Magic of ABBA	Released: 1980	—	—	—	—	—	—	—	—	—	—		ARIA: Gold
A Wie ABBA/A Van ABBA	Released: 1981 (Germany/Netherlands)	1	—	1	—	1	—	—	—	—	—		BVMI: Gold
Very Best of ABBA	Released: 5 July 1981 (Japan)	—	—	—	—	—	—	—	—	—	—		
Thank You for the Music	Released: 11 November 1983 (UK)	—	—	—	—	—	—	—	—	17	—		BPI: Gold
I Love ABBA	Released: 1983	5	—	10	—	—	—	—	14	—	—		
Love Songs – A Very Special Collection	Released: 7 May 1984 (Canada)	—	72	—	—	—	—	—	—	—	—		
From ABBA with Love	Released: 1984 (Netherlands)	—	—	—	—	6	—	—	—	—	—		
Absolute ABBA	Released: 1988	—	—	—	—	—	—	—	—	70	—		BPI: Gold
The Love Songs	Released: 1989	—	—	—	—	18	—	—	—	—	—		
The Music Still Goes On	Released: 16 April 1996 (Australia); Label: Atlantic; Formats: CD, Cassette, LP	—	—	—	—	—	—	—	—	—	—		BPI: Gold
25 Jaar Na Waterloo	Released: 2 April 1999 (Netherlands)	—	—	—	—	1	—	—	—	—	—		NVPI: 3× Platinum
25 Jaar Na Waterloo – Deel 2	Released: 10 September 1999 (Netherlands)	—	—	—	—	7	—	—	—	—	—		NVPI: Platinum
The Complete Singles Collection	Released: 23 November 1999 (Germany); Label: Polydor/Universal; Formats: CD, Cassette	11	—	10	—	—	—	—	6	—	—		BVMI: Platinum; IFPI SWI: Gold
20th Century Masters – The Millennium Collection: The Best of ABBA	Released: 26 September 2000; Label: Atlantic; Formats: CD, Cassette	—	20	—	—	—	—	—	—	—	189	US: 1,090,000 (Note: United States sales figures for 20th Century Masters – The Millennium Collection: The Best of ABBA as of January 2009.)	MC: Platinum; RIAA: Gold
SOS: The Best of ABBA	Released: 7 February 2001 (Japan); Label: Atlantic; Formats: CD	—	—	—	3	—	—	—	—	—	—		RIAJ: 3× Platinum
The Name of the Game	Released: 22 November 2002; Label: Atlantic; Format: CD	—	—	—	126	—	—	—	—	—	—		GLF: Platinum; BPI: Platinum
The Ultimate Collection	Released: 2003; Format: CD	—	—	—	—	—	—	—	—	—	—		BPI: Gold
The ABBA Story	Released: 6 July 2004 (GER); Label: Atlantic; Formats: CD, Digital Download	21	—	31	—	—	—	—	14	—	—		
Todo ABBA	Released: 2004; Format: CD	—	—	—	—	—	—	4	—	—	—		
Classic ABBA: The Universal Masters Collection	Released: 4 August 2006; Format: CD	—	—	—	—	—	—	—	—	—	—		
Classic ABBA	Released: 2009; Label: Spectrum Music; Formats:	—	—	—	—	—	—	—	—	—	—		BPI: Silver
Icon	Released: 2010; Format: CD	—	71	—	—	—	24	—	—	—	—		MC: Platinum
The Essential Collection	Released: 2012; Format: CD	47	—	16	—	—	—	53	—	—	—		BVMI: Gold
40/40 The Best Selection	Released: 2014 (Japan); Label: Universal Music Japan; Format: CD	—	—	—	26	—	—	—	—	—	—		
"—" denotes items which were not released in that country or failed to chart.

=== Live albums ===
List of live albums, with selected chart positions and certifications
Title	Album details	Peak chart positions										Certifications
Title	Album details	SWE	AUT	BEL (FLA)	DEN	FIN	FRA	GER	NLD	SWI	UK	Certifications
ABBA Live	Released: 18 August 1986; Label: Polar, Universal; Formats: LP, CD	49	—	—	—	—	—	—	47	—	—	
Live at Wembley Arena	Released: 29 September 2014; Label: Polar, Universal; Formats: LP, CD	15	9	16	16	50	87	9	12	10	30	GLF: Platinum
"—" denotes items which were not released in that country or failed to chart.

=== Box sets ===
List of box sets, with selected chart positions and certifications
Title	Album details	Peak chart positions									Certifications
Title	Album details	SWE	AUS	DEN	FRA	GER	ITA	NLD	NOR	UK	Certifications
Thank You for the Music	Released: 31 October 1994; Label: PolyGram; Formats: 4×CD, digital download	17	76	—	—	—	—	—	—	—	
The Complete Studio Recordings	Released: 7 November 2005; Label: Universal Music; Formats: 9×CD + 2×DVD	—	—	6	—	—	—	—	—	—	
The Albums	Released: 11 November 2008; Label: Universal Music; Formats: 9×CD, digital download	4	—	10	57	24	48	37	7	89	GLF: Platinum; BPI: Silver
Album Box Set	Released: 27 May 2022; Label: Universal Music; Formats: 10×CD	—	36	—	—	11	—	68	—	—	
"—" denotes items which were not released in that country or failed to chart.

== Extended plays ==
List of extended plays, with selected chart positions
Title	Extended play details	Peak chart positions
Title	Extended play details	AUS
Waterloo/Watch Out/Ring Ring/Rock'n Roll Band	Released: December 1974 (Australia); Reissued: October 1979; Label: RCA Victor; Formats: 7”	60
Live 77	Released: 1977 (Sweden); Label: Jultidningsförlaget; Formats: 7” Flexi-Disc	—
Greatest Original Hits – 4 Track E.P.	Released: 1982 (UK); Label: Epic, 4 Star Track E.P.; Formats: 7”, Cassette	—
ABBA	Released: 1983 (Germany); Label: Amiga; Formats: 7”	—
"—" denotes items which were not released in that country or failed to chart.

== Singles ==
=== 1970s ===
List of singles released in the 1970s, showing year released, selected chart positions, sales, certifications, and originating album
Title	Year	Peak chart positions										Sales	Certifications	Album
Title	Year	SWE	AUS	AUT	GER	IRE	NLD	NZ	UK	SWI	US	Sales	Certifications	Album
"People Need Love"	1972	17	—	—	—	—	— (Note: "People Need Love" did not enter the Dutch Single Top 100, but peaked at number 47 on the Radio Noordzee Top 50 chart.)	—	— (Note: "People Need Love" did not enter the UK Singles Chart, but peaked at number 47 on the UK Singles Sales Chart and number four on the UK Physical Singles Chart.)	—	— (Note: "People Need Love" did not enter the US Billboard Hot 100, but peaked at number 114 on the US Top 100 Looking Ahead Chart and 117 on the US Singles Chart.)			Ring Ring
"He Is Your Brother"	1972	— (Note: "He Is Your Brother" did not enter the Swedish combined singles and album chart Kvällstoppen, but peaked at number one on the Tio i Topp Singles Chart.)	—	—	—	—	—	—	— (Note: "He Is Your Brother" did not enter the UK Singles Chart, but peaked at number 46 on the UK Singles Sales Chart and number three on the UK Physical Singles Chart.)	—	—			Ring Ring
"Ring Ring"	1973	1	7 (Note: "Ring Ring" peaked at number 92 in Australia in 1973, but reached number 7 in 1976 on subsequent release.)	2	—	—	5	17	32	—	—	SWE: 100,000 (Note: Sweden sales figures for "Ring Ring" as of June 1973.); UK: 5,000 (Note: United Kingdom sales figures for "Ring Ring" as of October 1973.)	GLF: Gold	Ring Ring
"Another Town, Another Train"	1973	— (Note: "Another Town, Another Train" did not enter the Swedish combined singles and album chart Kvällstoppen, but peaked at number two on the Tio i Topp Singles Chart.)	—	—	—	—	—	—	—	—	—			Ring Ring
"I Am Just a Girl"	1973	— (Note: "I Am Just a Girl" did not enter the Swedish combined singles and album chart Kvällstoppen, but peaked at number six on the Tio i Topp Singles Chart.)	—	—	—	—	—	—	—	—	—			Ring Ring
"Love Isn't Easy (But It Sure Is Hard Enough)"	1973	— (Note: "Love Isn't Easy (But It Sure Is Hard Enough)" did not enter the Swedish combined singles and album chart Kvällstoppen, but peaked at number three on the Tio i Topp Singles Chart.)	—	—	—	—	—	—	— (Note: "Love Isn't Easy (But It Sure Is Hard Enough)" did not enter the UK Singles Chart, but peaked at number 48 on the UK Singles Sales Chart and number five on the UK Physical Singles Chart.)	—	—			Ring Ring
"Rock'n Roll Band"	1973	—	—	—	—	—	—	—	—	—	—			Ring Ring
"Nina, Pretty Ballerina"	1973	—	—	8	—	—	—	—	—	—	—			Ring Ring
"Waterloo"	1974	2	4	2	1	1	1	3	1	1	6	SWE: 100,000 (Note: Sweden sales figures for "Waterloo".); FRA: 500,000 (Note: France sales figures for "Waterloo" as of September 1979.); IRE: 50,000 (Note: Ireland sales figures for "Waterloo" as of September 1979.); UK: 681,000 (Note: United Kingdom sales figures for "Waterloo" as of November 2021.); US: 800,000 (Note: United States sales figures for "Waterloo".); WW: 5,000,000 (Note: Worldwide sales figures for "Waterloo" as of February 1977.)	BPI: Platinum; RMNZ: Platinum	Waterloo
"Honey, Honey"	1974	—	30	4	2	—	17	—	— (Note: "Honey Honey" did not enter the UK Singles Chart, but peaked at number 26 on the UK Singles Sales Chart and number 3 on the UK Physical Singles Chart.)	4	27	WW: 1,000,000 (Note: Worldwide sales figures for "Honey, Honey" as of February 1977.)	BPI: Silver	Waterloo
"Hasta Mañana"	1974	— (Note: "Hasta Mañana" did not enter the Swedish combined singles and album chart Kvällstoppen, but peaked at number one on the Tio i Topp Singles Chart.)	16	—	—	—	—	9	—	—	—			Waterloo
"So Long"	1974	7	—	3	11	—	—	—	— (Note: "So Long" did not enter the UK Top 50 Singles Chart, but appeared in the Longer List of Breakers Chart. A 2025 reissue saw the song peak at number 29 on the UK Singles Sales Chart and number 3 on the UK Physical Singles Chart.)	—	—	WW: 1,000,000 (Note: Worldwide sales figures for "So Long" as of February 1977.)		ABBA
"I've Been Waiting for You"	1974	—	49	—	—	—	—	8	—	—	—			ABBA
"I Do, I Do, I Do, I Do, I Do"	1975	—	1	4	6	—	3	1	38	1	15	FRA: 500,000 (Note: France sales figures for "I Do, I Do, I Do, I Do, I Do" as of September 1979.); WW: 2,500,000 (Note: Worldwide sales figures for "I Do, I Do, I Do, I Do, I Do" as of February 1977.)	ARIA: 10× Gold; ARIA: 10× Gold; BPI: Silver	ABBA
"Bang-A-Boomerang"	1975	—	—	—	—	—	—	—	—	—	—			ABBA
"SOS"	1975	— (Note: "SOS" did not enter the Swedish Singellista Chart upon original release, but peaked at number 12 on the Swedish Heatseeker Chart in 2021.)	1	2	1	4	2	1	6	3	15	FRA: 500,000 (Note: France sales figures for "SOS" as of September 1979.); GER: 500,000 (Note: Germany sales figures for "SOS" as of April 1976.); UK: 170,000 (Note: United Kingdom physical sales figures for "SOS" as of October 2010.); WW: 4,000,000 (Note: Worldwide sales figures for "SOS" as of February 1977.)	ARIA: 5× Gold; BPI: Platinum; RMNZ: Platinum	ABBA
"Mamma Mia"	1975	64	1	3	1	1	12	2	1	1	32	GER: 300,000 (Note: Germany sales figures for "Mamma Mia" as of April 1976.); UK: 766,000 (Note: United Kingdom sales figures for "Mamma Mia" as of November 2021.); US: 193,000 (Note: United States sales figures for "Mamma Mia" as of January 2009.); WW: 3,500,000 (Note: Worldwide sales figures for "Mamma Mia" as of February 1977.)	GLF: 4× Platinum; ARIA: 9× Gold; BPI: 2× Platinum; BVMI: Gold; RMNZ: 3× Platinum	ABBA
"Rock Me"	1976	—	4	—	—	—	—	2	—	—	—			ABBA
"Fernando"	1976	2	1	1	1	1	1	1	1	1	13	AUS: 720,000 (Note: Australia sales figures for "Fernando" as of November 1979.); AUT: 2,000 (Note: Austria sales figures for "Fernando" as of September 1979.); FRA: 500,000 (Note: France sales figures for "Fernando" as of September 1979.); GER: 600,000 (Note: Germany sales figures for "Fernando" as of November 1976.); IRE: 50,000 (Note: Ireland sales figures for "Fernando" as of September 1979.); UK: 874,000 (Note: United Kingdom sales figures for "Fernando" as of November 2021.); WW: 10,000,000 (Note: Worldwide sales figures for "Fernando" as of 1977.)	ARIA: 25× Gold; BPI: Gold; BVMI: Gold; MC: Gold; RMNZ: Platinum; SNEP: Gold	Greatest Hits
"Dancing Queen"	1976	1	1	4	1	1	1	1	1	3	1	AUS: 322,000 (Note: Australia sales figures for "Dancing Queen" as of January 1977.); FRA: 200,000 (Note: France sales figures for "Dancing Queen" as of 1976.); IRE: 50,000 (Note: Ireland sales figures for "Dancing Queen" as of September 1979.); NLD: 150,000 (Note: Netherlands sales figures for "Dancing Queen" as of January 1977.); UK: 1,560,000 (Note: United Kingdom sales figures for "Dancing Queen" as of November 2021.); US: 1,597,000 (Note: United States sales figures for "Dancing Queen" as of January 2009.); WW: 4,000,000 (Note: Worldwide sales figures for "Dancing Queen" as of 1985.)	ARIA: 20× Gold; BPI: 4× Platinum* BPI: 3× Platinum; BVMI: Gold; RIAA: Gold; RMNZ: 6× Platinum	Arrival
"Money, Money, Money"	1976	—	1	3	1	2	1	1	3	2	56	AUS: 244,000 (Note: Australia sales figures for "Money Money Money" as of January 1977.); FRA: 500,000 (Note: France sales figures for "Money Money Money" as of 1976.); GER: 300,000 (Note: Germany sales figures for "Money Money Money" as of September 1979.); UK: 500,000 (Note: United Kingdom sales figures for "Money Money Money" as of February 1977.); WW: 3,000,000 (Note: Worldwide sales figures for "Money Money Money" as of 1985.)	ARIA: 13× Gold; BPI: Gold; RMNZ: Platinum; SNEP: Gold	Arrival
"Knowing Me, Knowing You"	1977	—	9	2	1	1	2	8	1	3	14	FRA: 300,000 (Note: France sales figures for "Knowing Me, Knowing You" as of 1977.); GER: 300,000 (Note: Germany sales figures for "Knowing Me, Knowing You" as of September 1979.); UK: 976,000 (Note: United Kingdom sales figures for "Knowing Me, Knowing You" as of November 2021.)	BPI: Platinum; MC: Gold; RMNZ: Platinum	Arrival
"King Kong Song"	1977	— (Note: "King Kong Song" did not enter the Swedish combined singles and album chart Kvällstoppen, but peaked at number four on the Tio i Topp Singles Chart.)	94	—	—	—	—	—	—	—	—			Waterloo
"That's Me"	1977	—	—	—	—	—	—	—	—	—	—			Arrival
"The Name of the Game"	1977	2	6	12	7	2	2	4	1	6	12	FRA: 100,000 (Note: France sales figures for "The Name of the Game" as of 1977.); SWE: 140,000 (Note: Sweden sales figures for "The Name of the Game" as of November 1977.); UK: 700,000 (Note: United Kingdom sales figures for "The Name of the Game" as of October 2010.)	BPI: Gold	ABBA: The Album
"Take a Chance on Me"	1978	— (Note: "Take a Chance on Me" did not enter the Swedish Singellista Chart upon original release, but peaked at number 11 on the Swedish Heatseeker Chart in 2021.)	12	1	3	1	2	14	1	3	3	FRA: 250,000 (Note: France sales figures for "Take a Chance on Me" as of 1978.); UK: 885,000 (Note: United Kingdom sales figures for "Take a Chance on Me" as of November 2021.); US: 1,234,000 (Note: United States sales figures for "Take a Chance on Me" as of January 2009.); WW: 2,000,000 (Note: Worldwide sales figures for "Take a Chance on Me" as of 1985.)	BPI: Platinum; MC: Gold; RIAA: Gold; RMNZ: 2× Platinum	ABBA: The Album
"Eagle"	1978	—	82	17	6	—	7	—	— (Note: "Eagle" did not enter the UK Singles Chart, but peaked at number 2 on the UK Physical Singles Chart.)	7	—	FRA: 80,000 (Note: France sales figures for "Eagle" as of 1978.)		ABBA: The Album
"Thank You for the Music"	1978	—	82	—	—	17	7	—	33	—	—	UK: 80,000 (Note: United Kingdom sales figures for "Thank You for the Music" as of October 2010.)	BPI: Gold; RMNZ: Gold	ABBA: The Album
"Summer Night City"	1978	1	13	18	6	1	10	37	5	5	—	FRA: 100,000 (Note: France sales figures for "Summer Night City" as of 1978.); UK: 250,000 (Note: United Kingdom sales figures for "Summer Night City" as of October 2010.)	BPI: Silver	Greatest Hits Vol. 2
"Chiquitita"	1979	2	4	6	3	1	1	1	2	1	29	FRA: 150,000 (Note: France sales figures for "Chiquitita" as of 1979.); IRE: 50,000 (Note: Ireland sales figures for "Chiquitita" as of September 1979.); UK: 575,000 (Note: United Kingdom sales figures for "Chiquitita" as of October 2010.)	BPI: Platinum; NVPI: Gold; RMNZ: Platinum	Voulez-Vous
"Does Your Mother Know"	1979	— (Note: "Does Your Mother Know" did not enter the Swedish Singellista Chart upon original release, but peaked at number 15 on the Swedish Heatseeker Chart in 2021.)	7	13	10	3	3	27	4	6	19	FRA: 80,000 (Note: France sales figures for "Does Your Mother Know" as of 1979.); UK: 375,000 (Note: United Kingdom sales figures for "Does Your Mother Know" as of October 2010.)	BPI: Platinum; RMNZ: Platinum	Voulez-Vous
"Voulez-Vous"	1979	— (Note: "Voulez-Vous" did not enter the Swedish Singellista Chart upon original release, but peaked at number 18 on the Swedish Heatseeker Chart in 2021.)	79	—	14	3	3	—	3	9	80	FRA: 100,000 (Note: France sales figures for "Voulez-Vous" as of 1979.); UK: 480,000 (Note: United Kingdom sales figures for "Angeleyes"/ "Voulez-Vous" as of October 2010.)	BPI: Platinum; RMNZ: Gold	Voulez-Vous
"Angeleyes"	1979	—	—	—	—	3	—	—	3	—	64	UK: 480,000 (Note: United Kingdom sales figures for "Angeleyes"/ "Voulez-Vous" as of October 2010.)	BPI: Gold; RMNZ: Gold	Voulez-Vous
"Gimme! Gimme! Gimme! (A Man After Midnight)"	1979	16	8	2	3	1	2	15	3	1	—	FRA: 600,000 (Note: France sales figures for "Gimme! Gimme! Gimme! (A Man After Midnight)" as of 1979.); UK: 490,000 (Note: United Kingdom sales figures for "Gimme! Gimme! Gimme! (A Man After Midnight)" as of October 2010.)	BPI: 2× Platinum; BVMI: Gold; NVPI: Gold; RMNZ: 3× Platinum; SNEP: Gold	Greatest Hits Vol. 2
"As Good as New"	1979	—	—	—	—	—	—	—	—	—	—			Voulez-Vous
"I Have a Dream"	1979	—	64	1	4	2	1	—	2	1	—	UK: 570,000 (Note: United Kingdom sales figures for "I Have a Dream" as of October 2010.)	BPI: Gold; NVPI: Gold; RMNZ: Gold	Voulez-Vous
"—" denotes the single failed to chart or was not released.

=== 1980s ===
List of singles released in the 1980s, showing year released, selected chart positions, sales, certifications, and originating album
Title	Year	Peak chart positions									Sales	Certifications	Album
Title	Year	SWE	AUS	AUT	GER	IRE	NLD	NOR	UK	US	Sales	Certifications	Album
"The Winner Takes It All"	1980	2	7	3	4	1	1	3	1	8	FRA: 250,000 (Note: France sales figures for "The Winner Takes It All" as of 1980.); UK: 853,000 (Note: United Kingdom sales figures for "The Winner Takes It All" as of November 2021.)	BPI: 2× Platinum; BVMI: Gold; NVPI: Gold	Super Trouper
"On and On and On"	1980	—	9	—	—	—	—	—	—	90			Super Trouper
"Super Trouper"	1980	11	77	3	1	1	1	2	1	45	FRA: 400,000 (Note: France sales figures for "Super Trouper" as of 1980.); UK: 983,000 (Note: United Kingdom sales figures for "Super Trouper" as of November 2021.)	BPI: Platinum	Super Trouper
"Happy New Year"	1980	4	—	—	75	—	8	4	— (Note: "Happy New Year" did not enter the UK Singles Chart, but peaked at number 5 on the UK Singles Sales Chart and number 1 on the UK Physical Singles Chart.)	—			Super Trouper
"Andante, Andante"	1981	—	—	—	—	—	—	—	— (Note: "Andante, Andante" did not enter the UK Singles Chart, but peaked at number 91 on the UK Singles Downloads Chart.)	—			Super Trouper
"Lay All Your Love on Me"	1981	68	—	—	26	8	—	—	7	—	UK: 200,000 (Note: United Kingdom sales figures for "Lay All Your Love on Me" as of October 2010.)	BPI: Platinum; BVMI: Gold	Super Trouper
"One of Us"	1981	13	48	3	1	1	1	6	3	— (Note: "One of Us" did not enter the US Billboard Hot 100, but peaked at number seven on the Bubbling Under Hot 100 chart.)	FRA: 200,000 (Note: France sales figures for "One of Us" as of 1982.); UK: 405,000 (Note: United Kingdom sales figures for "One of Us" as of October 2010.)	BPI: Gold	The Visitors
"When All Is Said and Done"	1981	—	81	—	—	—	—	—	—	27			The Visitors
"Head over Heels"	1982	—	—	8	19	14	1	—	25	—	FRA: 80,000 (Note: France sales figures for "Head over Heels" as of 1982.)		The Visitors
"The Visitors"	1982	—	—	—	—	—	—	—	—	63			The Visitors
"The Day Before You Came"	1982	3	48	16	5	12	3	5	32	—			The Singles: The First Ten Years
"Under Attack"	1982	—	96	—	22	11	7	—	26	—			The Singles: The First Ten Years
"—" denotes the single failed to chart or was not released.

=== 2020s ===
List of singles released in the 2020s, showing year released, selected chart positions, sales, certifications, and originating album
Title	Year	Peak chart positions										Sales	Certifications	Album
Title	Year	SWE	AUS	AUT	GER	IRE	NLD	NOR	NZ Hot	UK	WW	Sales	Certifications	Album
"I Still Have Faith in You"	2021	2	39	19	3	18	21	13	6	14	62	UK: 70,038 (Note: United Kingdom sales figures for "I Still Have Faith in You" as of December 2021.)	GLF: Platinum	Voyage
"Don't Shut Me Down"	2021	1	27	14	5	12	18	7	5	9	54	UK: 100,005 (Note: United Kingdom sales figures for "Don't Shut Me Down" as of December 2021.)	GLF: Platinum; BPI: Silver	Voyage
"Just a Notion"	2021	22	—	—	36	—	73	—	27	59	—			Voyage
"Little Things"	2021	20	—	—	42	—	—	—	37	61	—			Voyage
"No Doubt About It"	2022	29	—	—	—	—	—	—	—	— (Note: "No Doubt About It" did not enter the UK Singles Chart, but peaked at number 72 on the UK Singles Sales Chart and number 69 on the UK Singles Downloads Chart.)	—			Voyage
"—" denotes the single failed to chart or was not released.

=== Promotional singles ===
List of promotional singles, showing year released, certifications, and originating album
Title	Year	Peak chart positions	Certifications	Album
Title	Year	UK	Certifications	Album
"En Hälsning Till Våra Parkarrangörer"	1972	—		Non-album single
"Dum Dum Diddle"	1976	—		Arrival
"Slipping Through My Fingers"	1981	— (Note: "Slipping Through My Fingers" did not enter the UK Singles Chart, but peaked at number 85 on the UK Singles Sales Chart and number 76 on the UK Singles Downloads Chart.)	BPI: Silver; RMNZ: Gold	The Visitors
"Should I Laugh or Cry"	1984	—		Love Songs – A Very Special Collection
"Dream World"	1994	—		Thank You for the Music (Box set)
"Put on Your White Sombrero"	1994	—		Thank You for the Music (Box set)
"Our Last Summer"	1998	—		Love Stories
"The Way Old Friends Do"	2003	—		Super Trouper

=== Private releases ===
List of private releases
Title	Year
"Sång till Görel"	1979
"Hovas vittne"	1981

== Other charted songs ==
List of other charted songs, with selected chart positions, showing year released and originating album
Title	Year	Peak chart positions								Album
Title	Year	SWE	SWE Svensk.	IRE	JPN OS	NLD	NZ Hot	SPA Radio	UK	Album
"Åh, vilka tider"	1973	—	6	—	—	—	—	—	—	
"Watch Out"	1974	—	—	—	—	—	—	1	—	Waterloo
"Tropical Loveland"	1975	—	—	—	—	—	—	9	—	ABBA
"Intermezzo No. 1"	1976	—	—	—	—	—	—	15	—	ABBA
"I Wonder (Departure)"	1977	—	—	—	—	—	—	7	—	ABBA: The Album
"I'm a Marionette"	1978	—	—	—	—	—	—	8	—	ABBA: The Album
"Pick a Bale of Cotton" / "On Top of Old Smokey" / "Midnight Special" (Medley)	1978	—	—	—	—	—	—	28	—	Non-album single
"Lovelight"	1979	—	—	—	—	—	—	1	—	Non-album single
"Kisses of Fire"	1979	—	—	—	—	—	—	4	—	Voulez-Vous
"The King Has Lost His Crown"	1980	—	—	—	—	—	—	28	—	Voulez-Vous
"Elaine"	1980	—	—	—	—	—	—	12	—	Non-album single
"The Piper"	1981	—	—	—	—	—	—	5	—	Super Trouper
"Cassandra"	1982	—	—	—	—	—	—	29	—	Non-album single
"The Spanish Gold Medley"	1992	—	—	—	—	—	—	2	—	Non-album single
"When You Danced with Me"	2021	8	5	43	11	67	27	—	67	Voyage
"I Can Be That Woman"	2021	23	—	—	—	—	—	—	— (Note: "I Can Be That Woman" did not enter the UK Singles Chart, but peaked at number 48 on the UK Singles Downloads Chart.)	Voyage
"Keep an Eye on Dan"	2021	19	—	—	—	—	—	—	— (Note: "Keep an Eye on Dan" did not enter the UK Singles Chart, but peaked at number 88 on the UK Singles Downloads Chart.)	Voyage
"Bumblebee"	2021	25	—	—	—	—	—	—	— (Note: "Bumblebee" did not enter the UK Singles Chart, but peaked at number 85 on the UK Singles Downloads Chart.)	Voyage
"Ode to Freedom"	2021	30	—	—	—	—	—	—	— (Note: "Ode to Freedom" did not enter the UK Singles Chart, but peaked at number 81 on the UK Singles Downloads Chart.)	Voyage
"—" denotes song that did not chart or was not released

== Videography ==
=== Video albums ===
List of video albums, their format and certifications
Year	Title	Format	Certifications
1980	ABBA	LaserDisc (MCA DiscoVision)	
1992	ABBA Gold	VHS, Video CD, LaserDisc	
1993	More ABBA Gold: More ABBA Hits	VHS, Video CD, LaserDisc	
1994	Thank You ABBA	VHS, Video CD	
1999	ABBA The Winner Takes It All	VHS, Video CD, DVD	
2002	ABBA: The Ultimate Review	DVD	
2002	ABBA The Definitive Collection	2 CD/DVD box-set, Video CD, DVD	ARIA: 3× Platinum; BPI: Platinum
2003	ABBA Gold	DVD	ARIA: 3× Platinum
2004	ABBA in Concert	Video CD, DVD, LaserDisc (Note: The LaserDisc version was released in 1990 without the bonus material.)	GLF: Gold; ARIA: Gold
2004	ABBA: The Last Video	DVD	
2004	ABBA Super Troupers	DVD	
2005	ABBA The Movie	DVD, HD-DVD, Blu-ray	GLF: Gold
2006	ABBA Number Ones	Video CD, DVD	ARIA: Platinum
2006	ABBA 16 Hits	Video CD, DVD	ARIA: 2× Platinum
2009	ABBA in Japan	Single DVD/Double DVD Special Edition	
2012	ABBA The Essential Collection	2 CD/DVD	

=== Music videos ===
“Film clips” showing groups performing their songs had been used to great effect by major artists like The Beatles since the mid-Sixties as a convenience for those who were reluctant or unable to tour or make appearances abroad. In the summer of 1974, when there was a demand for the group's presence in the United States, they hired the director Lasse Hallström to direct the group's first film clips, for "Waterloo" and "Ring Ring". Hallström had been making pop film clips for television since the late Sixties, and had recently directed a sequence of successful short comedy skits for Swedish television. The videos were successful, and the following year the group rehired him to make four promo clips of the songs they felt had the strongest hit potential on the new album ("I Do, I Do, I Do, I Do, I Do", "Mamma Mia", "SOS" and "Bang-A-Boomerang"). Hallström would go on to make most of their in-house promotional clips, often on a very small budget (the four 1975 films were completed in two days, at a total cost of less than 50,000 kronor (£5,500), and Hallström did the editing work himself from his apartment). The relationship ended in 1982, prompted by changing tastes and demands and complaints from ABBA's distributors that Hallström's low-budget approach made it difficult to market the band. Director Kjell Sundvall and cinematographer Kjell-Åke Andersson, an up-and-coming filmmaker team, were hired to replace them for the final two promotional videos, "The Day Before You Came" and "Under Attack".

List of music videos, showing year released, title, director, originating album, and some notes
Year	Title	Director	Album
1974	"Waterloo"	Lasse Hallström	Waterloo
1974	"Ring Ring"	Lasse Hallström	Ring Ring
1975	"Mamma Mia"	Lasse Hallström	ABBA
1975	"SOS"	Lasse Hallström	ABBA
1975	"Bang-A-Boomerang"	Lasse Hallström	ABBA
1975	"I Do, I Do, I Do, I Do, I Do"	Lasse Hallström	ABBA
1976	"Fernando"	Lasse Hallström	Greatest Hits
1976	"Dancing Queen"	Lasse Hallström	Arrival
1976	"When I Kissed the Teacher"	Per Falkman (SVT crew)	Arrival
1976	"Money, Money, Money"	Lasse Hallström	Arrival
1977	"Knowing Me, Knowing You"	Lasse Hallström	Arrival
1977	"That's Me"	Lasse Hallström	Arrival
1977	"The Name of the Game"	Lasse Hallström	The Album
1978	"Take a Chance on Me"	Lasse Hallström	The Album
1978	"Eagle"	Lasse Hallström	The Album
1978	"One Man, One Woman"	Lasse Hallström	The Album
1978	"Thank You for the Music"	Lasse Hallström	The Album
1978	"Summer Night City"	Lasse Hallström	Non-album single
1979	"Chiquitita"	BBC crew	Voulez-Vous
1979	"Does Your Mother Know"	Lasse Hallström	Voulez-Vous
1979	"Voulez-Vous"	Lasse Hallström	Voulez-Vous
1979	"Gimme! Gimme! Gimme! (A Man After Midnight)"	Lasse Hallström	Greatest Hits Vol. 2
1979	"Estoy Soñando"	Lasse Hallström	Oro: Grandes Éxitos
1979	"I Have a Dream"	Urban Lasson	Voulez-Vous
1980	"Conociéndome, Conociéndote"	Lasse Hallström	Oro: Grandes Éxitos
1980	"Gracias por la Música"	Lasse Hallström	Oro: Grandes Éxitos
1980	"On and On and On"	Anders Hanser (photo montage)	Super Trouper
1980	"The Winner Takes It All"	Lasse Hallström	Super Trouper
1980	"Super Trouper"	Lasse Hallström	Super Trouper
1980	"Happy New Year"	Lasse Hallström	Super Trouper
1980	"Felicidad"	Lasse Hallström	Oro: Grandes Éxitos
1981	"Lay All Your Love on Me"	video collage	Super Trouper
1981	"When All Is Said and Done"	Lasse Hallström	The Visitors
1981	"One of Us"	Lasse Hallström	The Visitors
1981	"No Hay a Quien Culpar"	Lasse Hallström	Oro: Grandes Éxitos
1982	"Head over Heels"	Lasse Hallström	The Visitors
1982	"The Day Before You Came"	Kjell Sundvall and Kjell-Åke Andersson	The Singles: The First Ten Years
1982	"Under Attack"	Kjell Sundvall and Kjell-Åke Andersson	The Singles: The First Ten Years
2004	"The Last Video"	Radical Media UK	Non-album video
2021	"I Still Have Faith in You"	Shynola	Voyage
2021	"Little Things"	Sophie Muller	Voyage

== See also ==
- Agnetha Fältskog discography
- Anni-Frid Lyngstad discography
- Benny Andersson discography
- Björn Ulvaeus § Discography
- Mamma Mia! (musical)
- Mamma Mia! (film)
- Mamma Mia! The Movie Soundtrack
- List of songs recorded by ABBA
- List of unreleased songs recorded by ABBA
- List of best-selling music artists
- List of best-selling albums
- List of best-selling singles by country

== Footnotes ==
Notes for albums and songs

Notes for peak chart positions
