= The Definitive Collection (ABBA album) =

2001 compilation album by ABBA

Compilation album by ABBA
- Released: 2 November 2001
- Recorded: 1972–1982
- Studio: Metronome Studios, Stockholm; Polar Studios, Stockholm; Criteria Studios, Miami; Europafilm Studios, Stockholm; KMH Studios, Stockholm; Marcus Studios, Stockholm; Bohus Studio, Kungälv,
- Genre: Pop
- Length: 147:38
- Label: Universal Music Group
- Producer: Benny Andersson, Björn Ulvaeus

ABBA chronology
| 20th Century Masters – The Millennium Collection: The Best of ABBA (2000) | The Definitive Collection (2001) | The Name of the Game (2002) |

Professional ratings
Review scores
| Source | Rating |
|---|---|
| Allmusic | 5/5 stars |
| The Encyclopedia of Popular Music | 4/5 stars |
| The Rolling Stone Album Guide | 4/5 stars |

The Definitive Collection is a 2001 compilation album of all the singles released by Swedish pop group ABBA. It consisted of two discs: the first featuring the singles from 1972 to 1979 ("People Need Love" to "Does Your Mother Know"), and the second including the singles from 1979 to 1982 ("Voulez-Vous" to "Under Attack"), with the tracks being listed in chronological order. The main exception is the track "Thank You for the Music", which, despite being written and recorded in 1977, was in fact released as a single (primarily in the UK) in 1983 after the band had split up. It appears on disc two, along with two bonus tracks, "Ring Ring" (1974 UK single remix), and "Voulez-Vous" (1979 US promo extended remix). The Australian version of The Definitive Collection adds a further two bonus tracks: "Rock Me" and "Hasta Mañana". The 1974 remix of "Ring Ring" is the first appearance on CD of this version mastered from the original master tape, after the UK single master tapes had been returned to Polar Music by the former UK licensees, Epic Records. The track's previous appearance on CD, in a 1999 singles boxed set, was mastered from a vinyl single.

The Definitive Collection is the only ABBA compilation to include all the UK single releases from 1973 to 1983. The four "unofficial" UK ABBA singles are included, these being the 1974 remix of "Ring Ring", "Angeleyes", "Lay All Your Love on Me" and "Thank You for the Music". An "unofficial single" is one that was not released by ABBA's record label, Polar Music, in any Scandinavian country. A VHS (has been long out of print ever since), and a DVD (available on all regions with both PAL and NTSC color mode), also called The Definitive Collection were released in 2002, and features all of ABBA's videos, as well as five bonus videos and a picture gallery. In the US the 2-CD set was bundled with the DVD.

In 2003, the album was ranked number 179 on Rolling Stone magazine's list of the 500 greatest albums of all time, maintaining the rating in a 2012 revised list, and coming in at number 303 in the 2020 edition.

The Essential Collection, an album with a similar track listing but with different artwork and mastering, was released in 2012.

== Track listing ==
All songs which are written by Benny Andersson and Björn Ulvaeus unless otherwise noted. Tracks 1–4 were originally released under the name "Björn & Benny, Agnetha & Anni-Frid".

=== Disc one ===
| No. | Title | Album of Origin | Length |
|---|---|---|---|
| 1. | "People Need Love" | Ring Ring (1973); first released as a single the previous year | 2:45 |
| 2. | "He Is Your Brother" | Ring Ring; first released as a single the previous year | 3:18 |
| 3. | "Ring Ring" (Andersson, Stig Anderson, Ulvaeus, Neil Sedaka, Phil Cody) | Ring Ring | 3:04 |
| 4. | "Love Isn't Easy (But It Sure Is Hard Enough)" | Ring Ring | 2:53 |
| 5. | "Waterloo" (Andersson, Anderson, Ulvaeus) | Waterloo (1974) | 2:47 |
| 6. | "Honey, Honey" (Andersson, Anderson, Ulvaeus) | Waterloo | 2:55 |
| 7. | "So Long" | ABBA (1975); released as a single the previous year | 3:05 |
| 8. | "I Do, I Do, I Do, I Do, I Do" (Andersson, Anderson, Ulvaeus) | ABBA | 3:16 |
| 9. | "SOS" (Andersson, Anderson, Ulvaeus) | ABBA | 3:20 |
| 10. | "Mamma Mia" (Andersson, Anderson, Ulvaeus) | ABBA | 3:32 |
| 11. | "Fernando" | Non-album single; subsequently included on later releases of Greatest Hits (1975) | 4:14 |
| 12. | "Dancing Queen" (Andersson, Anderson, Ulvaeus) | Arrival (1976) | 3:51 |
| 13. | "Money, Money, Money" | Arrival | 3:05 |
| 14. | "Knowing Me, Knowing You" (Andersson, Anderson, Ulvaeus) | Arrival; released as a single the following year | 4:01 |
| 15. | "The Name of the Game" (Andersson, Anderson, Ulvaeus) | ABBA: The Album (1977) | 4:52 |
| 16. | "Take a Chance on Me" | ABBA: The Album | 4:05 |
| 17. | "Eagle" (1999 edited version) | ABBA: The Album; released as a single the following year | 4:27 |
| 18. | "Summer Night City" | Non-album single; later included on Greatest Hits Vol. 2 (1979) | 3:35 |
| 19. | "Chiquitita" | Voulez-Vous (1979) | 5:24 |
| 20. | "Does Your Mother Know" | Voulez-Vous | 3:13 |
| 21. | "Rock Me" (Australian bonus track) | ABBA (1975); released as a single the following year | 3:08 |
| 22. | "Hasta Mañana" (Andersson, Anderson, Ulvaeus; Australian bonus track) | Waterloo | 3:11 |

=== Disc two ===
| No. | Title | Album of Origin | Length |
|---|---|---|---|
| 1. | "Voulez-Vous" | Voulez-Vous | 5:08 |
| 2. | "Angeleyes" | Voulez-Vous | 4:19 |
| 3. | "Gimme! Gimme! Gimme! (A Man After Midnight)" | Greatest Hits Vol. 2 (1979) | 4:50 |
| 4. | "I Have a Dream" | Voulez-Vous | 4:42 |
| 5. | "The Winner Takes It All" | Super Trouper (1980) | 4:56 |
| 6. | "Super Trouper" | Super Trouper | 4:13 |
| 7. | "On and On and On" | Super Trouper | 3:42 |
| 8. | "Lay All Your Love on Me" | Super Trouper | 4:34 |
| 9. | "One of Us" | The Visitors (1981) | 3:56 |
| 10. | "When All Is Said and Done" | The Visitors | 3:17 |
| 11. | "Head over Heels" | The Visitors | 3:47 |
| 12. | "The Visitors (Crackin' Up)" | The Visitors | 5:46 |
| 13. | "The Day Before You Came" | The Singles: The First Ten Years (1982) | 5:51 |
| 14. | "Under Attack" | The Singles: The First Ten Years | 3:47 |
| 15. | "Thank You for the Music" | ABBA: The Album (1977); released as a single in support of Thank You for the Music (1983) | 3:51 |
| 16. | "Ring Ring" (1974 UK single remix; Andersson, Anderson, Ulvaeus, Sedaka, Cody; bonus track) | Previously unreleased on CD (2001) | 3:10 |
| 17. | "Voulez-Vous" (1979 US promo extended remix; bonus track) | Previously unreleased on CD | 6:07 |

=== VHS / DVD ===
| No. | Title | Length |
|---|---|---|
| 1. | "Waterloo" | 2:47 |
| 2. | "Ring Ring" | 3:04 |
| 3. | "Mamma Mia" | 3:32 |
| 4. | "SOS" | 3:20 |
| 5. | "Bang-A-Boomerang" | 2:50 |
| 6. | "I Do, I Do, I Do, I Do, I Do" | 3:16 |
| 7. | "Fernando" | 4:14 |
| 8. | "Dancing Queen" | 3:51 |
| 9. | "Money, Money, Money" | 3:05 |
| 10. | "Knowing Me, Knowing You" | 4:01 |
| 11. | "That's Me" | 3:16 |
| 12. | "The Name of the Game" | 4:52 |
| 13. | "Take a Chance on Me" | 4:05 |
| 14. | "Eagle" | 4:27 |
| 15. | "One Man, One Woman" | 4:37 |
| 16. | "Thank You for the Music" | 3:51 |
| 17. | "Summer Night City" | 3:35 |
| 18. | "Chiquitita" | 5:24 |
| 19. | "Does Your Mother Know" | 3:13 |
| 20. | "Voulez-Vous" | 5:08 |
| 21. | "Gimme! Gimme! Gimme! (A Man After Midnight)" | 4:50 |
| 22. | "On and On and On" | 3:42 |
| 23. | "The Winner Takes It All" | 4:56 |
| 24. | "Super Trouper" | 4:13 |
| 25. | "Happy New Year" | 4:23 |
| 26. | "When All Is Said and Done" | 3:17 |
| 27. | "One of Us" | 3:56 |
| 28. | "Head over Heels" | 3:47 |
| 29. | "The Day Before You Came" | 5:51 |
| 30. | "Under Attack" | 3:47 |
| 31. | "When I Kissed the Teacher" | 3:01 |
| 32. | "Estoy soñando" ("I Have a Dream") | 4:45 |
| 33. | "Felicidad" ("Happy New Year") | 4:23 |
| 34. | "No hay a quien culpar" ("When All Is Said and Done") | 3:17 |
| 35. | "Dancing Queen" (Live at the Royal Swedish Opera, Stockholm, Sweden) |

== Personnel ==
- Agnetha Fältskog – lead vocals (9, 16, 19, 22, 25, 27, 30–31, 33, 35–37), co-lead vocals (1–8, 10, 12, 15, 17, 18, 20–21, 23–24, 29, 38–39), backing vocals
- Anni-Frid Lyngstad – lead vocals (11, 13–14, 26, 28, 32, 34), co-lead vocals (1–8, 10, 12, 15, 17–18, 20–21, 23–24, 29, 38–39), backing vocals
- Björn Ulvaeus – lead vocals (18, 20–21), co-lead vocals (1–2, 4) acoustic guitar, backing vocals
- Benny Andersson – synthesizer, keyboards, backing vocals

== Charts ==
=== Weekly charts ===
| Chart (2001) | Peak position |
|---|---|
| Austrian Albums (Ö3 Austria) | 38 |
| Belgian Albums (Ultratop Flanders) | 29 |
| Irish Albums (IRMA) | 33 |
| Italian Albums (FIMI) | 10 |
| UK Albums (OCC) | 17 |

| Chart (2002) | Peak position |
|---|---|
| Australian Albums (ARIA) | 10 |
| New Zealand Albums (RMNZ) | 9 |

| Chart (2003) | Peak position |
|---|---|
| Dutch Albums (Album Top 100) | 39 |

| Chart (2004) | Peak position |
|---|---|
| Danish Albums (Hitlisten) | 3 |
| Norwegian Albums (VG-lista) | 8 |
| Singaporean Albums (RIAS) | 4 |
| Swedish Albums (Sverigetopplistan) | 26 |
| Swiss Albums (Schweizer Hitparade) | 34 |

| Chart (2010) | Peak position |
|---|---|
| Finnish Albums (Suomen virallinen lista) | 28 |

| Chart (2011) | Peak position |
|---|---|
| French Albums (SNEP) | 35 |

== Certifications and sales ==
| Region | Certification | Certified units/sales |
|---|---|---|
| Australia (ARIA) | 2× Platinum | 140,000^{^} |
| Australia (ARIA) video | 3× Platinum | 45,000^{^} |
| Brazil (Pro-Música Brasil) | Gold | 50,000^{*} |
| Denmark (IFPI Danmark) | Gold | 25,000^{^} |
| France (SNEP) | Gold | 50,000^{*} |
| Germany (BVMI) | Platinum | 300,000^{^} |
| Germany (BVMI) video | 2× Platinum | 100,000^{^} |
| Mexico (AMPROFON) video | Gold | 10,000^{^} |
| Netherlands (NVPI) video | Gold | 40,000^{^} |
| New Zealand (RMNZ) | Gold | 7,500^{^} |
| South Korea | — | 134,996 |
| Switzerland (IFPI Switzerland) | Gold | 20,000^{^} |
| Sweden (GLF) | Gold | 40,000^{^} |
| United Kingdom (BPI) | Gold | 100,000^{*} |
| United Kingdom (BPI) video | Platinum | 50,000^{*} |
| United States | — | 342,000 |
^{*} Sales figures based on certification alone.^{^} Shipments figures based on certification alone.
