= The Essential Collection (ABBA album) =

Compilation album by ABBA
- Released: 2012
- Recorded: 29 March 1972 – 26 August 1982
- Genre: Pop; synth-pop; dance-pop; disco; pop rock; Europop
- Length: 154:56
- Label: Polar Music International
- Producer: Benny Andersson, Björn Ulvaeus

ABBA chronology
ABBA Icon (2010)	The Essential Collection (2012)	Live at Wembley Arena (2014)

The Essential Collection is a 2012 compilation album released by Swedish pop group ABBA, collecting all single A-sides as originally planned and conceived by their record company, Polar Music, in addition to a few songs that were single hits in significant markets, as well as album tracks for which music videos were made. A two-CD set, the first disc spans 1972 to 1978 ("People Need Love" to "Summer Night City"), while the second covers 1979 to 1982 ("Chiquitita" to "Under Attack").

The Essential Collection effectively supersedes 2001's The Definitive Collection, retaining all but two tracks from the earlier release (eliminating the "Ring Ring" and "Voulez-Vous" remixes) and adding four others ("Bang-A-Boomerang", "That's Me", "One Man, One Woman" and "Happy New Year"). The sequencing is chronological, with "Thank You for the Music" moved from the second disc to the first. Unlike its predecessor, The Essential Collection does not feature regional bonus tracks.

The Essential Collection was also released in DVD format. It features every official ABBA music video plus five Spanish-language clips, two of which ("Conociéndome, conociéndote" and "Gracias por la música") did not appear on The Definitive Collection. It also includes the 2004 short film The Last Video.

The collection was released as a two-CD set, a DVD, and a three-disc set including the DVD and both CDs.

It was awarded a gold disc for 100,000 sales in Germany.

== Track listing ==
All songs are written by Benny Andersson and Björn Ulvaeus unless otherwise noted. Tracks 1–4 were originally released under the name "Björn & Benny, Agnetha & Anni-Frid".

=== Disc one ===
No.	Title	Writer(s)	Original album	Length
1.	"People Need Love"		Ring Ring (1973); first released as a single the previous year	2:48
2.	"He Is Your Brother"		Ring Ring; first released as a single the previous year	3:21
3.	"Ring Ring"	Andersson; Stig Anderson; Ulvaeus; Neil Sedaka; Phil Cody	Ring Ring	3:06
4.	"Love Isn't Easy (But It Sure Is Hard Enough)"		Ring Ring	2:55
5.	"Waterloo"	Andersson; Anderson; Ulvaeus	Waterloo (1974)	2:46
6.	"Honey, Honey"	Andersson; Anderson; Ulvaeus	Waterloo	2:56
7.	"So Long"		ABBA (1975); released as a single the previous year	3:07
8.	"I Do, I Do, I Do, I Do, I Do"	Andersson; Anderson; Ulvaeus	ABBA	3:18
9.	"SOS"	Andersson; Anderson; Ulvaeus	ABBA	3:23
10.	"Mamma Mia"	Andersson; Anderson; Ulvaeus	ABBA	3:34
11.	"Bang-A-Boomerang"	Andersson; Anderson; Ulvaeus	ABBA	3:05
12.	"Fernando"		non-album single (1976); subsequently included on later releases of Greatest Hits (1975)	4:15
13.	"Dancing Queen"	Andersson; Anderson; Ulvaeus	Arrival (1976)	3:53
14.	"Money, Money, Money"		Arrival	3:10
15.	"Knowing Me, Knowing You"	Andersson; Anderson; Ulvaeus	Arrival; released as a single the following year	4:05
16.	"That's Me"	Andersson; Anderson; Ulvaeus	Arrival; released as a single the following year	3:18
17.	"The Name of the Game"	Andersson; Anderson; Ulvaeus	ABBA: The Album (1977)	4:55
18.	"Take a Chance on Me"		ABBA: The Album	4:09
19.	"Eagle" (edited version)		ABBA: The Album; released as a single the following year	4:28
20.	"One Man, One Woman"		ABBA: The Album	4:34
21.	"Thank You for the Music"		ABBA: The Album; released as a single in support of Thank You for the Music (1983)	3:52
22.	"Summer Night City"		non-album single (1978); later included on Greatest Hits Vol. 2 (1979)	3:37
Total length:				1:18:36

=== Disc two ===
No.	Title	Original album	Length
1.	"Chiquitita"	Voulez-Vous (1979)	5:28
2.	"Does Your Mother Know"	Voulez-Vous	3:16
3.	"Voulez-Vous"	Voulez-Vous	5:10
4.	"Angeleyes"	Voulez-Vous	4:24
5.	"Gimme! Gimme! Gimme! (A Man After Midnight)"	Greatest Hits Vol. 2 (1979)	4:52
6.	"I Have a Dream"	Voulez-Vous	4:44
7.	"The Winner Takes It All"	Super Trouper (1980)	4:57
8.	"Super Trouper"	Super Trouper	4:12
9.	"On and On and On"	Super Trouper	3:41
10.	"Lay All Your Love on Me"	Super Trouper	4:36
11.	"Happy New Year"	Super Trouper	4:25
12.	"One of Us"	The Visitors (1981)	3:58
13.	"When All Is Said and Done"	The Visitors	3:20
14.	"Head over Heels"	The Visitors	3:49
15.	"The Visitors"	The Visitors	5:47
16.	"The Day Before You Came"	The Singles: The First Ten Years (1982)	5:50
17.	"Under Attack"	The Singles: The First Ten Years	3:50
Total length:			1:16:20

=== DVD ===
No.	Title	Length
1.	"Waterloo"
2.	"Ring Ring"
3.	"Mamma Mia"
4.	"SOS"
5.	"Bang-A-Boomerang"
6.	"I Do, I Do, I Do, I Do, I Do"
7.	"Fernando"
8.	"Dancing Queen"
9.	"Money, Money, Money"
10.	"Knowing Me, Knowing You"
11.	"That's Me"
12.	"The Name of the Game"
13.	"Take a Chance on Me"
14.	"Eagle"
15.	"One Man, One Woman"
16.	"Thank You for the Music"
17.	"Summer Night City"
18.	"Chiquitita"
19.	"Does Your Mother Know"
20.	"Voulez-Vous"
21.	"Gimme! Gimme! Gimme! (A Man After Midnight)"
22.	"On and On and On"
23.	"The Winner Takes It All"
24.	"Super Trouper"
25.	"Happy New Year"
26.	"When All Is Said and Done"
27.	"One of Us"
28.	"Head over Heels"
29.	"The Day Before You Came"
30.	"Under Attack"
31.	"Estoy soñando" ("I Have a Dream")
32.	"Conociéndome, conociéndote" ("Knowing Me, Knowing You")
33.	"Gracias por la música" ("Thank You for the Music")
34.	"Felicidad" ("Happy New Year")
35.	"No hay a quién culpar" ("When All Is Said and Done")
36.	"The Last Video"
