= Love Stories (ABBA album) =

Compilation album by ABBA
- Released: 26 October 1998
- Genre: Pop
- Length: 77 minutes
- Label: PolyGram
- Producer: Björn Ulvaeus; Benny Andersson

ABBA chronology
Thank You for the Music (1994)	Love Stories (1998)	20th Century Masters – The Millennium Collection: The Best of ABBA (2001)

Professional ratings
Review scores
Source	Rating
AllMusic	2.5/5 stars
The Encyclopedia of Popular Music	3/5 stars

Love Stories is a compilation album by Swedish pop group ABBA.

== Track listing ==
No.	Title	Original album	Length
1.	"Fernando"	Greatest Hits, 1975	4:14
2.	"The Name of the Game"	ABBA: The Album, 1977	4:52
3.	"Chiquitita"	Voulez-Vous, 1979	5:26
4.	"The Winner Takes It All"	Super Trouper, 1980	4:57
5.	"I Have a Dream"	Voulez-Vous, 1979	4:45
6.	"The Day Before You Came"	The Singles: The First Ten Years, 1982	5:51
7.	"One of Us"	The Visitors, 1981	3:57
8.	"Andante, Andante"	Super Trouper, 1980	4:40
9.	"One Man, One Woman"	ABBA: The Album, 1977	4:35
10.	"Eagle"	ABBA: The Album, 1977	5:51
11.	"Slipping Through My Fingers"	The Visitors, 1981	3:52
12.	"My Love, My Life"	Arrival, 1976	3:53
13.	"Our Last Summer"	Super Trouper, 1980	4:21
14.	"Like an Angel Passing Through My Room"	The Visitors, 1981	3:25
15.	"I Wonder (Departure)"	ABBA: The Album, 1977	4:31
16.	"I Let the Music Speak"	The Visitors, 1981	5:20
17.	"The Way Old Friends Do" (recorded live at the Wembley Arena in November 1979)	The Visitors, 1981	2:57

== Charts ==
Chart (1998–99)	Peak position
Austrian Albums (Ö3 Austria)	14
Belgian Albums (Ultratop Flanders)	34
Belgian Albums (Ultratop Wallonia)	36
Finnish Albums (Suomen virallinen lista)	23
German Albums (Offizielle Top 100)	82
Norwegian Albums (VG-lista)	30
New Zealand Albums (RMNZ)	24
Scottish Albums (OCC)	69
UK Albums (OCC)	51
UK Physical Albums (OCC)	51
