= 18 Hits =

ABBA 18 Hits

Greatest hits album by ABBA
- Released: 8 September 2005
- Recorded: 1973–1980
- Genre: Pop
- Length: 68:55
- Label: Polar Music International
- Producers: Benny Andersson; Björn Ulvaeus

ABBA chronology
The Name of the Game (2002)	ABBA 18 Hits (2005)	The Complete Studio Recordings (2005)

Professional ratings
Review scores
Source	Rating
AllMusic	3.5/5 stars

ABBA 18 Hits is a compilation of hits by ABBA, released by Polar Music International on 8 September 2005.

The 18 Hits set was released as a mid-price alternative to the best-selling full-price collection ABBA Gold: Greatest Hits and features 14 of the group's biggest hits and concludes with four non-English versions: "Honey Honey" (Swedish version), "Waterloo" (French version), "Ring Ring" (German version) and the Spanish version of "Gimme! Gimme! Gimme! (A Man After Midnight)", entitled "Dame! Dame! Dame!". Among the more notable omissions on the 18 Hits collection are one of the band's biggest hits, "Dancing Queen", as well as "Chiquitita", "Take a Chance on Me" and "I Have a Dream".

The Swedish edition of 18 Hits, also released in 2005, featured four Swedish language recordings instead of the four non-English versions: "Waterloo", "Honey Honey", "Ring Ring (Bara Du Slog En Signal)" and "Åh Vilka Tider". This is the first ABBA CD to include "Åh Vilka Tider", which had originally been released as the B-side to the Swedish version of "Ring Ring". It would also appear worldwide on The Complete Studio Recordings. A budget-priced DVD entitled 16 Hits was released simultaneously.

While numerous other similar hits compilations with the group have been released both before and since, 18 Hits has proved to be one of Universal Music's bestselling ABBA products, peaking in the Top 10 in Poland and the Top 20 in the UK, Spain and Hungary and re-entering the charts in many territories after the premiere of movie Mamma Mia! in the summer of 2008. It never included any songs from The Visitors or any other songs released from 1981 to 1982.

This compilation is not available digitally, as many tracks, featured in this compilation, are part of other ABBA compilations available in digital distribution. It is, eventually, still repressed on CD for many regions of the world.

== Track listing ==
All tracks are written by Benny Andersson and Björn Ulvaeus unless otherwise noted.

No.	Title	Writer(s)	Length
1.	"The Winner Takes It All"		4:56
2.	"Super Trouper"		4:14
3.	"Waterloo"	Andersson, Stig Anderson, Ulvaeus	2:47
4.	"Gimme! Gimme! Gimme! (A Man After Midnight)"		4:51
5.	"The Name of the Game"	Andersson, Anderson, Ulvaeus	4:52
6.	"Ring Ring"	Andersson, Anderson, Ulvaeus, Neil Sedaka, Phil Cody	3:04
7.	"I Do, I Do, I Do, I Do, I Do"	Andersson, Anderson, Ulvaeus	3:17
8.	"SOS"	Andersson, Anderson, Ulvaeus	3:21
9.	"Fernando"	Andersson, Anderson, Ulvaeus	4:13
10.	"Hasta Mañana"	Andersson, Anderson, Ulvaeus	3:08
11.	"Mamma Mia"	Andersson, Anderson, Ulvaeus	3:33
12.	"Lay All Your Love on Me"		4:36
13.	"Thank You for the Music"		3:50
14.	"Happy New Year"		4:24
15.	"Honey Honey (Swedish Version)"	Andersson, Anderson, Ulvaeus	2:58
16.	"Waterloo (French Version)"	Andersson, Anderson, Ulvaeus	2:41
17.	"Ring Ring (German Version)"	Andersson, Anderson, Ulvaeus, Sedaka, Cody	3:10
18.	"Dame! Dame! Dame!" (Spanish version of "Gimme! Gimme! Gimme! (A Man After Midnight)")		4:52

== Personnel ==
- Agnetha Fältskog – lead vocals (1, 4, 8, 10, 12, 13–14, 18), co-lead vocals (3, 5, 6–7, 11, 15–17), backing vocals
- Anni-Frid Lyngstad – lead vocals (2, 9), co-lead vocals (3, 5–7, 11, 15–17), backing vocals
- Björn Ulvaeus – acoustic guitar, backing vocals
- Benny Andersson – synthesizer, keyboards, backing vocals

== Charts ==
=== Weekly charts ===
Chart (2006)	Peak position
Australian Albums (ARIA)	32
Belgian Mid Price (Ultratop Wallonia)	1

Chart (2007)	Peak position
Spanish Albums (Promusicae)	17

Chart (2008)	Peak position
Danish Albums (Hitlisten)	39
Hungarian Albums (MAHASZ)	19
Irish Albums (IRMA)	7
UK Albums (Official Charts)	15

Chart (2012)	Peak position
French Albums (SNEP)	82

Chart (2017)	Peak position
Polish Albums (ZPAV)	1

Chart (2018)	Peak position
Portuguese Albums (AFP)	15

=== Year-end charts ===
Chart (2012)	Position
UK Albums (OCC)	183
Chart (2013)	Position
UK Albums (OCC)	128
Chart (2018)	Position
Polish Albums (ZPAV)	45

== Certifications ==
Region	Certification	Certified units/sales
Australia (ARIA)	4× Platinum	280,000^{^}
Belgium (BRMA)	Platinum	50,000^{*}
Brazil (Pro-Música Brasil)	Platinum	125,000^{*}
Germany (BVMI)	2× Platinum	400,000^{‡}
Poland (ZPAV)	2× Platinum	40,000^{‡}
Russia (NFPF)	2× Platinum	40,000^{*}
United Kingdom (BPI)	Platinum	300,000^{^}
Summaries
Europe (IFPI)	Platinum	1,000,000^{*}
^{*} Sales figures based on certification alone.^{^} Shipments figures based on certification alone.^{‡} Sales+streaming figures based on certification alone.
