= Name of the Game =

Name of the Game may refer to:

== Television ==
- The Name of the Game (TV series), a 1968–1971 American drama
  - Fame Is the Name of the Game, a 1966 American television film and pilot for the series
- "The Name of the Game" (Grey's Anatomy), a television episode
- "The Name of the Game" (The Boys episode), a television episode
- "The Game of the Name", an episode of Yanks Go Home, a pun on the phrase The Name of the Game

== Music ==
=== Albums ===
- Name of the Game, a 2008 album by Boo Boo Davis
- The Name of the Game (album), a 2002 compilation album by ABBA

=== Songs ===
- "The Name of the Game" (ABBA song), 1977
- "Name of the Game" (The Crystal Method song), 2001
- "Name of the Game" (Badfinger song), 1971
- "Name of the Game", a 1980 song by Status Quo from Just Supposin'
- "Name of the Game", a 1986 song by Cheap Trick, B-side of "It's Only Love"
- "Olé, Olé, Olé (The Name of the Game)", a 1987 song by The Fans

== Literature ==
- The Name of the Game, a 1988 Forgotten Realms novel by Rose Estes
- The Name of the Game, a 2003 comic by Will Eisner

== See also ==
- "The Name Game", a children's singalong rhyming game
- The Name of the Game Is Kill!, a 1968 American film
- "The Name of the Game Was Love", a single by Hank Snow
