= I'm a Marionette =

Song by ABBA

from the album The Album
- A-side: "Take a Chance on Me"
- Released: 14 January 1978
- Genre: Progressive rock; art rock; Europop
- Length: 3:54
- Label: Polar Music
- Songwriters: Benny Andersson & Björn Ulvaeus
- Producers: Benny Andersson & Björn Ulvaeus

Audio video
- "I'm A Marionette" on YouTube

"I'm a Marionette" is a song recorded by the Swedish pop group ABBA from their fifth album, ABBA: The Album. Written by Björn Ulvaeus and Benny Andersson, the song was originally part of a mini-musical called The Girl with the Golden Hair that ABBA performed on the 1977 concert tours of Europe and Australia. The other songs in the "mini-musical" were "Thank You for the Music", "I Wonder (Departure)" and "Get on the Carousel". With the exception of the last track, studio versions of these appeared on the 1977 ABBA album. "I'm a Marionette" was the B-side of "Take a Chance on Me", when it was released as a single. The live version of the song can be found on ABBA: the Movie

The song was covered by fellow Swedish band Ghost, as part of their 2013 EP If You Have Ghost.
