= Euphoria (Claire Richards album) =

Studio album by Claire Richards
- Released: 25 August 2023
- Genre: Pop
- Length: 46:56
- Label: Demon Music Group
- Producer: Steve Anderson

Claire Richards chronology
My Wildest Dreams (2019)	Euphoria (2023)

Singles from Euphoria
- 1. "I Surrender" Released: 28 June 2023; 2. "Summer Night City" Released: 26 July 2023; 3. "No More Tears (Enough Is Enough)" Released: 25 August 2023

Euphoria is the second studio album and first cover album by English singer-songwriter Claire Richards. It was released on 25 August 2023 through Demon Music Group. The album features guest appearances by Australian musician Delta Goodrem and Andy Bell.

== Background ==
Richards stated that the album is "personal" to her, trying to delve among her own roots and background for inspiration. She realised that, in order how to learn to sing, it happened through singing along to favourite artists, much of them covered on the record. She and her producer then compiled a list and picked their favourites to record. The recording process then became "the campest, possibly", quickly realising that they had put together an album with "gay anthems". As a result, the singer concluded that the record was "made for them", talking about LGBT community, and was subsequently glad to hear that they "did embrace it". One of the main influences behind the project was Swedish singer Loreen, whom she got to meet in person in June 2023. The title track and name of the album are a nod to her.

Upon release, Richards also revealed her "release day ritual", as she always goes out to buy her own albums on release day.

== Singles ==
- On 28 June 2023, Richards released the single "I Surrender" as the lead single from Euphoria.
- On 26 July 2023, Richards released "Summer Night City", which features Erasure lead singer Andy Bell.
- On 25 August 2023, "No More Tears (Enough Is Enough)" was released as the third single from the album. It features Australian singer Delta Goodrem.

== Critical reception ==
Jeremy Williams-Chalmers of The Yorkshire Times opined that the "euphoric" album is an hommage to "female vocalists who have shaped and moulded her from a musical theatre style performer into a fully fledged pop icon", describing Richards' takes on the songs as "faithfully and loyally", as well as giving them "new life and new meaning". Mary Varvaris at The Music sought out the duet with Australian singer Delta Goodrem which she thought was "a brilliant track", "bringing their combined talents" to honour the original version. Varvaris highlighted the harmonisation of the pair's vocals, describing as fit enough to pull off the "disco-pop and empowerment of the original".

== Track listing ==
All songs produced by Steve Anderson.

Euphoria track listing
No.	Title	Writer(s)	Original artist	Length
1.	"Euphoria"	Thomas G:son; Peter Boström	Loreen	3:34
2.	"Song for the Lonely"	Mark Taylor; Paul Barry; Steve Torch	Cher	3:21
3.	"No More Tears (Enough Is Enough)" (Feat. Delta Goodrem)	Paul Jabara; Bruce Roberts	Barbra Streisand and Donna Summer	5:01
4.	"So Emotional"	Billy Steinberg; Tom Kelly	Whitney Houston	3:44
5.	"I Surrender"	Louis Biancaniello; Sam Watters	Celine Dion	4:09
6.	"Summer Night City" (Feat. Andy Bell)	Benny Andersson; Björn Ulvaeus	ABBA	3:24
7.	"This Time I Know It's for Real"	Donna Summer; Matt Aitken; Mike Stock; Pete Waterman	Donna Summer	2:45
8.	"Never Trust a Stranger"	Kim Wilde; Ricki Wilde	Kim Wilde	3:40
9.	"Gloria"	Umberto Tozzi; Giancarlo Bigazzi; Trevor Veitch	Umberto Tozzi; Laura Branigan (English version)	3:16
10.	"Never Knew Love Like This Before"	James Mtume; Reggie Lucas	Stephanie Mills	4:02
11.	"Love Is a Battlefield"	Mike Chapman; Holly Knight	Pat Benatar	3:51
12.	"Xanadu"	Jeff Lynne	Olivia Newton-John and Electric Light Orchestra	3:25
13.	"Goodbye to Love"	Richard Carpenter; John Bettis	The Carpenters	2:44
Total length:				46:56

Euphoria Deluxe track listing
No.	Title	Writer(s)	Original artist	Length
14.	"I Surrender (7th Heaven Remix Edit)"	Louis Biancaniello; Sam Watters	Celine Dion	4:25
15.	"No More Tears (Enough Is Enough) (Steve Anderson Extended Disco Mix)" (Feat. Delta Goodrem)	Paul Jabara; Bruce Roberts	Barbra Streisand and Donna Summer	6:14
16.	"Never Knew Love Like This Before (Mastercuts Extended Mix)"	James Mtume; Reggie Lucas	Stephanie Mills	6:31
17.	"Song for the Lonely (7th Heaven Remix Edit)"	Mark Taylor; Paul Barry; Steve Torch	Cher	4:21
18.	"So Emotional (Le Flex Poolside Remix)"	Billy Steinberg; Tom Kelly	Whitney Houston	3:47
19.	"Euphoria (Orchestral Mix)"	Thomas G:son; Peter Boström	Loreen	3:34
Total length:				75:58

Euphoria (You & I Edition) Deluxe Digital track listing
No.	Title	Writer(s)	Original artist	Length
20.	"Euphoria (Live At Eurovision Village, Liverpool)"	Thomas G:son; Peter Boström	Loreen	3:39
21.	"I Surrender (Orchestral Mix)"	Louis Biancaniello; Sam Watters	Celine Dion	4:17
22.	"Summer Night City (Claire Solo Version)"	Benny Andersson; Björn Ulvaeus	ABBA	3:24
23.	"Never Knew Love Like This Before (Sudlow Remix)"	James Mtume; Reggie Lucas	Stephanie Mills	4:02
24.	"Song For The Lonely (Steve Anderson Extended Mix)"	Mark Taylor; Paul Barry; Steve Torch	Cher	5:52
25.	"Euphoria (7th Heaven Radio Edit)"	Thomas G:son; Peter Boström	Loreen	3:35
26.	"Summer Night City (Steve Anderson Extended Mix)" (Feat. Andy Bell)	Benny Andersson; Björn Ulvaeus	ABBA	6:01
27.	"Gloria (JRMX Radio Edit)"	Umberto Tozzi; Giancarlo Bigazzi; Trevor Veitch	Umberto Tozzi; Laura Branigan (English version)	3:40
28.	"Summer Night City (7th Heaven Radio Edit)" (Feat. Andy Bell)	Benny Andersson; Björn Ulvaeus	ABBA	3:49
29.	"Euphoria (JRMX Radio Edit)"	Thomas G:son; Peter Boström	Loreen	3:44
30.	"I Surrender (Radio Edit)"	Louis Biancaniello; Sam Watters	Celine Dion	3:30
Total length:				121:38

Euphoria (End Of Time Edition) Deluxe Digital track listing
No.	Title	Writer(s)	Original artist	Length
20.	"So Emotional (Le Flex Retro Remix)"	Billy Steinberg; Tom Kelly	Whitney Houston	3:46
21.	"Summer Night City (Trouser Enthusiasts Remix)" (Feat. Andy Bell)	Benny Andersson; Björn Ulvaeus	ABBA	8:03
22.	"Never Trust a Stranger (Shortland Remix)"	Kim Wilde; Ricki Wilde	Kim Wilde	3:37
23.	"Euphoria (7th Heaven Club Mix)"	Thomas G:son; Peter Boström	Loreen	8:37
24.	"This Time I Know It's for Real (Shortland Remix)"	Donna Summer; Matt Aitken; Mike Stock; Pete Waterman	Donna Summer	3:12
25.	"No More Tears (Enough Is Enough) (Sudlow Remix)" (Feat. Delta Goodrem)	Paul Jabara; Bruce Roberts	Barbra Streisand and Donna Summer	3:10
26.	"I Surrender (7th Heaven Club Mix)"	Louis Biancaniello; Sam Watters	Celine Dion	6:22
27.	"Gloria (JRMX Club Mix)"	Umberto Tozzi; Giancarlo Bigazzi; Trevor Veitch	Umberto Tozzi; Laura Branigan (English version)	6:18
28.	"Song for the Lonely (7th Heaven Club Mix)"	Mark Taylor; Paul Barry; Steve Torch	Cher	6:18
29.	"Euphoria ([JRMX Club Mix)"	Thomas G:son; Peter Boström	Loreen	5:57
30.	"Summer Night City (7Th Heaven Club Mix)" (Feat. Andy Bell)	Benny Andersson; Björn Ulvaeus	ABBA	6:33
Total length:				137:56

== Charts ==
Chart performance for Euphoria
Chart (2023)	Peak position
Belgian Albums (Ultratop Flanders)	28
Belgian Albums (Ultratop Wallonia)	17
Scottish Albums (OCC)	3
UK Albums (OCC)	2
UK Independent Albums (OCC)	1
