= 20th Century Masters – The Millennium Collection: The Best of ABBA =

Compilation album by ABBA
- Released: 26 September 2000
- Genre: Pop
- Length: 43:36
- Label: Polydor

ABBA chronology
| Love Stories (1998) | 20th Century Masters – The Millennium Collection: The Best of ABBA (2000) | The Definitive Collection (2001) |
| The Albums (2008) | ABBA Icon (2010) | The Essential Collection (2012) |

ABBA Icon
- Front cover of the 2010 ABBA Icon reissue

20th Century Masters – The Millennium Collection: The Best of ABBA is a compilation album by the Swedish pop group ABBA later reissued under the Icon series.

== Reception ==
Professional ratings
Review scores
| Source | Rating |
|---|---|
| AllMusic | 3/5 stars |
| The Vinyl DIstrict | A |
| The Rolling Stone Album Guide | 4.5/5 stars |

AllMusic reviewer Heather Phares said that the album "condenses the group's hits into an 11-song best-of-the-best compilation" and also states that the album "may please casual fans that lack the patience for Gold's 19 tracks". Stephen Thomas Erlewine reviewed the reissue, Icon, stating that it "remains an enjoyable collection of ABBA's basics"

== Track listing ==
20th Century Masters – The Millennium Collection: The Best of ABBA track listing
| No. | Title | Length |
|---|---|---|
| 1. | "Waterloo" | 2:45 |
| 2. | "SOS" | 3:23 |
| 3. | "I Do, I Do, I Do, I Do, I Do" | 3:17 |
| 4. | "Mamma Mia" | 3:34 |
| 5. | "Fernando" | 4:15 |
| 6. | "Dancing Queen" | 3:52 |
| 7. | "Knowing Me, Knowing You" | 4:03 |
| 8. | "The Name of the Game" | 4:01 |
| 9. | "Take a Chance on Me" | 4:05 |
| 10. | "Chiquitita" | 5:28 |
| 11. | "The Winner Takes It All" | 4:53 |
| Total length: | | 43:36 |

== Charts ==
=== Weekly charts ===
| Chart | Peak position | Peak reached |
|---|---|---|
| Canadian Albums (Billboard) | 20 | 2001 |
| US Billboard 200 | 189 | 2011 |
| US Top Album Sales (Billboard) | 40 | 2018 |
| US Top Catalog Albums (Billboard) | 9 | 2008 |

==== Reissue ====
| Chart | Peak position | Peak reached |
|---|---|---|
| Canadian Albums (Billboard) | 71 | 2016 |
| French Albums (SNEP) | 113 | 2016 |
| New Zealand Albums (RMNZ) | 24 | 2011 |
| Scottish Albums (OCC) | 65 | 2014 |

=== Year-end charts ===
2001 year-end chart performance for 20th Century Masters – The Millennium Collection: The Best of ABBA
| Chart (2001) | Position |
|---|---|
| Canadian Albums (Nielsen SoundScan) | 57 |

2002 Year-end chart performance for 20th Century Masters – The Millennium Collection: The Best of ABBA
| Chart (2002) | Position |
|---|---|
| Canadian Albums (Nielsen SoundScan) | 83 |

== Certifications and sales ==
Certifications for 20th Century Masters – The Millennium Collection: The Best of ABBA
| Region | Certification | Certified units/sales |
|---|---|---|
| Canada (Music Canada) | Platinum | 100,000^{^} |
| United States (RIAA) | Gold | 1,090,000 |
^{^} Shipments figures based on certification alone.

=== Reissue ===
Certifications for ABBA Icon
| Region | Certification | Certified units/sales |
|---|---|---|
| Canada (Music Canada) | Platinum | 80,000^{^} |
^{^} Shipments figures based on certification alone.
