= One Man, One Woman =

Song by ABBA

from the album The Album
- Released: 12 December 1977
- Recorded: 18 July 1977
- Studio: Marcus Music Studio
- Length: 4:33
- Label: Polar
- Songwriters: Benny Andersson & Björn Ulvaeus
- Producers: Benny Andersson & Björn Ulvaeus

Music video
- "One Man, One Woman" on YouTube

"One Man, One Woman" is a song by ABBA, released on their 1977 album ABBA: The Album. It is that album's third track after "Eagle" and "Take a Chance on Me". Composed by Benny Andersson and Björn Ulvaeus, it has appeared on several compilation albums over the years, such as 1998's Love Stories and 2012's The Essential Collection. It was first recorded on 18 July 1977, under the working title "Sjömansvisa" ("Sailor's Song").

== Synopsis ==
The song is about a couple (made up of the titular "man" and "woman") trying to save their marriage.

== Composition ==
Anni-Frid Lyngstad sang the lead vocals. The instruments used in the song are piano, synths, guitar and strings. The piano is used to add a colourful countermelody to the vocal pauses in the chorus, a similar technique to the "descending double-octave riff" used in "Dancing Queen." The synth is used in a "chord-per-bar" fashion throughout the verses, and strings take over in the chorus.

== Analysis ==
Abba: Let the Music Speak describes the song as "one of ABBA's most introspective portraits of the fragility of human relationships", adding that it is engulfed by a "genuinely fatalistic quality". It says that Frida's lead vocal is filled with "urgency and inner suffering...insecurity and self-doubt", filling the song with "unsettling realism". Both her performance and the musical progressions of the song illustrate an unsureness and lack of faith.

== Critical reception ==
The Sydney Morning Herald described the song as a "big-treatment ballad". Soon after the album was released, The Boston Globe described it as "the most striking of the new songs".
