= The Name of the Game (album) =

Compilation album by ABBA
- Released: 22 November 2002
- Genre: Pop
- Length: 59:06
- Label: Atlantic

ABBA chronology
The Definitive Collection (2001)	The Name of the Game (2002)	18 Hits (2005)

The Name of the Game is a Germany exclusive compilation album by the Swedish pop group ABBA released in 2002. The reissue of the album, titled On and On omits the tracks "Gimme! Gimme! Gimme!", "S.O.S.", "When I Kissed the Teacher" and "Ring Ring"

== Critical reception ==
Professional ratings
Review scores
Source	Rating
AllMusic	2.5/5 stars
The Encyclopedia of Popular Music	3/5 stars

James Christopher Morgan stated in a review of the album on AllMusic that it includes "16 cuts from the legendary Swedish pop group" and that the album "pales in comparison to hit-stuffed overviews like Gold, Number Ones, and Definitive Collection, especially in light of the absence of key tracks." In a review of the reissue On and On, music critic Tim Sendra states that it is a "collection of 12 ABBA songs, and that's about the entire theme that seems to be operating here" and that "Really, there is no compelling reason to buy this disc. If you are a casual fan, all you need is the Gold: Greatest Hits collection. If you are a rabid fan, you have all these tracks already. Chalk this release up to Universal's desire to milk the ABBA catalog for all it is worth."

== Track listing ==
No.	Title	Length
1.	"Waterloo"	2:47
2.	"Gimme! Gimme! Gimme! (A Man After Midnight)"	4:49
3.	"Rock Me"	3:03
4.	"Love Isn't Easy (But It Sure Is Hard Enough)"	2:54
5.	"Gonna Sing You My Love Song"	3:40
6.	"S.O.S."	3:21
7.	"When I Kissed the Teacher"	3:02
8.	"The Name of the Game"	4:54
9.	"Hole in Your Soul"	3:43
10.	"Why Did It Have to Be Me?"	3:21
11.	"On and On and On"	3:40
12.	"Lay All Your Love on Me"	4:35
13.	"The Visitors"	5:46
14.	"Kisses of Fire"	3:11
15.	"When All Is Said and Done"	3:16
16.	"Ring Ring"	3:04
Total length:		59:06

== Charts ==
Weekly chart performance for The Name of the Game
Chart (2002)	Peak position
Japanese Albums (Oricon)	126

== Certifications ==
Certifications and sales for The Name of the Game
Region	Certification	Certified units/sales
Sweden (GLF)	Platinum	60,000^{^}
United Kingdom (BPI)	Platinum	300,000^{‡}
Summaries
Europe (IFPI)	Platinum	1,000,000^{*}
^{*} Sales figures based on certification alone.^{^} Shipments figures based on certification alone.^{‡} Sales+streaming figures based on certification alone.
