= Summer Night City =

Single by ABBA

from the album Greatest Hits Vol. 2
- B-side: "Medley (4:22)"
- Released: 6 September 1978 (Sweden)
- Recorded: 1978
- Genre: Europop; disco
- Length: 3:34 (single edit); 4:14 (with original intro)
- Label: Polar
- Songwriters: Benny Andersson; Björn Ulvaeus
- Producers: Benny Andersson; Björn Ulvaeus

ABBA singles chronology
"Eagle" / "Thank You for the Music" (1978)	"Summer Night City" (1978)	"Chiquitita" (1979)
"Thank You for the Music" (1992)	"Summer Night City" (1993)	"Happy New Year" (1999)

Music video
- "Summer Night City" on YouTube

"Summer Night City" is a song recorded by the Swedish recording group ABBA, written by Benny Andersson and Björn Ulvaeus as a tribute to their hometown of Stockholm. It was released on 6 September 1978, via Polar Music, as a standalone single; it was the group's second non-album single after "Fernando". While it was recorded during sessions for the group's then-upcoming sixth studio album Voulez-Vous (1979), it was scrapped from the album. It was, however, included on the group's compilation album Greatest Hits Vol. 2, a year after its release. Both Andersson and Ulvaeus have shared dislike of the song, due to being unsatisfied with the final mix.

While "Summer Night City" was a chart success, it proved less so than previous hits. It charted within the top ten in thirteen countries, and topped the charts in Finland, Ireland and Sweden, the group's last number one hit in their native country for over 40 years until "Don't Shut Me Down" in 2021. A planned US release was cancelled, the second ABBA single to be shelved following "Eagle", and charted poorly in Canada. It was featured as a bonus track on both the 1997 and 2001 CD re-issues of Voulez-Vous and as the full-length version with the original intro on the 2010 re-issue. It is featured on More ABBA Gold: More ABBA Hits.

== History ==
The recording sessions for "Summer Night City" began on 29 May 1978, under the working title "Kalle Skändare". Another working title was "Dancing in the Moonlight". ABBA's new recording studio, Polar Music Studio, had opened in May 1978 but had not been ready to use initially, so the primary backing track had been recorded at Metronome Studio. A 43-second ballad-style introduction to the song had been edited out to improve the overall quality but nothing seemed to work. Allegedly, mixing the single took at least a week, far more than it took to mix any other track in ABBA's recording history. In the end, the song had an enormous amount of compression applied to it to give it a more "driving" sound.

Agnetha Fältskog has been quoted as saying she did not like the song to start with, as she felt "it wasn't ABBA" but later on grew to like it. A reluctant ABBA decided to release "Summer Night City" as a single in September despite their disappointment with the track in its current form. It garnered minor controversy in the United Kingdom due to some listeners mishearing the fade out line "walking in the moonlight" as the more explicit "fucking in the moonlight". The group still performed the song live on their 1979 world tour, though with the original introduction that had been removed from the studio recording. The previously unreleased version with the extended introduction was finally released as part of the box set Thank You for the Music in 1994.

Their ambivalence about the record has surfaced occasionally in interviews where Andersson said "we shouldn't have released that one" and Björn Ulvaeus called the recording "really lousy".

=== B-side: Medley ===
The single's B-side was a medley of the American traditional songs "Pick a Bale of Cotton", "On Top of Old Smokey" and "Midnight Special", which the group had recorded in May 1975. This was the only song released by ABBA that was not written by any of the members themselves. On the single, "Medley" was actually a re-equalised version of the original 1975 version that had been issued on the German charity album Stars im Zeichen eines guten Sterns (Polydor). However, the 1978 compressed version is very similar, so much so that a mistake was made in the booklet notes of the 1994 4-CD boxed set Thank You for the Music. It turned out that the 1975 original version was included in that set but it was claimed to be the 1978 compressed. The "Medley" mystery was allegedly solved when the UK single master tapes were returned by Epic Records to Polar Music in Sweden in the early 2000s. As the UK tapes had definitely included the 1978 compressed version, it then became possible to determine which version was which. As explained by ABBA historian Carl Magnus Palm:

When The Complete Studio Recordings was put together, I and the mastering engineer tried to determine whether it actually was two different mixes. The conclusion was that it probably was and so both versions were included in the box set. However, since then it's finally been determined that they are one and the same mix, the difference being that the 1978 "version" was subjected to a lot more compression, presumably to make it sound more like the highly compressed "Summer Night City" A-side of the single.

== Critical reception ==
In a contemporary review, the British Record Business gave it a mixed review. Although noting the "hustling disco rhythm swathed in the customary rich, intricate ABBA production" would give the group another hit, they also called it the group's weakest single in years. Robin Smith of Record Mirror negatively described it as a "piece of disco muzak [that'll] slip into your memory," but noted that it would become a hit. Classic Pop ranked it as ABBA's 23rd best song.

== Commercial reception ==
=== United Kingdom ===
In the United Kingdom "Summer Night City" debuted at number 21 on the UK Singles Chart the week of 16 September 1978 and was the most added song to UK radio stations that week. It was certified Silver on the day of its release. It reached a peak position of number five in its fourth week before exiting the top ten, spending nine weeks in total on the chart. Although it marked ABBA's ninth consecutive UK top-ten hit, it was their first since "SOS" to miss the top three and was ABBA's lowest-peaking single for the period between 1976 and 1980. The song's lower than usual British chart placement, along with Ulvaeus and Benny Andersson's disliking of the released recording, led to the full-length version being scrapped from Voulez-Vous. As of September 2021, it is ABBA's 18th-biggest song in the UK in both pure sales and digital streams.

=== Europe ===
Across Europe "Summer Night City" entered the top ten in nearly all markets where it charted. In the group's native Sweden the single debuted at number three on the Sverigetopplistan before rising to number one, marking ABBA's last number-one hit in their own country for 43 years until September 2021 when their comeback single "Don't Shut Me Down" reached the top spot. In neighboring Denmark, Norway and Finland, the single reached position numbers nine, three and one, respectively. While it peaked at number three on Belgium's Ultratop 50 chart, "Summer Night City" marked the group's first single since "I Do, I Do, I Do, I Do, I Do" to miss the top two. Similarly in the Netherlands, usually a successful market for ABBA, "Summer Night City" stalled at number ten in the Single Top 100, the group's poorest showing since "Mamma Mia" peaked at number 12 in 1975. The single reached the top spot in Ireland and top-ten status in Iceland, Switzerland and West Germany.

=== Australia ===
The group were already experiencing a decline in sales in Australia and New Zealand when "Summer Night City" was released there via RCA Victor. In Australia the single debuted the week of 16 October 1978 on the Kent Music Report at number 57 and reached as high as number 13 on 27 November; it was an improvement from the group's previous single "Eagle / Thank You for the Music", which only peaked at number 82, but was the third consecutive single from the group to miss the top ten. It charted even worse in neighboring New Zealand, debuting and peaking at number 37 on 26 November 1978, and stayed in the RMNZ Singles Chart for only one week, becoming ABBA's lowest charting hit until "One of Us" stalled at number 43 in February 1982.

=== North America and other territories ===
"Summer Night City" was all but ignored in North America. In the United States it was shelved by Atlantic Records, ABBA's North American record label. Although Atlantic realized the song's potential to be a chart hit, the group couldn't guarantee its inclusion on an album to be released before Christmas of that year, so the label refused to release the single without a much more profitable and immediate follow-up album. However, it did get a release in Canada, where the single reached a dismal position of number 90 on the RPM Top Singles listing; it charted higher at number 34 on the CRIA chart, which tracked sales only at retailers. The single also charted in Mexico, peaking at number 10, and marked the group's eighth consecutive top-ten hit.

It proved a success in Rhodesia (now Zimbabwe) and Japan, peaking at number four in the former and number 24 in the latter.

== Use in media ==
"Summer Night City" is featured in the musical Mamma Mia!, heard in scrambled "nightmare" form during the entr'acte and as scene-change music between the numbers "The Winner Takes It All" and "Take a Chance on Me".

It has been included in the set list for ABBA's Voyage concert residency in London since its opening in May 2022.

== Charts ==
=== Weekly charts ===
Weekly chart performance for "Summer Night City"
Chart (1978)	Peak position
Australia (Kent Music Report)	13
Austria (Ö3 Austria Top 40)	18
Belgium (Ultratop 50 Flanders)	3
Canada Top Singles (CRIA)	34
Canada Top Singles (RPM)	90
Denmark (IFPI)	9
Europe (Europarade Singles)	1
Finland (Suomen virallinen lista)	1
France (SNEP)	15
Iceland (Morgunblaðið)	2
Ireland (IRMA)	1
Japan (Music Labo)	19
Japan (Oricon)	24
Mexico (Mexican Singles Chart)	10
Netherlands (Dutch Top 40)	5
Netherlands (Single Top 100)	10
New Zealand (Recorded Music NZ)	37
Norway (VG-lista)	3
Rhodesia (Rhodesian Singles Chart)	4
Sweden (Sverigetopplistan)	1
Switzerland (Schweizer Hitparade)	5
UK Singles (Official Charts)	5
West Germany (GfK)	6

=== Year-end charts ===
Year-end chart performance for "Summer Night City"
Chart (1978)	Position
Belgium (Ultratop Flanders)	38
Netherlands (Dutch Top 40)	52
Netherlands (Single Top 100)	69

== Release history ==
Region	Date	Title	Label	Format	Catalog
Scandinavia	6 September 1978	"Summer Night City" / "Medley: Pick a Bale of Cotton / On Top of Old Smoky / Midnight Special"	Polar	7-inch vinyl	POS 1239
UK, Ireland	8 September 1978	"Summer Night City" / "Medley: Pick a Bale of Cotton / On Top of Old Smoky / Midnight Special"	Epic	7-inch vinyl	S EPC 6595
Austria, Kenya, India, Netherlands, Portugal, Switzerland, West Germany	9 September 1978	"Summer Night City" / "Medley: Pick a Bale of Cotton / On Top of Old Smoky / Midnight Special"	Polydor	7-inch vinyl	2001 810
France	September 1978	"Summer Night City" / "Medley: Pick a Bale of Cotton / On Top of Old Smoky / Midnight Special"	Melba, Vogue	7-inch vinyl	45. X. 180
Spain	September 1978	"Summer Night City" / "Medley: Pick a Bale of Cotton / On Top of Old Smoky / Midnight Special"	Carnaby	7-inch vinyl	MO 1814
Australia, New Zealand	2 October 1978	"Summer Night City" / "Medley: Pick a Bale of Cotton / On Top of Old Smoky / Midnight Special"	RCA Victor	7-inch vinyl	103202
Japan	5 October 1978	"Summer Night City" / "Medley: Pick a Bale of Cotton / On Top of Old Smoky / Midnight Special"	Discomate	7-inch vinyl	DSP-122
Canada	13 October 1978	"Summer Night City" / "Medley: Pick a Bale of Cotton / On Top of Old Smoky / Midnight Special"	Atlantic	7-inch vinyl	3515
USA	13 October 1978	"Summer Night City" / "Summer Night City"	Atlantic	7-inch vinyl, test pressing	3515
USA	Unreleased	"Summer Night City" / "Medley: Pick a Bale of Cotton / On Top of Old Smoky / Midnight Special"	Atlantic	7-inch vinyl	3515
Mexico	October 1978	"Summer Night City" / "Medley: Pick a Bale of Cotton / On Top of Old Smoky / Midnight Special"	RCA Victor	7-inch vinyl	SP-5093
Greece	1978	"Summer Night City" / "Medley: Pick a Bale of Cotton / On Top of Old Smoky / Midnight Special"	Pan-Vox	7-inch vinyl	PAN 7602
Hungary	1978	"Summer Night City" / "Medley: Pick a Bale of Cotton / On Top of Old Smoky / Midnight Special"	Pepita	7-inch vinyl	SPSK 70334
Turkey	1978	"Summer Night City" / "Medley: Pick a Bale of Cotton / On Top of Old Smoky / Midnight Special"	Balet	7-inch vinyl	BE 221
Yugoslavia	1978	"Summer Night City" / "Medley: Pick a Bale of Cotton / On Top of Old Smoky / Midnight Special"	PGP RTB	7-inch vinyl	S 54030
South Africa, Rhodesia	1978	"Summer Night City" / "Medley: Pick a Bale of Cotton / On Top of Old Smoky / Midnight Special"	Sunshine	7-inch vinyl	GBS 131
South Africa	1978	"Summer Night City" / "Save Me" (Clout)	Sunshine	12-inch, promo	SP 1
Philippines	1978	"Summer Night City" / "Medley: Pick a Bale of Cotton / On Top of Old Smoky / Midnight Special"	Polydor	7-inch vinyl	PRO 3533
Argentina	1978	"Summer Night City" / "Medley: Pick a Bale of Cotton / On Top of Old Smoky / Midnight Special"	RCA Victor	7-inch vinyl	41A-3043
Brazil	1978	"Summer Night City" / "Medley: Pick a Bale of Cotton / On Top of Old Smoky / Midnight Special"	RCA Victor	7-inch vinyl	101.8107
Dominican Republic	1978	"Summer Night City" / "Medley: Pick a Bale of Cotton / On Top of Old Smoky / Midnight Special"	RCA Victor	7-inch vinyl	DRK-9145
Ecuador	1978	"Summer Night City" / "Medley: Pick a Bale of Cotton / On Top of Old Smoky / Midnight Special"	RCA Victor	7-inch vinyl	ECK-200759
El Salvador	1978	"Summer Night City" / "Medley: Pick a Bale of Cotton / On Top of Old Smoky / Midnight Special"	RCA Victor	7-inch vinyl	CA-10522
Panama, Peru	1978	"Summer Night City" / "Medley: Pick a Bale of Cotton / On Top of Old Smoky / Midnight Special"	RCA Victor	7-inch vinyl	POS 1239
Venezuela	1978	"Summer Night City" / "Medley: Pick a Bale of Cotton / On Top of Old Smoky / Midnight Special"	RCA Victor	7-inch vinyl	45-830
Europe	18 June 1993	"Summer Night City" / "I Do, I Do, I Do, I Do, I Do"	Polar, Polydor	CD	859 212-2
Europe	1993	"Summer Night City" / "Eagle" / "Ring Ring"	Polar, Polydor	12-inch, promo	ABBA 1 DJ
Europe	21 April 2018	"Summer Night City" / "Medley: Pick a Bale of Cotton / On Top of Old Smoky / Midnight Special"	Polar, Record Store Day	7-inch vinyl, splattered colour vinyl	00602567381457
Europe	2019	"Summer Night City" / "Medley: Pick a Bale of Cotton / On Top of Old Smoky / Midnight Special"	Polar	7-inch vinyl, picture disc	00602577237560

== Covers ==
In alphabetical order:

- Abbacadabra - "Summer Night City" (Almighty Definitive Radio Edit) (1998).
- Claire Richards and Andy Bell — singer of Erasure — recorded their version as the second single from Richards' 2023 album Euphoria.
- Offer Nissim & Maya - "Summer Night City" from the album First Time (2005).
- Therion - "Summer Night City" (Digipak edition of Secret of the Runes (2001).
