= I Wonder (Departure) =

- UK B-side label

Song by ABBA

from the album The Album
- A-side: "The Name of the Game"
- Released: 12 December 1977
- Length: 4:33
- Label: Polar
- Songwriters: Benny Andersson, Björn Ulvaeus, Stig Anderson
- Producers: Benny Andersson & Björn Ulvaeus

Audio video
- "I Wonder (Departure)" on YouTube

"I Wonder (Departure)" is a song by ABBA, released on their 1977 album ABBA: The Album. It was originally part of the ABBA-produced mini-musical The Girl with the Golden Hair, which they performed at the end of each of their 1977 concert tours.

== Usage in Mamma Mia! film ==
In a hypothetical sequel to Mamma Mia! put together by the British newspaper, The Daily Telegraph, the song is sung at a point in the musical where Sophie "dreams of cutting loose [from Sky] and heading abroad". In the film Mamma Mia! Here We Go Again, the song is performed by Young Donna (played by Lily James) on the soundtrack album; however, the performance (early in the film prior to Donna leaving her friends) was deleted. The performance was included as an extra on the DVD release.

== Synopsis ==
The song is about whether the narrator should leave behind everything she knows in order to pursue something greater. The book ABBA: Let The Music Speak argues that the song parallels Frida's own life story, in regard to the "momentous decision she took in her early 20s to leave her young family in pursuit of singing stardom".

== Release ==
A live recording of the song served as the flip side to the single "The Name of the Game", recorded during the Australian leg of the tour.

== Composition ==
The lead vocalist on the song is Frida. The Chicago Tribune notes that Frida stutters the line "I wonder ... it scares me". The song has an orchestral arrangement featuring harp, French horn, and oboe.

== Critical reception ==
ABBA: Let the Music Speak says that Frida provides the song with "maximum emotional leverage", making it "the most intimate personal portrait" out of the three mini-musical tracks to be featured on ABBA: The Album. It adds that the song would "translate beautifully to the stage" and become a tearjerker. It goes on to mention that her internal conflict is handled well, concluding that "from wistful reflection to strident defiance and back again, Frida's performance...is up there with the greats of the genre".
