= ABBA: The Album =

1977 studio album by ABBA

Studio album by ABBA
- Released: 12 December 1977
- Recorded: 31 May – November 1977
- Studios: Marcus, Stockholm; Metronome, Stockholm; Glen, Stockholm; Bohus, Kungälv
- Genres: Art rock; dance-rock; pop
- Length: 39:53 (Polar 1977 LP)
- Labels: Polar; Epic (UK); Atlantic (US original release)
- Producers: Benny Andersson; Björn Ulvaeus

ABBA chronology
Arrival (1976)	ABBA: The Album (1977)	Voulez-Vous (1979)

Original UK album cover

Singles from ABBA: The Album
- 1. "The Name of the Game" Released: 17 October 1977; 2. "Take a Chance on Me" Released: 27 January 1978; 3. "Eagle" / "Thank You for the Music" Released: May 1978

ABBA: The Album (also known as simply The Album) is the fifth studio album by the Swedish pop group ABBA. It was released in Scandinavia on 12 December 1977 through Polar Music, but due to the massive amount of pre-orders, the UK pressing plants were not able to press sufficient copies before Christmas 1977 and so it was not released in the UK until January 1978. The album was released in conjunction with ABBA: The Movie, with the same cover, technically functioning as the soundtrack, with several of the songs featured in the film. Altogether, the album contains nine songs.

The album contained two UK number-one singles, "Take a Chance on Me" and "The Name of the Game", as well as European hits "Eagle" and "Thank You for the Music".

== Background and production ==
The album includes three songs from ABBA's 1977 tour mini-musical The Girl with the Golden Hair performed during each of their European and Australian shows in 1977. Andersson and Ulvaeus wanted to offer more than "a run through of their hits and assorted album tracks" for their concerts. Although the songs received a "less-than-tumultuous" reception during the first performances of the mini-musical, three of the tracks ("Thank You for the Music", "I Wonder (Departure)" and "I'm a Marionette") were included on the new album. A fourth song written for the musical, "Get on the Carousel", was rewritten as the up-tempo track "Hole in Your Soul" with "a substantial part of the melody [being] incorporated into [its] middle eight". Parts of "Get on the Carousel" appeared in ABBA: The Movie. The "25-minute opus" had a storyline about a talented "small-town girl leaving her hometown" on her "quest for stardom", with each song representing a different part of her personality. Fältskog and Lyngstad shared the lead-role and wore matching blonde wigs and costumes "for optimum dramatic effect".

== Release ==
ABBA: The Album was released in Scandinavia on 12 December 1977. It was first released on CD in 1984. The album has been reissued in the format by PolyGram (later Universal Music) four times; first in 1997, then in 2001, in 2005 as part of The Complete Studio Recordings box set and again in 2007 as a two disc "Deluxe Edition".

The deluxe edition was issued for the album's 30th anniversary and consisted of two discs. The first one was a CD version of the album, expanded with six bonus tracks, and featuring the first recording of "Thank You for the Music", known as the Doris Day version due to Agnetha's vocal inspiration. The second one was a DVD of previously unreleased TV material, which included: two performances of "Take a Chance on Me" from ZDF's Star Parade and Radio Bremen's Am laufende Band; two performances of "Thank You for the Music" from Star Parade (performed alongside "Eagle") and Mike Yarwood's Christmas Show; a "The Name of the Game" performance from the Japanese ABBA Special (on TBS); a February 1978 interview with the band from BBC's Blue Peter, titled "ABBA in London"; three SVT news reports on the band: two from Rapport, titled "ABBA in America" (May 1978) and "ABBA on tour in 1977", and one from Gomorron Sverige, titled "Recording ABBA – The Album"; two ABBA: The Album television commercials; and the "International Sleeve Gallery". This set also featured a 28-page illustrated booklet with an essay on the making of the album.

On November 3, 2017, ABBA: The Album was reissued for its 40th anniversary with a half-speed mastered, 45 rpm cut double-LP version of the original album, featuring new liner notes by Carl Magnus Palm; a 7-inch singles box set of "The Name of the Game", "Take a Chance on Me", and "Eagle", pressed on colored vinyl (blue, red and yellow, respectively); and 7" picture discs of each of these three singles.

== Album cover ==
Polar's official cover made by art director Rune Söderqvist featured an entirely white background, and is the basis for current CD versions. However, Epic Records' original UK release of the LP featured a blue background on the front cover, fading to white at the bottom. It also featured a gatefold sleeve. The back cover was altered, incorporating a similar photo of ABBA to that used elsewhere in the world for the inner sleeve, and referencing tracks included in ABBA: The Movie. The inner gatefold was designed to look like an air mail envelope, similar to the style later used for Gracias Por La Música and even had a photo of ABBA incorporated into a stamp in the corner.

This was the first and only time that Epic radically broke away from the standard Polar Music design for an ABBA album. The UK design for ABBA: The Album has only been re-issued on LP format once, in the 2008 European reissue.

== Critical reception ==
Professional ratings
Review scores
Source	Rating
AllMusic	4/5 stars
The Encyclopedia of Popular Music	3/5 stars
NME	7/10
Ondarock	6.5/10
The Rolling Stone Album Guide	4/5 stars
Spin Alternative Record Guide	8/10

The Album received positive reviews from music critics. Contemporarily, Music Week gave an 'album of the week' rating saying they had "maintained their consistently high levels of musicianship and originality" and that "they had a steady grasp on the pulse of popular taste." Record Mirror seemed to give the album a grudgingly good review, saying it was "(partly) superb". It singled out "One Man One Woman" as the best track and also gave high praise to "Eagle" and "Name of the Game". It declared however that the second side was a sharp drop in quality. It said that "Move On" was "a respectable little pop tune (but not a patch on side one)" and that "Hole in Your Soul" "starts off well". After that it criticised the mini musical's three songs and said the lyrics were very poor. Although rating the album four stars out of five, the reviewer called the group "repugnant".

Bruce Eder from AllMusic wrote retrospectively that the album marked a "step forward for the group" since they "absorb and assimilate some of the influences around them, particularly the laid-back California sound of Fleetwood Mac (...) as well as some of the attributes of progressive rock" but "without compromising their essential virtues as a pop ensemble". John Rockwell from Rolling Stone gave the album a favorable review and wrote that The Album represents an interesting departure from their past formulas like "innocently superficial lyrics, bouncy Europop music, rock energy and amplification, soaring melodies" to a more mature and intelligent record. NME wrote a short review to the album when it turned 30 years old, and wrote that the album "still sounds pleasantly nostalgic" and had "some delicious pop nuggets from their Swedish hatch".

== Commercial performance ==
ABBA: The Album reached No. 1 in many territories. In the UK it debuted at the top and remained there for seven weeks, ending up as the third biggest selling album of the year (behind the movie soundtrack LPs of Saturday Night Fever and Grease). In the US it became their highest-charting album during their original run, where during 1978 ABBA undertook a big promotional campaign.

== Track listing ==
All tracks are written by Benny Andersson and Björn Ulvaeus, except where noted.

Side one
No.	Title	Writer(s)	Length
1.	"Eagle"		5:51
2.	"Take a Chance on Me"		4:05
3.	"One Man, One Woman"		4:25
4.	"The Name of the Game"	Andersson; Stig Anderson; Ulvaeus	4:54

Side two
No.	Title	Writer(s)	Length
1.	"Move On"	Andersson; Anderson; Ulvaeus	4:42
2.	"Hole in Your Soul"		3:41
3.	"Thank You for the Music"		3:48
4.	"I Wonder (Departure)"	Andersson; Anderson; Ulvaeus	4:33
5.	"I'm a Marionette"		3:54
Total length:			39:53

Notes

- The album's last three tracks were originally from the 1977 tour mini-musical The Girl with the Golden Hair. They are presented on the album as "3 scenes from a mini-musical" and are listed from A to C.

=== Deluxe edition ===
Released for the album's 30th anniversary. All tracks are written by Benny Andersson and Björn Ulvaeus, except where noted.

Bonus tracks
No.	Title	Writer(s)	Length
1.	"Eagle" (single edit)		4:25
2.	"Take a Chance on Me" (live version; alternate mix)		4:25
3.	"Thank You for the Music" (Doris Day version)		4:03
4.	"Al andar" (Spanish version of "Move On")	Andersson; Stig Anderson; Ulvaeus; Buddy McCluskey; Mary McCluskey	4:43
5.	"I Wonder (Departure)" (live version; B-side of "The Name of the Game")	Andersson; Anderson; Ulvaeus	4:27
6.	"Gracias por la música" (Spanish version of "Thank You for the Music")	Andersson; Anderson; Ulvaeus; B. McCluskey; M. McCluskey	3:49

== Personnel ==
Adapted from the album's liner notes and AllMusic.

ABBA

- Agnetha Fältskog – lead vocals (5, 7), co-lead vocals (1, 2, 4, 6, 9), backing vocals
- Anni-Frid Lyngstad – lead vocals (3, 8), co-lead vocals (1, 2, 4, 6, 9), backing vocals
- Björn Ulvaeus – acoustic guitar, electric guitar, mandolin, spoken word intro (5), backing vocals
- Benny Andersson – keyboards, synthesizer, backing vocals

Additional musicians

- Rutger Gunnarsson – bass guitar
- Ola Brunkert – drums
- Roger Palm – drums (2, 3, 7), tambourine
- Lasse Wellander – lead guitar, acoustic guitar, mandolin
- Janne Schaffer – lead guitar (1), electric guitar
- Malando Gassama – percussion
- Lars O. Carlsson – saxophones, flutes

Production

- Benny Andersson; Björn Ulvaeus – producers, arrangers
- Michael B. Tretow – engineer
- Rutger Gunnarsson – string arrangements
- Rune Söderqvist – album design
- Rune Söderqvist; Björn Andersson – illustrations
- Barry Levine / Mirage – photography
- Jon Astley; Michael B. Tretow – remastering

== Charts ==
=== Weekly charts ===
Initial weekly chart performance for ABBA: The Album
Chart (1977–78)	Peak position
Australian Albums (Kent Music Report)	4
Austrian Albums (Ö3 Austria)	2
Canada Top Albums/CDs (RPM)	8
Dutch Albums (Album Top 100)	1
Finnish Albums (Suomen virallinen lista)	2
German Albums (Offizielle Top 100)	2
Italian Albums (Musica e dischi)	25
Japanese Albums (Oricon)	9
New Zealand Albums (RMNZ)	1
Norwegian Albums (VG-lista)	1
Swedish Albums (Sverigetopplistan)	1
UK Albums (Official Charts)	1
US Billboard 200	14
US Top 100 Albums (Cash Box)	22
US The Album Chart (Record World)	33

Latter weekly chart performance for ABBA: The Album
Chart (2021–2022)	Peak position
Greek Albums (IFPI Greece)	41
Scottish Albums (Official Charts)	28
Swedish Albums (Sverigetopplistan)	29

=== Monthly charts ===
Monthly chart performance for ABBA: The Album
Chart (1979)	Position
Soviet Albums (Moskovskij Komsomolets)	2

=== Year-end charts ===
1978 year-end chart performance for ABBA: The Album
Chart (1978)	Position
Austrian Albums (Ö3 Austria)	2
Canada Top Albums/CDs (RPM)	42
Dutch Albums (Album Top 100)	4
German Albums (Offizielle Top 100)	5
New Zealand Albums (RMNZ)	19
UK Albums (OCC)	3
US Billboard 200	22

1979 year-end chart performance for ABBA: The Album
Chart (1979)	Position
Soviet Albums (Moskovskij Komsomolets)	5

1980 year-end chart performance for ABBA: The Album
Chart (1980)	Position
Soviet Albums (Moskovskij Komsomolets)	7

== Certifications and sales ==
Region	Certification	Certified units/sales
Australia (ARIA)	Platinum	50,000^{^}
Canada (Music Canada)	2× Platinum	200,000^{^}
Czechoslovakia	—	100,000
Denmark	—	225,000
Finland (Musiikkituottajat)	Platinum	57,618
France	—	150,000
Germany (BVMI)	Platinum	500,000^{^}
Hong Kong (IFPI Hong Kong)	Platinum	20,000^{*}
Japan	—	300,000
Netherlands (NVPI)	Platinum	100,000^{^}
Norway	—	200,840
Sweden	—	753,420
United Kingdom (BPI)	Platinum	1,000,000
United States (RIAA)	Platinum	1,300,000
^{*} Sales figures based on certification alone.^{^} Shipments figures based on certification alone.
