= Eagle (ABBA song) =

Single by ABBA

from the album The Album
- A-side: "Thank You for the Music"
- Released: 2 May 1978
- Recorded: June 1977
- Studio: Marcus Music Studio
- Genre: Progressive rock; art rock
- Length: 5:51 (Album Version); 4:25 (Short Version); 3:36 (7" Edit)
- Label: Polar Music
- Songwriters: Benny Andersson; Björn Ulvaeus
- Producers: Benny Andersson; Björn Ulvaeus

ABBA singles chronology
"Take a Chance on Me" (1978)	"Eagle" / "Thank You for the Music" (1978)	"Summer Night City" (1978)

Music video
- "Eagle" on YouTube

"Eagle" is a song by the Swedish recording group ABBA, recorded for their fifth studio album ABBA: The Album (1977). It serves as the opening track. The song features lead vocals by Agnetha Fältskog and Anni-Frid Lyngstad. At five minutes and 49 seconds, it is the longest track the group ever recorded. (Note: The Day Before You Came" (1982) is one second shorter.) It was released on 2 May 1978, via Polar Music, as the third and final single from the record in select European territories and Australia. In some countries, it was released as a double A-side single with "Thank You for the Music". (Note: In Belgium, France, and the Netherlands, it was as a double A-side with "Thank You for the Music".)

"Eagle" was not a major chart success for the group, although it peaked within the top ten in Belgium, the Netherlands, Switzerland, and West Germany. An edited version of the song is included on More ABBA Gold: More ABBA Hits (1993).

== Background ==
"Eagle" was written and composed by Benny Andersson and Björn Ulvaeus, who provided its music and its lyrics respectively, as a kind of tribute to a band that the two men admired at the time, the Eagles. The recording, which commenced on 1 June 1977, had the working titles of "High, High" and "The Eagle." Ulvaeus said that with the lyrics, he was "trying to capture the sense of freedom and euphoria" that he got from reading Richard Bach's 1970 novella Jonathan Livingston Seagull. In later years, music critics have hailed "Eagle" as one of ABBA's more outstanding tracks in terms of lyrics.

The track inspired the introduction to the 1981 song "Don't You Want Me" by the Human League.

== Reception ==
"Eagle" was not a major chart success. The major reason was that the song was already available on ABBA: The Album;. Another was the limited release only in selected areas. It was for instance withdrawn as a single in the United States. To make the song more radio-friendly it was heavily edited down from 5:51 to 4:25 by omitting an instrumental break and the third chorus. In some countries like Australia, France, Spain, South Africa and Scandinavia it got a further edit, with the song fading shortly after the 2nd chorus making it last just 3:33, 2:18 shorter than the album version.

The single was released on 18 May 1978 to fill the gap between the previous single, "Take a Chance on Me" and the next, a completely new track, eventually titled "Summer Night City." The B-side of "Eagle," "Thank You for the Music", was later released as a single outright in a few countries after the group had disbanded, namely in the UK, where "Eagle" had not been released as a single.

== Music video ==
The single was promoted with a music video directed by Lasse Hallström. The track was inserted into ABBA: The Movie as a fantasy sequence, created using an effects machine caused a "flutter box" which had been developed for the 1978 film Superman.

== 1999 re-edit ==
The original 4:25 single edit was issued on CD for the first time in 1993 on the compilation More ABBA Gold: More ABBA Hits. However, for the 1999 re-release of this album, plus subsequent releases, a new version based on the 1980 edit was created. Unfortunately, this edit left out a vital instrumental-only section at the end of the second chorus prior to the closing instrumental, thereby sounding disjointed. The original edit—or at least an exact re-creation of it—was finally issued again on the deluxe version of ABBA: The Album in 2009.

== Personnel ==
ABBA

- Agnetha Fältskog – lead and backing vocals
- Anni-Frid Lyngstad – lead and backing vocals
- Björn Ulvaeus – backing vocals, acoustic rhythm guitar
- Benny Andersson – backing vocals, keyboards

Additional personnel and production staff

- Janne Schaffer – lead guitar
- Lasse Wellander – lead guitar
- Rutger Gunnarsson – bass
- Ola Brunkert – drums
- Malando Gassama – percussion

== Charts ==
=== Weekly charts ===
Weekly chart performance for "Eagle"
Chart (1978)	Peak position
Australia (Kent Music Report) "Eagle" / "Thank You for the Music"	82
Austria (Ö3 Austria Top 40)	17
Belgium (Ultratop 50 Flanders) "Eagle" / "Thank You for the Music"	2
Netherlands (Dutch Top 40) "Eagle" / "Thank You for the Music"	4
Netherlands (Single Top 100) "Eagle" / "Thank You for the Music"	7
Switzerland (Schweizer Hitparade)	7
West Germany (GfK)	6

=== Year-end charts ===
Year-end chart performance for "Eagle"
Chart (1978)	Position
Belgium (Ultratop 50 Flanders) "Eagle" / "Thank You for the Music"	24
Germany (Official German Charts)	33
Netherlands (Dutch Top 40) "Eagle" / "Thank You for the Music"	60
Netherlands (Single Top 100) "Eagle" / "Thank You for the Music"	67
