= Thank You for the Music =

1977 song by ABBA

- 1983 UK release cover

Single by ABBA

from the album The Album
- A-side: "Eagle"
- B-side: "Our Last Summer" (1983 reissue)
- Released: 2 May 1978
- Recorded: 21 July 1977
- Studio: Glen Studio
- Genre: Pop
- Length: 3:52
- Label: Polar
- Songwriters: Benny Andersson; Björn Ulvaeus
- Producers: Benny Andersson; Björn Ulvaeus

ABBA singles chronology
| "Take a Chance on Me" (1978) | "Eagle" / "Thank You for the Music" (1978) | "Summer Night City" (1978) |
| "Under Attack" (1982) | "Thank You for the Music" (1983) | "Dancing Queen" (1992) |
| "Voulez-Vous" (1992) | "Thank You for the Music" (1992) | "Summer Night City" (1993) |

Music video
- "Thank You for the Music" on YouTube

"Thank You for the Music" is a song by the Swedish pop group ABBA, recorded for their fifth studio album The Album (1977). Agnetha Fältskog sang lead vocals. It was originally released on 2 May 1978, as a double a-side single with "Eagle" in limited territories.

The single has gone on to become a fan favorite from the group. As a double A-side single with "Eagle", it cracked the top ten in Belgium, the Netherlands, Switzerland, and West Germany. In South Africa, it was released as a standalone single and peaked at number two on the Springbok Radio chart. In 1980, the single was recorded in Spanish, with lyrics provided by Buddy and Mary McCluskey, as ""Gracias por la Música", and released in Latin America to promote the group's Spanish-language compilation Gracias Por La Música, peaking at number four in Argentina. Later, in November 1983, the song was released in the United Kingdom for the first time, to promote the British-exclusive compilation album Thank You for the Music (1983), and become a minor top-forty hit on the UK singles chart.

"Thank You for the Music" also formed part of ABBA: The Movie which featured studio recordings of selected songs from the then newly released album ABBA: The Album. The song is included in the final scenes as the hapless journalist finally gets to broadcast his ABBA radio special, including an interview, on Australian radio. The song is accompanied by footage of a studio recording session, a live stage performance and a mimed studio performance by the four members of the group. The song also plays over the closing titles as the camera pans out from the band performing in a hut on an island in the Stockholm archipelago to views of the archipelago itself.

== History ==
According to the ABBA historian Carl Magnus Palm, Andersson came up with the first half of the chorus at a piano during a party at Stig Anderson's home, and Ulvaeus wrote the lyrics at his and Fältskog's home on Lidingö. The recording of "Thank You for the Music" started in Marcus Music Studio in Stockholm, on 2 June 1977. The group had also performed the tune at their concert tour through Europe and Australia during the spring of 1977, as part of a mini-musical "The Girl with the Golden Hair" where the song was used as an ending encore. The lyrics used in this live version were slightly different from the studio version recorded later. Before the tour, in December 1976, Andersson and Ulvaeus also performed a segment of the melody on piano and acoustic guitar on the Swedish evening news programme "Rapport".

The first recording of the tune had an old-time feel with a hint of ragtime, and Agnetha Fältskog's lead vocal was inspired by the American singer Doris Day. The group later made another arrangement of the same melody, which became the more widely known version. The first version was released in its entirety on the 1994 CD box "Thank You for the Music". The backing track for the later version was recorded on 21 July 1977 at Glen Studio, which had moved the previous year from the basement of Bruno Glenmark's family home to a former grocery shop nearby.

The song was included on "The Album" and was used as a final melody in the film "ABBA – The Movie", which had its premiere at Christmas of 1977. The single "Eagle" of May 1978 also had this song as its B-side. It was later included in "Greatest Hits Vol. 2" released in the fall of 1979 when ABBA started touring North America and Europe. A promotion video was recorded in February 1978, directed by Lasse Hallström, where ABBA sings "Thank You for the Music" in front of kids singing along.

"Thank You for the Music" was later included on "ABBA Gold – Greatest Hits" of 1992. In 1999, it was used for the musical "Mamma Mia!", and in 2008 for the film with the same title. When the musical was translated into Swedish by Niklas Strömstedt, it got the title "Tack för alla sånger" ("Thanks for all the songs").

== Reception ==
It was not released as a single in the United Kingdom and Ireland until late 1983, peaking at number 33 and number 17 respectively. In the Netherlands, the song peaked at number 23. The title of the song "Thank You for the Music" is often taken to signal the end of ABBA, leading it to be considered a farewell song.

As of September 2021, it is ABBA's 20th-biggest song in the UK, including both pure sales and digital streams.

== Charts ==
=== Weekly charts ===
| Chart (1980) | Peak position |
|---|---|
| Argentina | 7 |
| Australia (Kent Music Report) | 82 |
| South Africa (Springbok) | 2 |

| Chart (1983–84) | Peak position |
|---|---|
| Ireland (IRMA) | 17 |
| Netherlands (Dutch Top 40) | 38 |
| Netherlands (Single Top 100) | 23 |
| UK Singles (OCC) | 33 |

=== Year-end charts ===
| Chart (1978) | Rank |
|---|---|
| South Africa (Springbok) | 18 |

== Certifications ==
| Region | Certification | Certified units/sales |
|---|---|---|
| New Zealand (RMNZ) | Gold | 15,000^{‡} |
| United Kingdom (BPI) | Gold | 400,000^{‡} |
^{‡} Sales+streaming figures based on certification alone.

== Personnel ==
ABBA

- Agnetha Fältskog – lead and backing vocals
- Anni-Frid Lyngstad – backing vocals
- Björn Ulvaeus – backing vocals, acoustic rhythm guitar, mandolin
- Benny Andersson – backing vocals, keyboards

Additional personnel and production staff

- Lasse Wellander – acoustic lead guitar, mandolin
- Rutger Gunnarsson – bass
- Roger Palm – drums, tambourine
