= Take a Chance on Me =

1978 song by Swedish pop group ABBA

Single by ABBA

from the album ABBA: The Album
- B-side: "I'm a Marionette"
- Released: 27 January 1978
- Recorded: 15 August 1977
- Studio: Marcus Music Studio
- Genre: Europop; disco
- Length: 4:05
- Label: Polar (Sweden); Epic (UK); Atlantic (US)
- Songwriters: Benny Andersson; Björn Ulvaeus
- Producers: Benny Andersson; Björn Ulvaeus

ABBA singles chronology
"The Name of the Game" (1977)	"Take a Chance on Me" (1978)	"Eagle" / "Thank You for the Music" (1978)

Music video
- "Take a Chance on Me" on YouTube

Alternative release
- US picture sleeve cover

"Take a Chance on Me" is a song by Swedish recording group ABBA, released on 27 January 1978 in the United Kingdom, by Polar Music, as the second single from their fifth studio album, ABBA: The Album (1977). Agnetha Fältskog and Anni-Frid Lyngstad share the lead vocals on the verses and choruses, with Fältskog singing two bridge sections solo. The song reached the top ten in both the UK and US, and was notably covered by the British band Erasure in 1992.

== Background and release ==
The working title of "Take a Chance on Me" was "Billy Boy". (An excerpt of "Billy Boy" was released on the 1994 box set Thank You for the Music, as part of the track ABBA Undeleted, which consisted of demos, early and alternate versions of completed songs, and unfinished songs.) Written and recorded in 1977 by Benny Andersson and Björn Ulvaeus, the song was one of ABBA's first singles in which their manager Stig Anderson did not assist with writing the lyrics, confirming Andersson and Ulvaeus as a songwriting partnership.

The song's origins sprang from Ulvaeus, a keen runner, who would repeat a "tck-a-ch"-style rhythm to pace himself. This evolved into "take-a-chance" and the eventual lyrics. Roger Palm, the drummer on the track, described the song as "ABBA at their most energetic and forceful".

The single's B-side was "I'm a Marionette", which, like "Thank You for the Music" and "I Wonder (Departure)" (the B-side to their previous single, "The Name of the Game"), was part of a mini-musical entitled The Girl With the Golden Hair performed during their 1977 concert tour.

== Reception ==
=== Critical reception ===
Ian Dury of NME wrote a mixed review, commenting that "just because Frankie Lymon is dead doesn't mean that Benny and Björn should really be producing Frankie Vaughan. Or Frankie Howerd." Barry Cain of Record Mirror negatively described "Take a Chance on Me" as derivative of ABBA's previous work, but did claim that it would hit number one. Billboard magazine described "Take a Chance on Me" as "one of [ABBA's] most busy, fast paced productions." Cash Box said that the vocals "are intricately arranged to produce a wall of sound." Record World called it a "pleasing tune, very well arranged" with "one of pop's most captivating acappella openings since Blue Swede tackled 'Hooked on a Feeling.'"

=== Commercial reception ===
"Take a Chance on Me" proved to be one of ABBA's most successful chart hits, becoming the group's seventh UK number one (and third consecutive chart-topper in the country after "Knowing Me, Knowing You" and "The Name of the Game"). It was also ABBA's final number one in the UK of the 1970s and gave the group the distinction of being the act with the most chart-topping singles of the 1970s in the UK. It sold and streamed over 600,000 units to receive a platinum disc. As of September 2021, it is the group's fourth-biggest song in the country with 950,000 chart sales (including 882,000 pure sales). In the United States it reached number three and was certified gold for one million sales. The song peaked at number three in Canada and West Germany as well.

=== Legacy ===
"Take a Chance on Me" has been widely regarded as one of ABBA's finest songs. In 2017, Billboard ranked the song number two on their list of the 15 greatest ABBA songs, and in 2021, Rolling Stone ranked the song number nine on their list of the 25 greatest ABBA songs.

In the American TV comedy series The Office Season 4, Episode 3 episode "Launch Party", character Andy Bernard serenades coworker Angela with the song in hopes of scoring a date, with the assistance of his a cappella group, "Here Comes Treble," providing backup vocals over the phone.

== Personnel ==
- Agnetha Fältskog – vocals
- Anni-Frid Lyngstad – vocals
- Björn Ulvaeus – acoustic guitar, electric guitar, vocals
- Benny Andersson – keyboards, synthesizers, vocals

=== Additional musicians ===
- Rutger Gunnarsson – bass
- Roger Palm – drums
- Malando Gassama – percussion

== Track listings ==
- Standard 7-inch single
1. "Take a Chance on Me" – 4:05
2. "I'm a Marionette" – 3:54
- Yugoslavian 7-inch single
1. "Take a Chance on Me"
2. "Thank You for the Music"
- Brazilian 7-inch single
1. "Take a Chance on Me" – 3:59
2. "One Man, One Woman" – 4:30

== Charts ==
=== Weekly charts ===
Weekly chart performance for "Take a Chance on Me"
Chart (1978)	Peak position
Australia (Kent Music Report)	12
Austria (Ö3 Austria Top 40)	1
Belgium (Ultratop 50 Flanders)	1
Canada (CRIA)	7
Canada Top Singles (RPM)	3
Canada Adult Contemporary (RPM)	7
Finland (Suomen virallinen lista)	18
Ireland (IRMA)	1
Netherlands (Dutch Top 40)	2
Netherlands (Single Top 100)	2
New Zealand (Recorded Music NZ)	14
Norway (VG-lista)	8
Rhodesia (Rhodesian Singles Chart)	2
South Africa (Springbok)	6
Switzerland (Schweizer Hitparade)	3
UK Singles (Official Charts)	1
US Billboard Hot 100	3
US Adult Contemporary (Billboard)	9
US Cash Box Top 100	5
West Germany (GfK)	3

=== Year-end charts ===
Annual chart rankings for "Take a Chance on Me"
Chart (1978)	Position
Australia (Kent Music Report)	109
Austria (Ö3 Austria Top 40)	7
Belgium (Ultratop 50 Flanders)	23
Canada Top Singles (RPM)	55
Germany (Official German Charts)	13
Netherlands (Dutch Top 40)	51
Netherlands (Single Top 100)	24
Switzerland (Schweizer Hitparade)	10
UK Singles (OCC)	9
US Billboard Hot 100	32

== Certifications and sales ==
Certifications and sales for "Take a Chance on Me"
Region	Certification	Certified units/sales
Canada (Music Canada)	Gold	75,000^{^}
Denmark (IFPI Danmark)	Gold	45,000^{‡}
Kenya	—	10,000
New Zealand (RMNZ)	2× Platinum	60,000^{‡}
Portugal	—	20,000
United Kingdom (BPI)	Platinum	600,000^{‡}
United States (RIAA)	Gold	1,000,000^{^}
United States Digital	—	234,000
Summaries
Worldwide physical sales	—	2,000,000
^{^} Shipments figures based on certification alone.^{‡} Sales+streaming figures based on certification alone.

== Erasure version ==
"Take a Chance on Me"

Single by Erasure

from the album Abba-esque
- Released: 1 June 1992
- Genre: Synth-pop; hi-NRG
- Length: 3:45; 3:26 (radio edit)
- Label: Mute
- Songwriters: Benny Andersson; Björn Ulvaeus
- Producer: Dave Bascombe

Erasure singles chronology
"Breath of Life" (1992)	"Take a Chance on Me" (1992)	"Who Needs Love Like That" (Hamburg Mix) (1992)

Music video
- "Take a Chance on Me" on YouTube

The track was covered by English synth-pop duo Erasure in June 1992, by Mute Records, as part of their Abba-esque EP Mute with an additional ragga-style toast performed by MC Kinky added to the song. In a few countries, the cover was credited to "Erasure featuring Special K", due to MC Kinky referring to herself as "Special K" during the ragga rap. It was produced by Dave Bascombe. In the United States, the song reached number 51 on the Billboard Hot 100 Airplay chart. Although it had earned enough charting points to reach the publication's main Hot 100 chart, it was not eligible to enter as it had not been released commercially as a single. The radio edit omits the ragga rap. The music video for the song was directed by Philippe Gautier, featuring the duo in drag as Fältskog and Lyngstad.

=== Critical reception ===
Larry Flick from Billboard magazine wrote, "Track maintains the cool kitsch of the original, while giving it electro-hip instrumentation and a jolting-but-pleasing toast interlude by MC Kinky. A must for adventurous popsters, while remixes have considerable club potential." Amy Linden from Entertainment Weekly found that Erasure "reverently tarts up" the song "as keyboard whiz Vince Clarke pumps the '70s gems full of '92 club aggression." She also stated that the duo "pay respect with a frothy testimonial that has its tongue in the right place." In a 2011 retrospective review, Tom Ewing of Freaky Trigger noted that the whole project "roars to life exactly once, when MC Kinky takes over for thirty delightful, crass seconds in the middle of 'Take a Chance on Me' and shows the song a little creative disrespect at last." Dave Sholin from the Gavin Report asked, "ABBA goes techno?", and concluded that this updated version "retains much of the flavor in the original with hip production elements added." Howard Cohen from Knight-Ridder Newspapers named it a "bouncy remake". Everett True from Melody Maker felt their cover of the song "bleeds. Seriously." David Quantick from NME noted its "sheer Swedishness".

=== Music video ===
Erasure members Vince Clarke and Andy Bell played dual roles – as themselves and in drag (Clarke as Fältskog and Bell as Lyngstad) – in a music video heavily influenced by ABBA's original. It was directed by Philippe Gautier. MC Kinky (aka. Caron Geary), who sings the reggae/dancehall rap part, also appears in an interlude in the video. Danny Scott from Select described the video as "uproarious".

=== Charts ===
Chart (1992)	Peak position
Ecuador (UPI)	10
Europe (European Dance Radio)	11
Iceland (Íslenski Listinn Topp 40)	14
US Radio Songs (Billboard)	51
US Dance Club Songs (Billboard)	10
