= ABBA: European & Australian Tour =

1977 concert tour by ABBA

- Tour by ABBA
- Poster to the concert in Hamburg, West Germany
- Associated albums: Greatest Hits; Arrival
- Start date: 28 January 1977
- End date: 12 March 1977
- Legs: 2
- No. of shows: 28

ABBA concert chronology
- European Tour 1974/1975 (1974–1975); European & Australian Tour (1977); North American & European Tour (1979–1980)

ABBA: European & Australian Tour, also known as ABBA: Live In Australia - 1977 and ABBA: Live 77, was the second concert tour by the Swedish pop group ABBA. Primarily visiting Europe and Australia during 1977, the tour supported the group's fourth studio album, Arrival (1976), and later their compilation Greatest Hits (1975-1976). The tour opened in Oslo, Norway, on 28 January 1977, and closed with two shows on 12 March 1977 in Perth, Australia, having performed 28 shows in 18 cities across 8 countries. It was ABBA's first international concert tour, and was documented on the concert film ABBA: The Movie (1977), filmed during the concerts in Australia.

== Set list ==
1. "Tiger" (with helicopter sound effect introduction)
2. "That's Me"
3. "Waterloo"
4. "SOS"
5. "Sitting In The Palmtree"
6. "Money, Money, Money"
7. "He Is Your Brother"
8. "I Do, I Do, I Do, I Do, I Do"
9. "Dum Dum Diddle"
10. "When I Kissed The Teacher"
11. "Knowing Me, Knowing You"
12. "Rock Me"
13. "I Am An A"
14. "I've Been Waiting For You"
15. "Mamma Mia"
16. "Fernando"
17. "Why Did It Have to Be Me"
18. "Intermezzo No. 1" (Instrumental interlude)

The Girl With The Golden Hair
- a mini musical -

  19. "Thank You for the Music"
  20. "I Wonder (Departure)"
  21. "I'm A Marionette"
  22. "Get On The Carousel"
23. "So Long"

Encore

24. "Dancing Queen"
25. "Thank You for the Music" (reprise)

Notes

- "So Long" was not performed at all European concerts. It was also not performed at the first Sydney concert on 3 March.
- Some Australian outdoor concerts replaced the helicopter introduction with a longer intro of "Tiger".
- At the first concert in Oslo on 28 January, ABBA performed the first verse of the song "Vi har ei tulle med öyne blå" acapella, in honor of the Norwegian royal couple, who was in the audience. Norwegian Crownprincess Sonja recorded this song in 1976.
- At the 5 and 6 March concerts in Melbourne, some songs were not performed due to band member Björn Ulvaeus not feeling fit. These are possibly: "Sitting In The Palmtree", "Rock Me" and "So Long". "Fernando" was performed after the mini-musical.

== Tour dates ==
Date	City	Country	Venue	Total Attendance / Total Capacity	References
Europe					
January 28, 1977	Oslo	Norway	Ekeberg Idrettshall	6,000 / 6,000	
January 29, 1977	Gothenburg	Sweden	Scandinavium	10,000 / 10,000	
January 30, 1977	Gothenburg	Sweden	Scandinavium	10,000 / 10,000	
January 31, 1977	Copenhagen	Denmark	Brøndby Hallen	4,500 / 4,500	
February 1, 1977	Copenhagen	Denmark	Brøndby Hallen	4,500 / 4,500	
February 2, 1977	Berlin	Germany	Deutschlandhalle	sold out	
February 3, 1977	Cologne	Germany	Sporthalle	sold out	
February 4, 1977	Amsterdam	The Netherlands	Jaap Edenhal	4,000 / 4,000	
February 5, 1977	Deurne, Antwerp	Belgium	Arenahal	—	
February 6, 1977	Essen	Germany	Grugahalle	—	
February 7, 1977	Hannover	Germany	Eilenriedehalle	sold out	
February 8, 1977	Hamburg	Germany	Congress Center Hamburg	sold out	
February 10, 1977	Birmingham	England	Birmingham Odeon	2,500 / 2,500	
February 11, 1977	Manchester	England	Free Trade Hall	—	
February 12, 1977	Glasgow	Scotland	Apollo Theatre	—	
February 14, 1977 (18:00)	London	England	Royal Albert Hall	5,600 / 5,600	
February 14, 1977 (21:00)	London	England	Royal Albert Hall	5,600 / 5,600	
Australia					
March 3, 1977	Sydney	Australia	Sydney Showground	20,000 / 20,000	
March 4, 1977	Sydney	Australia	Sydney Showground	20,000 / 20,000	
March 5, 1977	Melbourne	Australia	Sidney Myer Music Bowl	14,500 / 14,500	
March 6, 1977 (14:30)	Melbourne	Australia	Sidney Myer Music Bowl	14,500 / 14,500	
March 6, 1977 (20:30)	Melbourne	Australia	Sidney Myer Music Bowl	14,500 / 14,500	
March 8, 1977	Adelaide	Australia	West Lakes Football Stadium	21,000 / 21,000	
March 10, 1977 (18:00)	Perth	Australia	Perth Entertainment Centre	8,000 / 8,000	
March 10, 1977 (21:00)	Perth	Australia	Perth Entertainment Centre	8,000 / 8,000	
March 11, 1977	Perth	Australia	Perth Entertainment Centre	8,000 / 8,000	
March 12, 1977 (18:00)	Perth	Australia	Perth Entertainment Centre	8,000 / 8,000	
March 12, 1977 (21:00)	Perth	Australia	Perth Entertainment Centre	8,000 / 8,000	

== Broadcasts and recordings ==
One of the concerts at the Royal Albert Hall on 14 February was recorded on behalf of Atlantic Records. A 15-minute excerpt of this recording was said to get a digital release along with 2014's Live at Wembley Arena, but it ultimately was not.

"I Wonder (Departure)" (possibly recorded at the show in Sydney on 4 March) was released on 17 October 1977 as the B-side to "The Name Of The Game". This version featured heavy overdubs, and replaced the saxophone solo with a piano solo by Benny Andersson.

Excerpts of "Fernando" (Melbourne, 5 March), "Rock Me" (Sydney, 4 March), "Why Did It Have To Be Me" (Sydney, 3 March), "Money, Money, Money" (Sydney, 4 March) and "Waterloo" (Sydney, 4 March) were released on a promotional flexi-disc for Jultidningsförlaget.

"Fernando" and "Money, Money, Money" were released in 1986 on the live album ABBA Live.

Concert footage from the Australian leg of the tour was featured in the 1977 film ABBA: The Movie. It contains excerpts from: "He Is Your Brother" and "Why Did It Have To Be Me" (Sydney, 3 March), "Waterloo", "Money, Money, Money", "Rock Me" and "Intermezzo No. 1" (Sydney, 4 March), "Fernando" (Melbourne, 5 March), "Tiger", "SOS", "When I Kissed The Teacher", "I've Been Waiting For You", "Get On The Carousel" and "So Long" (Adelaide, 8 March). The dates for "Mamma Mia" and "I'm A Marionette" are unknown. "Knowing Me, Knowing You" from the 8 March Adelaide concert was also mixed for possible inclusion in the movie, but was ultimately not used.

== Personnel ==
=== ABBA ===
- Agnetha Fältskog – lead vocals
- Benny Andersson – piano, synthesizer, accordion, backing vocals, lead vocals on "I Am An A"
- Björn Ulvaeus – acoustic guitar, background vocals, lead vocals on "Sitting In The Palmtree", "Rock Me", "I Am An A" and "Why Did It Have To Be Me"
- Anni-Frid Lyngstad – lead vocals

=== The band ===
- Ola Brunkert – drums, percussion
- Malando Gassama – drums, percussion
- Anders Eljas – keyboards
- Wojciech Ernest – keyboards
- Rutger Gunnarson – bass guitar
- Lars O. Karlsson – saxophone, flute
- Ulf Andersson – saxophone, flute
- Finn Sjöberg – guitars
- Lasse Wellander – guitars
- Lena Andersson – backing vocals
- Lena-Maria Gårdenäs-Lawton – backing vocals
- Maritza Horn – backing vocals
- Francis Matthews – narrator "The Girl With The Golden Hair"

=== Management and technicians ===
- Claes Af Geijerstam – sound engineer
- Stikkan Anderson – manager
- Görel Johnsen – assistant to Stikkan Anderson
- Ingmarie Nilsson – wardrobe & make-up (Australia)
