= Mamma Mia! Here We Go Again: The Movie Soundtrack =

Soundtrack album by Mamma Mia! film cast
- Released: July 13, 2018
- Recorded: Mono Music Studio, Stockholm, Sweden; Riksmixningsverket, Stockholm, Sweden; Air Lyndhurst Studios, London, England
- Length: 67:38
- Labels: Capitol (US); Polydor (worldwide)
- Producers: Benny Andersson (also exec.); Björn Ulvaeus (exec.); Judy Craymer (exec.); Mark Taylor

Mamma Mia! film cast chronology
Mamma Mia! The Movie Soundtrack (2008)	Mamma Mia! Here We Go Again: The Movie Soundtrack (2018)

Singles from Mamma Mia! Here We Go Again: The Movie Soundtrack
- 1. "When I Kissed the Teacher" Released: May 8, 2018; 2. "Waterloo" Released: June 1, 2018; 3. "Fernando" Released: June 21, 2018; 4. "Dancing Queen" Released: July 21, 2018

Mamma Mia! Here We Go Again: The Movie Soundtrack is the soundtrack album for the 2018 musical film Mamma Mia! Here We Go Again. It is a follow-up to the 2008 film Mamma Mia!, which in turn is based on the 1999 West End/Broadway musical of the same name. It was released on July 13, 2018, by Capitol and Polydor Records in the United States and internationally, respectively. The album was produced by Benny Andersson, who also served as the album's executive producer alongside Björn Ulvaeus and Judy Craymer. Cher's vocals were produced by Mark Taylor, with her being the only singer on that album to have a different producer for the vocals. Commercially, the album has peaked at number three on the Billboard 200 and at number one in the United Kingdom, Ireland, Finland, Sweden, New Zealand, Australia, Austria, Greece and Scotland.

== Track listing ==
No.	Title	Writer(s)	Performer(s)	Length
1.	"When I Kissed the Teacher"	Benny Andersson; Björn Ulvaeus	Lily James; Jessica Keenan Wynn; Alexa Davies; Celia Imrie	3:02
2.	"I Wonder (Departure)"	Andersson; Ulvaeus; Stig Anderson	Lily James; Jessica Keenan Wynn; Alexa Davies	4:29
3.	"One of Us"	Andersson; Ulvaeus	Amanda Seyfried; Dominic Cooper	3:45
4.	"Waterloo"	Andersson; Ulvaeus; Anderson	Hugh Skinner; Lily James	2:48
5.	"Why Did It Have to Be Me?"	Andersson; Ulvaeus	Josh Dylan; Lily James; Hugh Skinner	3:19
6.	"I Have a Dream"	Andersson; Ulvaeus	Lily James	4:24
7.	"Kisses of Fire"	Andersson; Ulvaeus	Panos Mouzourakis; Jessica Keenan Wynn; Alexa Davies	2:30
8.	"Andante, Andante"	Andersson; Ulvaeus	Lily James	4:00
9.	"The Name of the Game"	Andersson; Ulvaeus; Anderson	Lily James	4:44
10.	"Knowing Me, Knowing You"	Andersson; Ulvaeus; Anderson	Jeremy Irvine; Lily James; Pierce Brosnan; Amanda Seyfried	3:44
11.	"Angel Eyes"	Andersson; Ulvaeus	Julie Walters; Christine Baranski; Amanda Seyfried	4:11
12.	"Mamma Mia"	Andersson; Ulvaeus; Anderson	Lily James; Jessica Keenan Wynn; Alexa Davies	2:39
13.	"Dancing Queen"	Andersson; Ulvaeus; Anderson	Pierce Brosnan; Christine Baranski; Julie Walters; Colin Firth; Stellan Skarsgård; Dominic Cooper; Amanda Seyfried	3:41
14.	"I've Been Waiting for You"	Andersson; Ulvaeus; Anderson	Amanda Seyfried; Christine Baranski; Julie Walters	3:17
15.	"Fernando"	Andersson; Ulvaeus; Anderson	Cher; Andy García	4:00
16.	"My Love, My Life"	Andersson; Ulvaeus; Anderson	Lily James; Meryl Streep; Amanda Seyfried	3:50
17.	"Super Trouper"	Andersson; Ulvaeus	Cher; Meryl Streep; Christine Baranski; Julie Walters; Dominic Cooper; Pierce Brosnan; Colin Firth; Stellan Skarsgård; Andy García; Josh Dylan; Jeremy Irvine; Hugh Skinner; Amanda Seyfried; Lily James; Jessica Keenan Wynn; Alexa Davies	3:51
18.	"The Day Before You Came"	Andersson; Ulvaeus	Meryl Streep	5:30
Total length:				67:38

== Commercial performance ==
In the United States, the soundtrack sold 19,000 copies in its first week of release and debuted at number 20 on the Billboard 200. In its second week, it ascended to number three with 48,000 album-equivalent units (including 34,000 pure album sales). In the United Kingdom, the album debuted at number four and rose to number one the following week, selling 35,000 copies to reach the top.

== Charts ==
=== Weekly charts ===
Chart (2018)	Peak position
Australian Albums (ARIA)	1
Austrian Albums (Ö3 Austria)	1
Belgian Albums (Ultratop Flanders)	2
Belgian Albums (Ultratop Wallonia)	6
Canadian Albums (Billboard)	4
Czech Albums (ČNS IFPI)	4
Danish Albums (Hitlisten)	5
Dutch Albums (Album Top 100)	3
Finnish Albums (Suomen virallinen lista)	1
French Albums (SNEP)	17
German Albums (Offizielle Top 100)	2
Greek Albums (IFPI)	1
Hungarian Albums (MAHASZ)	9
Irish Albums (Official Charts)	1
Italian Compilation Albums (FIMI)	3
Japan Hot Albums (Billboard Japan)	23
Japanese Albums (Oricon)	17
New Zealand Albums (RMNZ)	1
Norwegian Albums (VG-lista)	2
Polish Albums (ZPAV)	4
Portuguese Albums (AFP)	6
Scottish Albums (Official Charts)	1
Spanish Albums (PROMUSICAE)	3
Swedish Albums (Sverigetopplistan)	1
Swiss Albums (Schweizer Hitparade)	2
UK Albums (Official Charts)	1
UK Soundtrack Albums (Official Charts)	1
US Billboard 200	3
US Soundtrack Albums (Billboard)	1

=== Year-end charts ===
Chart (2018)	Position
Australian Albums (ARIA)	22
Austrian Albums (Ö3 Austria)	6
Belgian Albums (Ultratop Flanders)	30
Belgian Albums (Ultratop Wallonia)	146
Danish Albums (Hitlisten)	95
Dutch Albums (MegaCharts)	36
German Albums (Offizielle Top 100)	56
Irish Albums (IRMA)	6
New Zealand Albums (RMNZ)	20
Spanish Albums (PROMUSICAE)	81
Swiss Albums (Schweizer Hitparade)	32
UK Albums (OCC)	4
US Billboard 200	146
US Soundtrack Albums (Billboard)	7

Chart (2019)	Position
Belgian Albums (Ultratop Flanders)	142
Irish Albums (IRMA)	39
UK Albums (OCC)	39
US Soundtrack Albums (Billboard)	23

== Certifications ==
Region	Certification	Certified units/sales
Austria (IFPI Austria)	Platinum	15,000^{‡}
Denmark (IFPI Danmark)	Platinum	20,000^{‡}
New Zealand (RMNZ)	Platinum	15,000^{‡}
Poland (ZPAV)	Gold	10,000^{‡}
United Kingdom (BPI)	2× Platinum	600,000^{‡}
United States	—	275,000
^{‡} Sales+streaming figures based on certification alone.
