= ABBA: The Tour =

1979–80 concert tour by ABBA

- Tour by ABBA
- Promotional poster for the 1979 London concerts
- Associated albums: Voulez-Vous; Greatest Hits Vol. 2
- Start date: September 13, 1979
- End date: March 27, 1980
- Legs: 3
- No. of shows: 52

ABBA concert chronology
- European & Australian Tour (1977); ABBA: The Tour (1979–1980); ABBA Voyage (2022–2027)

ABBA: The Tour, later also labelled ABBA in Concert and ABBA: North American and European Tour 1979, was the third concert tour by the Swedish pop group ABBA. Primarily visiting North America, Europe and Asia during 1979–1980, the tour supported the group's sixth studio album, Voulez-Vous (1979), and later their compilation Greatest Hits Vol. 2 (1980). The tour opened in Edmonton, Canada, on September 13, 1979, and the tour closed in Tokyo, Japan, on March 27, 1980, having performed 52 shows in 40 cities across 13 countries. As it was the group's final tour before unofficially disbanding in late 1982, it included the largest catalogue of hit songs performed on any of their tours.

== Background ==
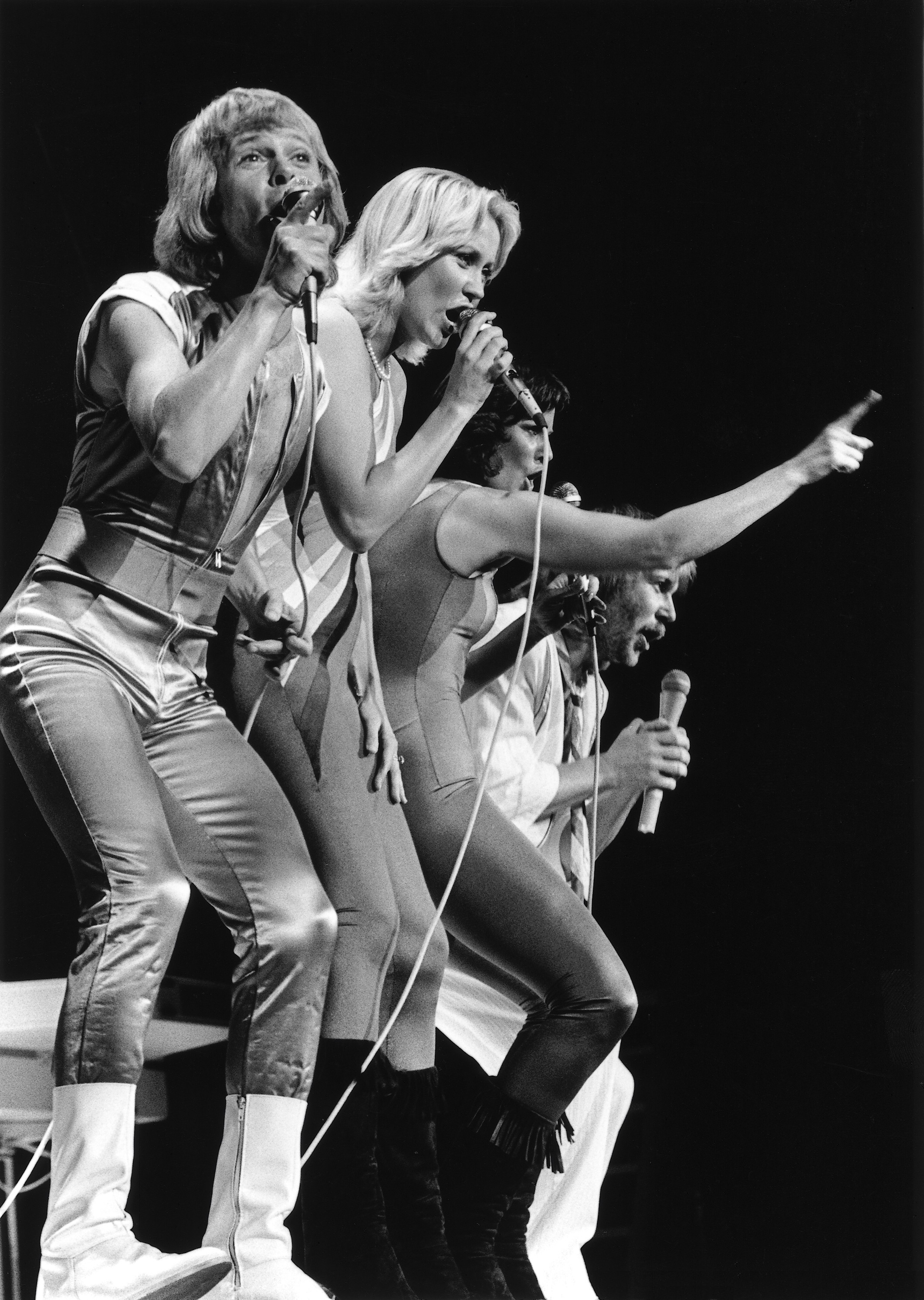
The first show of the tour at Northlands Coliseum in Edmonton, Alberta, Canada.

Since forming in 1972, the group had only performed sporadically over eight years. For many years, the group had refused to tour in the United States because they wanted to be the headliner and not the opening act. Pressured to tour by their record company, the group embarked on their brief European & Australian Tour during the summer of 1977.

Upon the release of Voulez-Vous, their sixth album, the group decided to tour North America for one month. Benny Andersson stated that the decision to tour was based on the need for the group to become more "present" to North American audiences. He further felt that the media would not consider ABBA to be a "real" group if they had not toured.

In January 1979, ABBA performed alongside Donna Summer the Bee Gees, Olivia Newton-John and Earth, Wind & Fire at the A Gift of Song—Music for UNICEF Concert at the United Nations General Assembly in New York City. The concert benefited the United Nations Children's Fund. Shortly after, it was revealed that members Björn Ulvaeus and Agnetha Fältskog had been separated for several months. Despite this, Agnetha assured the media that the group was united, stating, "Everyone feels very good at the moment. We are working well together and we still have something to give".

The tour was officially announced by WEA in May 1979, beginning in Canada and the United States before venturing into Europe. While promoting the album, the quartet began rehearsals for the tour in June 1979 at the Stockholm Concert Hall in Stockholm, Sweden. Agnetha and Anni-Frid began taking private vocal lessons while Benny and Björn organized the tour. In the United States, the tour was heavily promoted by various media outlets including Billboard magazine, where a 50-page mini-magazine about ABBA was included in its September 8, 1979, issue. The magazine provided a history of the group as well as outlining their success in over 40 countries worldwide. It also provided details of the upcoming tour, as well as personal interviews with each member of the quartet. During one of the interviews, Andersson and Ulvaeus remarked how important the tour was to the group, especially touring in new territory. They stated:

"To us, the U.S. is mainly a challenge. The whole tour to us is a great challenge. Tonight, the audience was great and everything went smoothly. But it was a very strange feeling when we have not toured in two and a half years. You don't have the self confidence that most artists have that tour a lot and you don't know until you're up there, until you meet the audience face-to-face, whether it's going to work or not..."

Nevertheless, the last scheduled ABBA concert in the United States in Washington, D.C., on October 4, was cancelled due to Fältskog's emotional distress suffered during the flight from New York to Boston, when the group's private plane was subjected to extreme weather conditions and was unable to land for an extended period.

Rehearsals of the tour continued when ABBA made a surprise appearance at a nightclub in Stockholm as a sneak peek for the upcoming tour. Andersson felt they needed to do this in order to build the self-confidence required to perform onstage in front of large audiences.

The group returned to rehearsals in August 1979 after promotions in the United States and Mexico ended. While rehearsing at the Europafilm Studios in Sundbyberg, Andersson and Ulvaeus needed to produce a song to help promote the tour. Together, they wrote "Gimme! Gimme! Gimme! (A Man After Midnight)".

The staging for the tour was a standard endstage with a blue backdrop with several triangular structures, resembling icebergs. It was on this tour that Fältskog and Lyngstad wore the iconic blue, indigo and violet jumpsuits. The suits were later recreated by Madonna on her Confessions Tour as a tribute to the band.

As the group toured the United States, their film ABBA: The Movie was shown in the city after each concert.

Despite critical acclaim, the band did not plan to tour again. Lyngstad stated that she felt secure onstage whereas Fältskog felt more comfortable in the recording studio. The group disliked the conditions of traveling for the tour, with one plane trip that was very traumatic for Fältskog. Their reactions to touring would later be penned in the song "Super Trouper" (1980). Many fans speculated the song was a long letter written to Ulvaeus' new lover—shown in the lines: "I was sick and tired of everything // When I called you last night from Glasgow // All I do is eat and sleep and sing // Wishing every show was the last show". However the song shifts viewpoint in the lines: "Facing 20,000 of your friends // How can anyone be so lonely // Part of a success that never ends // Still I'm thinking about you only".

== Critical response ==
Brian Brennan of the Calgary Herald was very impressed with ABBA's stage performance (given the fact that the group had not previously toured in North America) although he felt the concert was very tame compared to the group's popularity stating, "[...] marred by disappointingly poor sound quality, obviously fatal for any band that depends for impact on mastery of studio technology. During the first half, the performers lacked the supercharged vitality and provocative self-assurance normally associated with big-league artists. However, for cool professionalism, assembly-line precision and computer-perfect programming, the show functioned like a machine from start to finish."

== Broadcasts and recordings ==
=== Video recordings ===
The tour was showcased in the film, ABBA in Concert. The film captured ABBA's Wembley Arena November, 1979, concerts in London, England. ABBA in Concert originally aired on BBC and NBC television in 1980, then was released on VHS in 1980 and DVD in 2004. It features footage from "Waterloo", "Eagle", "Take A Chance On Me", "Voulez-Vous", "Chiquitita", "I Have A Dream", "Gimme! Gimme! Gimme! (A Man After Midnight)", "Knowing Me, Knowing You", "Summer Night City", "Dancing Queen", "Does Your Mother Know" and "Hole In Your Soul". "Gämmal Fabodpsalm" was used over the end credits.

The official videoclip for "I Have A Dream" features an extended version of the footage from the TV special.

In the US and Japan, "The Way Old Friends Do" was added to the first broadcasts of the TV special. This performance was also included in the "Words And Music" TV special from 1981.

For the release of the "ABBA In Concert" DVD in 2004, footage for "Thank You For The Music" was edited together and included as an extra.

The 2012 2-disc DVD "ABBA In Japan" includes a documentary of the Japanese leg of the tour, and features snippets of "Voulez-Vous", "If It Wasn't For The Nights", "As Good As New", "Not Bad At All", "Hole In Your Soul", "Dancing Queen", "Waterloo" and "I Have A Dream" recorded during the 1980 Japanese concerts. All sound was overdubbed with studio versions of the songs.

=== Audio recordings ===
In December 1979, BBC Radio 2 broadcast the one hour radio special "ABBA In Concert", featuring a selection of songs recorded at the Wembley concerts. Included were: "Gammal Fäbodpsalm / Voulez-Vous", "Knowing Me, Knowing You", "Chiquitita", "Gimme! Gimme! Gimme! (A Man After Midnight)", "I Have A Dream", "Thank You For The Music", "Summer Night City", "Take A Chance On Me", "Does Your Mother Know", "Hole In Your Soul", "Dancing Queen" and "Waterloo". A later 1981 Christmas Special added "The Name Of The Game / Eagle" and "The Way Old Friends Do".

This radio special was also the basis of the later 1986 "ABBA Live" LP/CD. This recording, engineered and mixed by Michael B. Tretow featured some of the songs from the radio special, with added songs from the 1977 tour and Dick Cavett Meets ABBA concerts. Also added to make it seem like all songs were recorded at the same concerts was fake applause, reverb to the vocals and very 1980's drums. Generally disliked by fans, this album was remastered in 1997, but later deleted from the official ABBA catalogue around 2001.

The live version of "Take A Chance On Me" was included as a B-side of the I Have A Dream single, released in December 1979.

"The Way Old Friends Do" was included as the final track of the 1980 LP Super Trouper.

The live version of "Hole In Your Soul", lifted from the ABBA In Concert TV-special soundtrack, was included on the compilation album Por Siempre..., released in Argentina by RCA Victor in 1982. The track had the somewhat confusing title "Debe Ser Rock And Roll (It's Gotta Be Rock & Roll) (Got A Hole In My Soul)".

The live version of "Summer Night City", lifted from the ABBA In Concert TV-special soundtrack, was included on the 1983 compilation album Äntligen Sommarlov!, released by Polar Music in Sweden on LP and cassette.

==== Live At Wembley Arena ====
In late 2013, Benny Andersson mentioned in an interview that a "new ABBA live at Wembley" album was on the way. In February 2014, he confirmed on Radio Sweden: "Universal will release a live album, which is the last concert at Wembley, that we did. Whenever it was. 79?. As it was. Nothing fixed. Just sort of... we mixed it and it will come out later this year".

On June 9, 2014, ABBA's official Facebook and Instagram accounts announced the release of Live at Wembley Arena. The 2 x CD and 3 x vinyl LP set includes the full concert (except for the Tomas Ledin song "Not Bad At All"), including Agnetha's performance of "I'm Still Alive" (which was only ever performed on this tour), which was released commercially for the first time. The next day on June 10, the full track list was revealed. It was released on September 29, September 26 in Australia and September 30 in the U.S. and Canada.

== Legacy ==
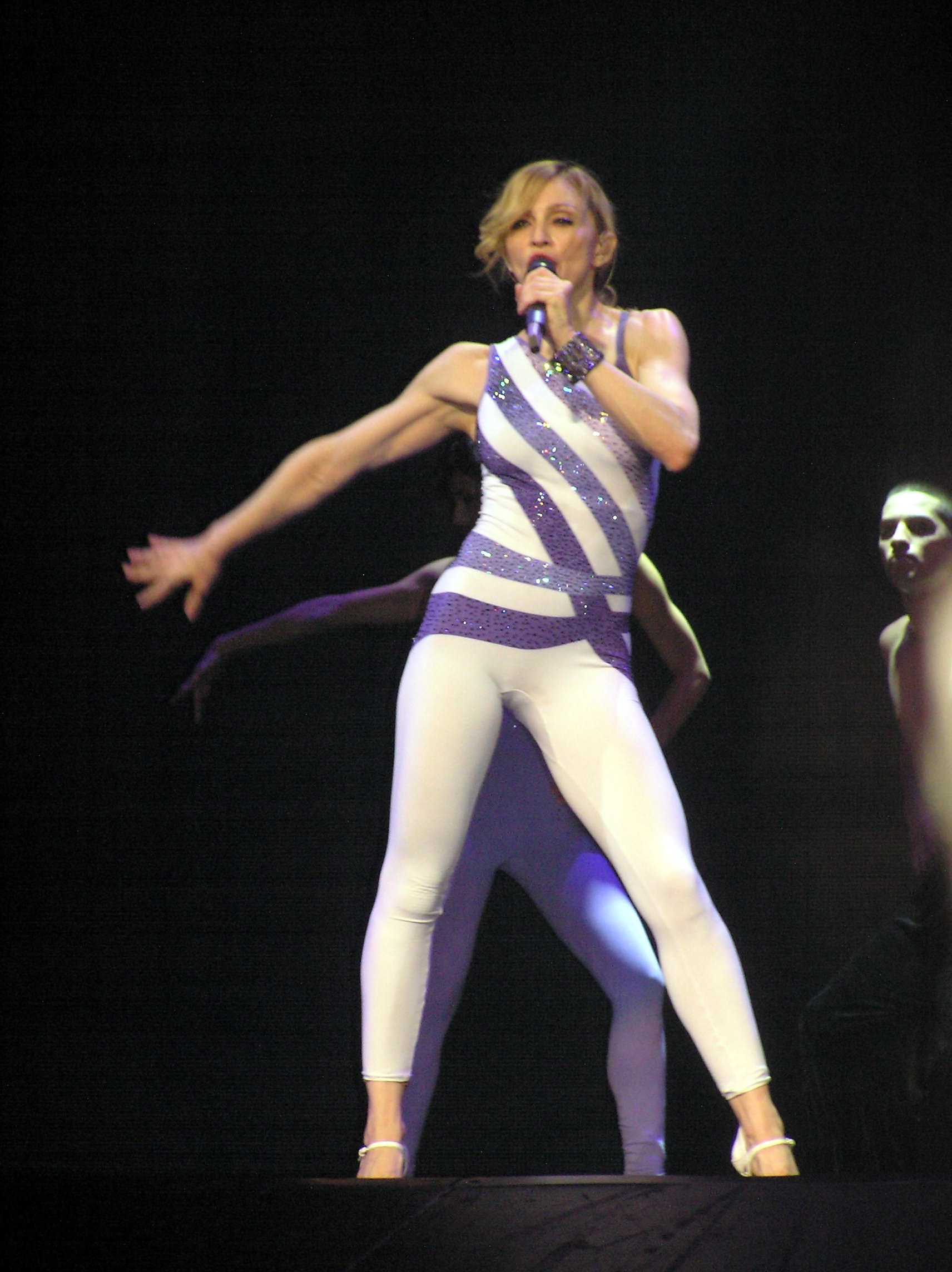
American artist Madonna performing during her Confessions Tour (2006), wearing her version of the jumpsuit wore by the band.

ABBA: The Tour is considered to be a classic among ABBA fans; many contemporary artists and ABBA tribute bands have included elements of this tour in their shows. Even though the ABBA members continued their musical careers as solo artists, they have not regrouped as ABBA for a concert tour. In 2006, the iconic blue, indigo and violet jumpsuits were recreated by Madonna on her Confessions Tour as a tribute to the band.

On October 1, 1983, as part of the World Music Day created by the International Music Council of UNESCO, the Swedish Posten AB released a set of five stamps commemorating music in Sweden. An image of ABBA, engraved by Czeslaw Slania from a photograph by Anders Hanser at the fourth concert of the tour (Portland Paramount Theatre), was immortalized on the pop music stamp in the Posten set. Other stamps showcased Swedish classical, opera, folk, and jazz performers.

The band did not perform live on stage after the tour. In 2021, they released Voyage. Rather than touring, the group re-recorded their vocals to be used in a virtual concert residency in London, ABBA Voyage, in which the band members appear as avatars accompanied by a live band.

== Set list ==
1. "Gammal Fäbodpsalm" (introduction)
2. "Voulez-Vous"
3. "If It Wasn't for the Nights"
4. "As Good as New"
5. "Knowing Me, Knowing You"
6. "Rock Me"
7. "Not Bad at All" (performed by Tomas Ledin)
8. "Chiquitita"
9. "Money, Money, Money"
10. "I Have a Dream"
11. "Gimme! Gimme! Gimme! (A Man After Midnight)"
12. "S.O.S."
13. "Fernando"
14. "The Name of the Game"
15. "Eagle"
16. "Thank You for the Music"
17. "Why Did It Have to Be Me"
18. "Intermezzo No. 1" (Instrumental interlude)
19. "I'm Still Alive"
20. "Summer Night City"
21. "Take a Chance on Me"
22. "Does Your Mother Know"
23. "Hole in Your Soul"

Encore

24. "The Way Old Friends Do"
25. "Dancing Queen"
26. "Waterloo"

Notes

- "One Man, One Woman" was performed at Northlands Coliseum in Edmonton, Alberta, Canada.
- "Not Bad at All" was performed by Tomas Ledin and the backing singers.
- "I Have a Dream" was performed along with a local children's choir in each city.
- "I'm Still Alive" was performed by Agnetha Fältskog at the piano.
- "Waterloo" was not included in the setlist until the Anaheim concert. It then disappeared until St. Paul and was performed through the end of the tour in Toronto.
- "The King Has Lost His Crown", "My Love, My Life" and "Mamma Mia" were part of rehearsals for the tour, but were eventually not included in the setlist.

== Tour dates ==
Date	City	Country	Venue	Total Attendance / Total Capacity	Revenue
North America
September 13, 1979	Edmonton	Canada	Northlands Coliseum	15,000 / 15,000	—
September 15, 1979	Vancouver	Canada	Pacific Coliseum	13,499 / 13,499	$125,387
September 17, 1979	Seattle	United States	Seattle Center Arena	5,000	—
September 18, 1979	Portland	United States	Paramount Theatre	2,776 / 2,776	—
September 19, 1979	Concord	United States	Concord Pavilion	8,096 / 8,096	$65,504
September 21, 1979	Anaheim	United States	ACC Arena	8,924 / 8,924	$67,068
September 22, 1979	San Diego	United States	San Diego Sports Arena	5,360 / 5,360	$45,789
September 23, 1979	Tempe	United States	ASU Activity Center	5,899 / 8,400	$47,599
September 24, 1979	Las Vegas	United States	Aladdin Theatre for the Performing Arts	5,000 / 5,000	—
September 26, 1979	Omaha	United States	Omaha Civic Auditorium	6,498 / 7,552	$58,870
September 27, 1979	Saint Paul	United States	St. Paul Civic Center	11,000	—
September 29, 1979	Milwaukee	United States	Milwaukee Auditorium	6,120 / 6,120	$50,585
September 30, 1979	Chicago	United States	Auditorium Theatre	3,982 / 3,982	$35,745
October 2, 1979	New York City	United States	Radio City Music Hall	6,015 / 6,015	—
October 3, 1979	Boston	United States	Music Hall	4,200 / 4,200	$34,006
October 6, 1979	Montreal	Canada	Montreal Forum	10,000	—
October 7, 1979	Toronto	Canada	Maple Leaf Gardens	16,400 / 16,400	$166,000
Europe					
October 19, 1979	Gothenburg	Sweden	Scandinavium	12,400 / 12,400	—
October 20, 1979	Stockholm	Sweden	Johanneshovs Isstadion	11,000 / 11,000	—
October 21, 1979	Copenhagen	Denmark	Falkoner Teatret	2,150 / 2,150	—
October 23, 1979	Paris	France	Pavillon de Paris	7,000 / 7,000	—
October 24, 1979	Rotterdam	Netherlands	Rotterdam Ahoy Sportpaleis	8,400 / 8,400	—
October 25, 1979	Dortmund	West Germany	Westfalenhallen	—	—
October 27, 1979	Munich	West Germany	Olympiahalle	—	—
October 28, 1979	Zürich	Switzerland	Hallenstadion	11,000 / 11,000	—
October 29, 1979	Vienna	Austria	Wiener Stadthalle	—	—
October 30, 1979	Böblingen	West Germany	Sporthalle	6,000 / 6,000	—
November 1, 1979	Bremen	West Germany	Stadthalle Bremen	—	—
November 2, 1979	Frankfurt	West Germany	Festhalle Frankfurt	—	—
November 3, 1979	Brussels	Belgium	Forest National	—	—
November 5, 1979	London	England	Wembley Arena	48,000 / 48,000	—
November 6, 1979	London	England	Wembley Arena	48,000 / 48,000	—
November 7, 1979	London	England	Wembley Arena	48,000 / 48,000	—
November 8, 1979	London	England	Wembley Arena	48,000 / 48,000	—
November 9, 1979	London	England	Wembley Arena	48,000 / 48,000	—
November 10, 1979	London	England	Wembley Arena	48,000 / 48,000	—
November 11, 1979	Stafford	England	Bingley Hall	15,000 / 15,000	—
November 12, 1979	Stafford	England	Bingley Hall	15,000 / 15,000	—
November 13, 1979	Glasgow	Scotland	The Apollo	3,500 / 3,500	—
November 15, 1979	Dublin	Ireland	RDS Main Hall	4,000 / 4,000	—
Asia					
March 12, 1980	Tokyo	Japan	Nippon Budokan	72,000 / 72,000	—
March 13, 1980	Tokyo	Japan	Nippon Budokan	72,000 / 72,000	—
March 14, 1980	Kōriyama	Japan	Sōgō Taiikukan	7,000 / 7,000	—
March 17, 1980	Tokyo	Japan	Nippon Budokan	—	—
March 18, 1980	Tokyo	Japan	Nippon Budokan	—	—
March 20, 1980	Fukuoka	Japan	Fukuoka Kyuden Kinen Gymnasium	2,000 / 2,000	—
March 21, 1980	Osaka	Japan	Festival Hall	5,400 / 5,400	—
March 22, 1980	Osaka	Japan	Festival Hall	5,400 / 5,400	—
March 24, 1980	Nagoya	Japan	Aichi Prefectural Gymnasium	4,400 / 4,400	—
March 26, 1980	Tokyo	Japan	Nippon Budokan	—	—
March 27, 1980	Tokyo	Japan	Nippon Budokan	—	—

Notes

- A concert at McNichols Arena in Denver was initially planned on September 25.
- The concert at Constitution Hall in Washington D.C. on October 4 was cancelled.
