= Number Ones (ABBA album) =

Compilation album by ABBA
- Released: 20 November 2006
- Recorded: March 1972 – November 1981
- Genre: Pop
- Length: 73:39
- Label: Polar
- Producers: Benny Andersson; Björn Ulvaeus

ABBA chronology
The Complete Studio Recordings (2005)	Number Ones (2006)	The Albums (2008)

Professional ratings
Review scores
Source	Rating
The Encyclopedia of Popular Music	4/5 stars

Number Ones is a compilation album of recordings by Swedish pop group ABBA, released by Polar Music in 2006.

Whereas ABBA Gold pulls together 19 of the group's biggest hits and most familiar songs, Number Ones is a variation on this concept, collecting 18 tracks that were #1 hits in many of the countries where ABBA were successful. In the end, only three tracks from ABBA Gold do not make the cut: "Does Your Mother Know", "Lay All Your Love on Me", and "Thank You for the Music".

In the UK, the track list includes the full length version of "Summer Night City" (originally released on the Thank You for the Music box set) and an additional track "Ring Ring", which, oddly enough, was never a big hit in that territory.

A limited edition, also released in the UK, includes a bonus disc with 12 tracks from ABBA's #1 albums.

In Taiwan, a hidden track follows "I Have a Dream". This hidden track, titled "ABBA Remix" and running for 3:31, is a medley of the choruses of the 18 songs on the CD.

== Track listing ==
=== International track listing ===
1. "Gimme! Gimme! Gimme! (A Man After Midnight)"
2. "Mamma Mia"
3. "Dancing Queen"
4. "Super Trouper"
5. "SOS"
6. "Summer Night City"
7. "Money, Money, Money"
8. "The Winner Takes It All"
9. "Chiquitita"
10. "One of Us"
11. "Knowing Me, Knowing You"
12. "Voulez-Vous"
13. "Fernando"
14. "Waterloo"
15. "The Name of the Game"
16. "I Do, I Do, I Do, I Do, I Do"
17. "Take a Chance on Me"
18. "I Have a Dream"

=== UK track listing ===
1. "Gimme! Gimme! Gimme! (A Man After Midnight)"
2. "Mamma Mia"
3. "Dancing Queen"
4. "Super Trouper"
5. "SOS"
6. "Summer Night City (Extended version)"
7. "Money, Money, Money"
8. "The Winner Takes It All"
9. "Chiquitita"
10. "One of Us"
11. "Knowing Me, Knowing You"
12. "Voulez-Vous"
13. "Fernando"
14. "Waterloo"
15. "Ring Ring"
16. "The Name of the Game"
17. "I Do, I Do, I Do, I Do, I Do"
18. "Take a Chance on Me"
19. "I Have a Dream"

=== Limited Edition Bonus Disc: Classic Tracks from Number Ones albums ===
1. "When I Kissed the Teacher"
2. "Hole in Your Soul"
3. "Dance (While the Music Still Goes On)"
4. "Me and I"
5. "The King Has Lost His Crown"
6. "Rock Me"
7. "Tiger"
8. "I Wonder (Departure)"
9. "Another Town, Another Train"
10. "Our Last Summer"
11. "Kisses of Fire"
12. "Slipping Through My Fingers"

== Personnel ==
- Agnetha Fältskog – lead vocals (1, 5, 8, 9, 10), co-lead vocals (2–3, 6, 12, 14–17), backing vocals
- Anni-Frid Lyngstad – lead vocals (4, 7, 11, 13, 18), co-lead vocals (2–3, 6, 12, 14–17), backing vocals
- Björn Ulvaeus – lead vocals (6), co-lead vocals acoustic guitar, backing vocals
- Benny Andersson – synthesizer, keyboards, backing vocals

== Charts ==
=== Weekly charts ===
Chart (2006)	Peak position
Belgian Albums (Ultratop Wallonia)	100
German Albums (Offizielle Top 100)	24
Scottish Albums (Official Charts)	21
UK Albums (Official Charts)	15
Chart (2007)	Peak position
Belgian Albums (Ultratop Flanders)	80
Dutch Albums (Album Top 100)	47
Finnish Albums (Suomen virallinen lista)	11
New Zealand Albums (RMNZ)	1
Polish Albums (ZPAV)	22
Swedish Albums (Sverigetopplistan)	20
Swiss Albums (Schweizer Hitparade)	53
Chart (2008)	Peak position
Australian Albums (ARIA)	36
Czech Albums (ČNS IFPI)	46
Hungarian Albums (MAHASZ)	27
Norwegian Albums (VG-lista)	25
US Top Catalog Albums (Billboard)	11

=== Year-end charts ===
Chart (2006)	Position
UK Albums (OCC)	158
Chart (2007)	Position
New Zealand Albums (RMNZ)	41

== Certifications ==
Region	Certification	Certified units/sales
Australia (ARIA) video	Platinum	15,000^{^}
Germany (BVMI)	Gold	100,000^{‡}
New Zealand (RMNZ) DVD	Gold	2,500^{^}
Poland (ZPAV)	Gold	10,000^{*}
Russia (NFPF)	Platinum	20,000^{*}
United Kingdom (BPI)	Gold	100,000^{^}
^{*} Sales figures based on certification alone.^{^} Shipments figures based on certification alone.^{‡} Sales+streaming figures based on certification alone.
