= Live at Wembley Arena =

Live album by ABBA
- Released: 26 September 2014
- Recorded: 10 November 1979
- Venue: Wembley Arena (London, England)
- Genre: Pop
- Length: 109:57
- Label: Polar; Universal
- Producer: Ludvig Andersson

ABBA chronology
The Essential Collection (2012)	Live at Wembley Arena (2014)	Voyage (2021)

Professional ratings
Review scores
Source	Rating
AllMusic	4/5 stars

Live at Wembley Arena is an album of live recordings by Swedish pop group ABBA, released by Polar Music on 26 September 2014, on 2 CD, 3 LP and digital format.

The album, produced by Ludvig Andersson, includes the complete concert at London's Wembley Arena (now The OVO Arena, Wembley) on 10 November 1979, the last of a six-night residency at the famous venue.

It features most of ABBA's hit singles and album favourites from their first eight years as a unit, as well as the never-before-released "I'm Still Alive", written by Agnetha Fältskog and Björn Ulvaeus.

== Overview ==
ABBA played to packed crowds at London's Wembley Arena from 5 to 10 November, as part of their North American and European Tour of 1979, also known as ABBA: The Tour. Band members Björn Ulvaeus and Agnetha Fältskog agreed that those concerts were the highlight of the world tour. Music stars such as The Clash's Joe Strummer and Ian Dury were among the audience.

Several songs from the Wembley concerts were filmed for the TV special ABBA in Concert, broadcast the following year. The song "The Way Old Friends Do", performed during the encore, resurfaced as the closing track of their 1980 album Super Trouper. Songs from Wembley also appeared on 1986's ABBA Live, but were overdubbed in the studio by producer and sound engineer Michael B. Tretow.

The BBC compiled its own one-hour version of the concerts and aired it on Christmas 1979. This circulates as a rare bootleg entitled "ABBA - Live In London".

In an interview with the webpage Ice the Site, in December 2013, songwriter and pianist Benny Andersson confirmed that a live album would be released "exactly as it was" sometime in 2014, as part of the band's 40th anniversary. Andersson detailed that his son Ludvig went through hours of tapes, choosing the right material. Ludvig selected the November 10th 1979 concert to be released. The decision was approved by all the members of ABBA, including Fältskog and Anni-Frid Lyngstad, who listened to it at a studio in Stockholm.

On June 9, 2014, ABBA's official Facebook and Instagram accounts confirmed the release. The next day, June 10, the full track list was revealed.

The album omits the song "Not Bad at All", performed on tour by backing vocalist and fellow Swedish pop singer Tomas Ledin.

== Track listing ==
All tracks written by Benny Andersson and Björn Ulvaeus except where noted.

Disc one
No.	Title	Writer(s)	Length
1.	"Gammal fäbodpsalm"	Traditional; Andersson^{[a]}	1:43
2.	"Voulez-Vous"		4:11
3.	"If It Wasn't for the Nights"		5:18
4.	"As Good As New"		3:26
5.	"Knowing Me, Knowing You"	Andersson; Stig Anderson; Ulvaeus	4:30
6.	"Rock Me"		3:34
7.	"Chiquitita"		5:34
8.	"Money, Money, Money"		3:57
9.	"I Have a Dream"		6:51
10.	"Gimme! Gimme! Gimme! (A Man After Midnight)"		5:34
11.	"SOS"	Andersson; Anderson; Ulvaeus	3:30
12.	"Fernando"	Andersson; Anderson; Ulvaeus	4:13
Total length:			52:21

Disc two
No.	Title	Writer(s)	Length
1.	"The Name of the Game"	Andersson; Anderson; Ulvaeus	3:09
2.	"Eagle"		6:10
3.	"Thank You for the Music"		3:52
4.	"Why Did It Have to Be Me?"		4:32
5.	"Intermezzo No. 1"		4:06
6.	"I'm Still Alive"	Agnetha Fältskog; Ulvaeus	4:29
7.	"Summer Night City"		5:28
8.	"Take a Chance on Me"		4:25
9.	"Does Your Mother Know"		3:58
10.	"Hole in Your Soul"		4:39
11.	"The Way Old Friends Do"		3:05
12.	"Dancing Queen"	Andersson; Anderson; Ulvaeus	5:52
13.	"Waterloo"	Andersson; Anderson; Ulvaeus	3:51
Total length:			57:36

Notes

- ^{^a} signifies arranged by

== Personnel ==
ABBA

- Agnetha Fältskog – vocals, keyboards
- Anni-Frid Lyngstad – vocals
- Björn Ulvaeus – acoustic guitars, vocals
- Benny Andersson – synthesizers, keyboards, accordion, vocals

Additional musicians

- Ola Brunkert – drums
- Anders Eljas – keyboards
- Rutger Gunnarsson – bass
- Mats Ronander – guitars
- Åke Sundqvist – percussion
- Lasse Wellander – guitars
- Tomas Ledin – backing vocals
- Birgitta Wollgård – backing vocals
- Liza Öhman – backing vocals
- Producer: Ludvig Andersson
- Engineer: Bernard Löhr (mixing), Filip Lindholm (assistant)
- Mastering: Björn Engelmann

== Charts ==
Chart (2014)	Peak position
Austrian Albums (Ö3 Austria)	9
Belgian Albums (Ultratop Flanders)	16
Belgian Albums (Ultratop Wallonia)	28
Danish Albums (Hitlisten)	16
Dutch Albums (Album Top 100)	12
Finnish Albums (Suomen virallinen lista)	50
French Albums (SNEP)	87
German Albums (Offizielle Top 100)	9
Scottish Albums (OCC)	29
Spanish Albums (PROMUSICAE)	63
Swedish Albums (Sverigetopplistan)	15
Swiss Albums (Schweizer Hitparade)	10
UK Albums (OCC)	30

== Certifications ==
Region	Certification	Certified units/sales
Sweden (GLF)	Platinum	40,000^{‡}
^{‡} Sales+streaming figures based on certification alone.
