= ABBA: The Movie =

1977 film by Lasse Hallström

- Theatrical release poster
- Directed by: Lasse Hallström
- Written by: Lasse Hallström; Robert Caswell
- Produced by: Stig Anderson; Reg Grundy
- Starring: Anni-Frid Lyngstad; Benny Andersson; Björn Ulvaeus; Agnetha Fältskog; Robert Hughes; Tom Oliver
- Cinematography: Jack Churchill; Paul Onorato
- Edited by: Lasse Hallström; Malou Hallström; Ulf Neidermar
- Music by: Stig Anderson; Benny Andersson; Björn Ulvaeus
- Production companies: Polar Music International; Reg Grundy Productions
- Distributed by: Svensk Filmindustri; Warner Bros. PolyGram Entertainment (UMG's Polydor Records)
- Release dates: 15 December 1977 (Australia); 26 December 1977 (Sweden); 2 February 1979 (United States)
- Running time: 96 minutes
- Countries: Sweden; Australia
- Languages: English; Swedish
- Box office: SEK 5.3 million

ABBA: The Movie is a 1977 mockumentary comedy-drama film about the 1977 Australian tour by the Swedish pop group ABBA. An international co-production between Sweden and Australia, the film was directed by Lasse Hallström, who previously helmed most of the band's videos. Its release coincided with ABBA: The Album, the group's fifth studio album, and features many songs from that album as well as many of their earlier hits, and one, "Get on the Carousel", unavailable anywhere else.

Theatrically released in December 1977 in Sweden and Australia, it made its way elsewhere in the world throughout 1978–79. The film was a box office success and received positive reviews from critics, while gaining an enthusiastic response from ABBA fans.

== Plot ==
Ashley Wallace is a naïve DJ on Radio 2TW, who normally presents a through-the-night country and western-themed show. In spite of this, he is sent by the station's boss to get an in-depth interview ("Not an interview, a dialogue", demands his boss) with the group, which is to be aired on the day ABBA leave Australia. Ashley, who has never done an interview before, fails, mainly because he has forgotten to pack his press card, although the fact that he is unable to buy a concert ticket doesn't help matters. Armed with his trusty reel-to-reel tape recorder, Ashley is forced to follow the group all over Australia, beginning in Sydney, and then travelling, in order, to Perth, Adelaide, and Melbourne, experiencing repeated run-ins with the group's very protective bodyguard, as well as his increasingly exasperated boss. Throughout the movie, Ashley is seen interviewing members of the public, asking them if and why they like ABBA. Almost all the comments are positive, but one man is driven mad by his ABBA-obsessed twelve-year-old son, and another girl thinks ABBA are over the top.

Eventually, Ashley has a lucky chance encounter with Stig Anderson, the group's manager, in the foyer of ABBA's hotel, who agrees to arrange an interview, and gives him tickets to that evening's concert. But Ashley sleeps in and misses the interview time. Just as he has given up hope, he finds himself face-to-face with ABBA in an elevator. They give him an interview there and then, and he leaves Melbourne just in time to meet the deadline for the radio show to go on-air. He puts together the final edit in the back of a taxi from the airport, as ABBA depart Australia for Europe. With only minutes to go, Ashley makes it back to the radio station where, having set the tape up on the studio's playback machine, he relaxes at his control desk to listen as the interview is broadcast.

== Cast ==
- Benny Andersson as himself
- Björn Ulvaeus as himself
- Agnetha Fältskog as herself
- Anni-Frid Lyngstad as herself
- Stig Anderson as himself
- Richard Norton as himself, bodyguard and fitness trainer (uncredited)
- Robert Hughes as Ashley Wallace
- Bruce Barry as radio station manager
- Tom Oliver as bodyguard/bartender/taxi driver

== Music ==
- The introductory bars of "Hole in Your Soul" accompany the opening credits, but the song itself does not feature further.
- "Tiger"
- "S.O.S."
- "Money, Money, Money"
- "He Is Your Brother"
- "Intermezzo No. 1"
- "Waterloo"
- "Mamma Mia"
- "Rock Me"
- "I've Been Waiting for You"
- "The Name of the Game"
- "Why Did It Have to Be Me?"
- "When I Kissed the Teacher"
- "Get on the Carousel"
- "I'm a Marionette"
- "Fernando"
- "Dancing Queen"
- "So Long"
- "Eagle"
- "Thank You for the Music"

A brief snatch of "Knowing Me, Knowing You" as well as "Dum Dum Diddle" is also heard while Ashley is stuck in a traffic jam; they're presumably coming from a nearby car radio.

"Ring Ring" is performed by the members of a girls' ballet class Ashley speaks to for the interview while they are practicing their routines (the ABBA version can be heard in the background, which the children are singing along to).

Other tracks include "Johan på Snippen" ("Johan Snippen") and "Polkan går" ("Polka goes"), both Swedish traditional songs played by Andersson on piano accordion, and the instrumental "Stoned".

The country/western track heard towards the beginning when Ashley is in the radio studio is an early 1970s Björn & Benny song, "Please Change Your Mind", performed by Nashville Train. The song was also recorded by this Swedish country band (several of the musicians are from ABBA's own studio band) and released on their 1977 album ABBA Our Way.

== Production ==
Hallström indicated that the script and plot concept was "conceived on the plane on the way to Australia". Initially, 16 mm film was to be used but producers upgraded the project to 35 mm Panavision technology.

Filming took place primarily in Australia, with some additional scenes filmed in ABBA's native Sweden (but still set in Australia). The sequences for the songs "Name of the Game", "Eagle" and "Thank You for the Music" were all filmed in Stockholm in June 1977, among the final work completed for the movie. During August and September 1977, overdubs were recorded for the live tracks.

== Release ==
ABBA: The Movie was first released in December 1977. The film was presented in several Eastern Bloc nations, including the Soviet Union where it was screened at two movie houses in Moscow. The film went on wide release in the USSR in 1982, where it became one of the hits of the year, gathering an audience of 33.2 million viewers.

A theatrical re-release occurred across Europe during July and August 2008 (around the time of the worldwide rollout of the ABBA-themed movie musical Mamma Mia!) in the UK, Ireland, the Netherlands, Norway, Germany and Austria.

On 17 and 19 September 2023, the film was re-released in cinemas for the group's 50th anniversary, its first wide release in Europe and in North and South America. However, Australia was excluded from this engagement, as lead actor Robert Hughes had gained notoriety in the country for being convicted of sexual offences against children in 2014.

=== Home media ===
To date, four home releases have been issued: a single-disc DVD, a two-disc, special-edition DVD, a single-disc Blu-ray, and a now-defunct single-disc HD DVD. All releases above feature a restored print with bonus material. The initial DVD, including digital restoration, was released by SBS in Australia on 2 October 2005.

== Reception ==
Margaret Geddes of Australian newspaper The Age concluded that the film was "slick, competent and even for the non-convert entertaining."

Keith Phipps of Rolling Stone said, "it's an act of brand extension, sure, but it's a lot more fun than the obligatory piece of product its title suggests", adding that it was ABBA's version of A Hard Day's Night.

In a 2012 review, Brian Orndorf writes "[the movie] is a strange hybrid of performance sequences, documentary footage, and staged shenanigans, yet it braids together wonderfully, creating a time capsule experience that's precious to any fan of ABBA".
