= I'm Still Alive =

I'm Still Alive may refer to:

- "I'm Still Alive" (TWiiNS song), Slovakian 2011 Eurovision song
- "I'm Still Alive", a 1979 ABBA song
- I'm Still Alive (film), a 1940 American film

== See also ==
- "Alive" (Pearl Jam song), a single from the 1991 album Ten
