= Arrival (ABBA album) =

Studio album by ABBA
- Released: 11 October 1976
- Recorded: 4 August 1975 – 18 September 1976
- Studios: Metronome, Stockholm, Sweden
- Genres: Pop; Eurodisco
- Length: 33:12
- Labels: Polar; Epic (1976 UK release)
- Producers: Benny Andersson; Björn Ulvaeus

ABBA chronology
Greatest Hits (1975)	Arrival (1976)	ABBA: The Album (1977)

Alternative cover
- French edition using the inner sleeve image

Singles from Arrival
- 1. "Dancing Queen" Released: 16 August 1976; 2. "Money, Money, Money" Released: 1 November 1976; 3. "Knowing Me, Knowing You" Released: 18 February 1977; 4. "That's Me" Released: 25 July 1977

Arrival is the fourth studio album by the Swedish pop group ABBA. It was originally released in Sweden on 11 October 1976 by Polar Records. It became one of ABBA's most successful albums to date, producing some of their biggest hits: "Dancing Queen", "Money, Money, Money" and "Knowing Me, Knowing You". The track "Fernando", which had been released as a single in March 1976, was included on the Australian and New Zealand versions of the album. Arrival was the best-selling album of 1977 in the United Kingdom and was certified gold by the Recording Industry Association of America.

In 2024, the album was selected for preservation in the United States National Recording Registry by the Library of Congress as being "culturally, historically, or aesthetically significant".

== Background and production ==
By the time ABBA began working on their fourth album in August 1975, they had achieved a modest level of success around the world. It was with Arrival however, that they would achieve global superstardom. Recording sessions began in August 1975 and continued until September 1976 at Metronome and Glen studios in Stockholm, Sweden.

The first song to enter the studio was a track called "Boogaloo" on 4 August. Taking inspiration from the current disco sound (and in particular George McCrae's "Rock Your Baby"), the backing track was laid down. The group knew that they had something big on their hands, as member Agnetha Fältskog remarked: "We knew immediately it was going to be massive". With re-written lyrics, the song became known as "Dancing Queen", and would go on to be ABBA's biggest ever hit. Work on the song continued intermittently until December 1975 due to the group's increasing commitments in the latter half of the year. This was a result of the sudden surge of popularity that they found in the United Kingdom and Australia. During this time they also recorded a song (in Swedish), "Fernando", for member Anni-Frid Lyngstad's solo album, Frida ensam.

In March 1976, "Fernando" was re-written with English lyrics and released as an ABBA single, becoming the group's biggest hit to date – hitting No.1 in many countries, including a 14-week stay at No.1 in Australia. It was featured as a brand new track on their Greatest Hits album which became the UK's biggest-selling album of the year. (In the Australian release of Arrival, "Fernando" was included between "Why Did It Have to Be Me" and "Tiger"). The next song they began working on, in late March, was "Knowing Me, Knowing You", which became another major hit worldwide. Member Benny Andersson has said that it is "one of our five best recordings".

By the end of April two other songs had been laid down: "That's Me" and "Why Did It Have to Be Me". The latter track was reworked into "Happy Hawaii" before being reverted to its original title, with new lyrics and vocals by Björn Ulvaeus ("Happy Hawaii" would later be released as a B-side). Similarly, "Money, Money, Money" was worked into "Gypsy Girl" and then reverted to its original title. The song was released as a single and became a major hit some months after the album's release.

In June 1976, a TV special dedicated to the group (entitled ABBA-dabba-dooo!!) was filmed. Around the same time, what was to become the album's opening track, "When I Kissed the Teacher", was recorded. By late July "Tiger" and "Dum Dum Diddle" were recorded, considered by biographer Carl Magnus Palm as the "complete antithesis" of each other,. Both Lyngstad and Ulvaeus have expressed dissatisfaction with "Dum Dum Diddle". In Ulvaeus own words, "I'd been working all night trying to come up with a decent lyric. And I thought, 'Well, I'd better take in something to prove that I've been working.' I showed them this song, thinking they'd say, 'Oh, no! We can't do that!'". "My Love My Life" was recorded next. Originally a more upbeat song titled "Monsieur Monsieur", it became a lush ballad with backing harmonies inspired by 10cc's hit "I'm Not in Love".

The final track to be recorded was an instrumental piece entitled "Ode to Dalecarlia". Mostly featuring Andersson on keyboards, the track was renamed to "Arrival" – a word that had already been decided as the title of their new album. By September 1976, work on the album was finished.

== Release ==
Arrival was released on 11 October 1976. The album was first released on compact disc (CD) in 1984 and then re-issued in digitally remastered form a total of four times; first in 1997, then in 2001, 2005 as part of The Complete Studio Recordings box set, and again in 2006 (as a special Deluxe Edition).

On 7 October 2016, the album was reissued for its 40th anniversary as a multi format release that included: a 45 rpm half-speed mastered double vinyl edition of the album, done by Abbey Road Studios on 12-inch black 180 g vinyl; a seven-inch box set of the singles "Dancing Queen", "Knowing Me, Knowing You", "Fernando" and "Money, Money, Money", pressed on colored vinyl; and 7" picture discs of each of these four singles. The liner notes on the double LP release featured new liner notes by Swedish journalist Jan Gradvall, who also conducted a new interview with Michael B. Tretow.

=== Deluxe edition ===
In 2006, Arrival was reissued as a deluxe edition CD/DVD set to celebrate the album's 30th anniversary. The first disc consisted of the original album, expanded with five bonus tracks. The DVD, along with the "International Sleeve Gallery" (comprising single and album sleeves from around the world), featured extra content from the Arrival era, including: the one-hour long 1976 ABBA-dabba-dooo!! special, made by producer Leonard Eek and reporter Per Falkman for SVT, in which the band perform twelve songs and where footage of Björn and Benny working in their Viggsö cottage is featured; a performance of "Dancing Queen" from a West German Musikladen special titled "The Best of ABBA"; an April 1976 performance of "Fernando" on Top of the Pops; a feature of ABBA's promotional visit to London, titled "ABBA in London" from Young Nation (November 1976); footage of the "Dancing Queen" recording session from Mr. Trendsetter, a 1975 Swedish documentary; a December news report from SVT's Rapport on ABBA's 1976 success; a cartoon version of "Happy Hawaii" by Fremantle Media; and two Arrival television commercials. The set also contained a 28-page booklet with an essay on the making of the album.

This was the first release from the ABBA Deluxe Edition album series.

== Album cover ==
The album cover shots were taken of the group posing in and out of a Bell 47 helicopter at the Barkarby Airport, northwest of Stockholm. The now-renowned "mirrored-B" copyrighted ABBA logo, an ambigram designed by Rune Söderqvist in 1976, was also premiered on this album cover.

== Critical reception ==
Professional ratings
Review scores
Source	Rating
AllMusic	4.5/5 stars
Blender	3/5 stars
The Encyclopedia of Popular Music	3/5 stars
Ondarock	7.5/10
Pitchfork	8.6/10
Q	4/5 stars
The Rolling Stone Album Guide	4/5 stars
Spin Alternative Record Guide	9/10
The Village Voice	C

Arrival received mixed reviews upon release. In a contemporary review for Rolling Stone, music critic Ken Tucker panned Arrival as "Muzak mesmerizing in its modality" and wrote, "By reducing their already vapid lyrics to utter irrelevance, lead singers Anni-Frid Lyngstad and Agnetha Fältskog are liberated to natter on in their shrill voices without regard to emotion or expression." Robert Christgau of The Village Voice gave the album a "C", indicating "a record of clear professionalism or barely discernible inspiration, but not both." Record Mirror gave the album a five-star review saying it was "their best yet" and singled out tracks "Arrival", "My Love My Life" and "Money Money Money" as being "excellent". It finishes saying that "all the songs are ace".

In a review upon the album's 2001 reissue by Universal Records, AllMusic editor Bruce Eder found the material "brilliant" and complimented the reissue's "upgraded sound" as well as "those dramatic musical effects that this group played for maximum effect, which gave their music a raw power that their detractors usually overlooked; in the new edition, it's impossible to ignore." In The New Rolling Stone Album Guide (2004), music journalist Arion Berger recommended its Universal reissue to consumers.

== Commercial performance and legacy ==
The album became a major seller all over the world, becoming the top-selling album of 1977 in both the UK and West Germany, among others. It had three of ABBA's biggest hits – "Dancing Queen," "Money Money Money" and "Knowing Me, Knowing You" – and in some territories a fourth with the inclusion of "Fernando" (which had featured in most markets on their earlier Greatest Hits compilation). "That's Me" was released as a single in Japan only.

Arrival was included in Robert Dimery's 1001 Albums You Must Hear Before You Die; the album re-entered the UK album charts at #94 for the week of August 3, 2018, for the first time since 1979.

== Track listing ==
The information has been adapted from the official ABBA website. All tracks are written by Benny Andersson and Björn Ulvaeus, except where noted.

Side one
No.	Title	Writer(s)	Length
1.	"When I Kissed the Teacher"		3:00
2.	"Dancing Queen"	Andersson; Stig Anderson; Ulvaeus	3:50
3.	"My Love, My Life"	Andersson; Anderson; Ulvaeus	3:52
4.	"Dum Dum Diddle"		2:53
5.	"Knowing Me, Knowing You"	Andersson; Anderson; Ulvaeus	4:02

Side two
No.	Title	Writer(s)	Length
1.	"Money, Money, Money"		3:05
2.	"That's Me"	Andersson; Anderson; Ulvaeus	3:15
3.	"Why Did It Have to Be Me?"		3:20
4.	"Tiger"		2:55
5.	"Arrival" (instrumental)		3:00
Total length:			33:12

Notes

- "Fernando" was included in the track listing for the Australian and New Zealand releases of the original album. It was placed between "Why Did It Have to Be Me?" and "Tiger", adding more than 4 minutes of playtime to Side two.

=== Deluxe edition ===
Released for the album's 30th anniversary. The information has been adapted from the official ABBA website. All tracks are written by Benny Andersson, Björn Ulvaeus, and Stig Anderson, except where noted.

Bonus tracks
No.	Title	Writer(s)	Length
1.	"Fernando"		4:12
2.	"Happy Hawaii" (B-side of "Knowing Me, Knowing You")		4:25
3.	"Fernando" (Spanish version)	Andersson; Anderson; Ulvaeus; Buddy McCluskey; Mary McCluskey	4:17
4.	"La reina del baile" (Spanish version of "Dancing Queen")	Andersson; Anderson; Ulvaeus; B. McCluskey; M. McCluskey	4:04
5.	"Conociéndome, conociéndote" (Spanish version of "Knowing Me, Knowing You")	Andersson; Anderson; Ulvaeus; B. McCluskey; M. McCluskey	4:04
6.	"Fernando" (Frida's Swedish solo version; from Frida ensam)		4:14

== Personnel ==
Adapted from the original album's liner notes.

ABBA

- Agnetha Fältskog – lead vocals (1, 3), co-lead vocals (2, 4, 7–9), backing vocals
- Anni-Frid Lyngstad – lead vocals (5, 6), co-lead vocals (2, 4, 7–9), backing vocals
- Björn Ulvaeus – acoustic guitar, electric guitar, lead vocals (8), backing vocals
- Benny Andersson – synthesizers, marimbas, chimes, accordions, pianos, backing vocals

Additional musicians

- Rutger Gunnarsson – bass guitar
- Ola Brunkert – drums
- Roger Palm – drums (2)
- Malando Gassama – percussion
- Janne Schaffer – electric guitar (3, 7, 8)
- Anders Glenmark – electric guitar (6)
- Lasse Wellander – electric guitar (5, 9), acoustic guitar (4)
- Lasse Carlsson – saxophone (8)

Production

- Benny Andersson; Björn Ulvaeus – producers, arrangers
- Michael B. Tretow – engineer
- Rutger Gunnarsson – string arrangements (3)
- Anders Dahl – string arrangements (10)
- Sven-Olof Walldoff – violin arrangements (2)
- Rune Söderqvist – cover layout and idea
- Ola Lager – cover layout and idea, photography

== Chart positions ==
=== Weekly charts ===
Initial weekly chart performance for Arrival
Chart (1976–77)	Peak position
Australian Albums (Kent Music Report)	1
Austrian Albums (Ö3 Austria)	12
Belgian Albums (Humo)	1
Canada Top Albums/CDs (RPM)	4
Danish Albums (Denmarks Radio)	1
Dutch Albums (Album Top 100)	1
Finnish Albums (Suomen virallinen lista)	2
French Albums (IFOP)	9
German Albums (Offizielle Top 100)	1
Italian Albums (Musica e dischi)	11
Japanese Albums (Oricon)	3
New Zealand Albums (RMNZ)	1
Norwegian Albums (VG-lista)	1
Swedish Albums (Sverigetopplistan)	1
Swiss Albums (Musikmarkt)	5
UK Albums (Official Charts)	1
US Billboard 200	20
US Top 100 Albums (Cash Box)	43
US The Album Chart (Record World)	39

2000s weekly chart performance for Arrival
Chart (2006–2009)	Peak position
Dutch Albums (Album Top 100)	85
Finnish Albums (Suomen virallinen lista)	24

2010s weekly chart performance for Arrival
Chart (2018)	Peak position
UK Albums (Official Charts)	98
UK Album Downloads (Official Charts)	72

2020s weekly chart performance for Arrival
Chart (2021–2022)	Peak position
Belgian Albums (Ultratop Flanders)	109
Dutch Albums (Album Top 100)	67
Scottish Albums (Official Charts)	32
Swedish Albums (Sverigetopplistan)	13
UK Albums (Official Charts)	100
UK Album Downloads (Official Charts)	43

=== Monthly charts ===
Monthly chart performance for Arrival
Chart (1979)	Position
Soviet Albums (Moskovskij Komsomolets)	1

=== Year-end charts ===
1976 year-end chart performance for Arrival
Chart (1976)	Position
Australian Albums (Kent Music Report)	8
Dutch Albums (Album Top 100)	21
French Albums (IFOP)	47
New Zealand Albums (RMNZ)	5
UK Albums (OCC)	41

1977 year-end chart performance for Arrival
Chart (1977)	Position
Australian Albums (Kent Music Report)	17
Austrian Albums (Ö3 Austria)	17
Canada Top Albums/CDs (RPM)	27
Dutch Albums (Album Top 100)	6
German Albums (Offizielle Top 100)	1
Japanese Albums (Oricon)	37
New Zealand Albums (RMNZ)	11
UK Albums (OCC)	1
US Billboard 200	34

1978 year-end chart performance for Arrival
Chart (1978)	Position
Japanese Albums (Oricon)	28
UK Albums (OCC)	38

1979 year-end chart performance for Arrival
Chart (1979)	Position
Japanese Albums (Oricon)	8
Soviet Albums (Moskovskij Komsomolets)	1

1980 year-end chart performance for Arrival
Chart (1980)	Position
Soviet Albums (Moskovskij Komsomolets)	9

=== Decade-end charts ===
1970s decade-end chart performance for Arrival
Chart (1970–79)	Position
Japanese Albums (Oricon)	14
UK Albums (OCC)	7

== Certifications and sales ==
Region	Certification	Certified units/sales
Australia	—	960,000
Canada (Music Canada)	2× Platinum	200,000^{^}
Denmark (IFPI Danmark)	Gold	330,000
Denmark (IFPI Danmark) reissue	Platinum	20,000^{‡}
Finland (Musiikkituottajat)	Platinum	86,420
France	—	200,000
Germany (BVMI)	2× Platinum	1,000,000^{^}
Hong Kong (IFPI Hong Kong)	Gold	10,000^{*}
Ireland	—	150,000
Israel	Platinum	40,000
Japan (Oricon Charts)	—	645,000
Netherlands (NVPI)	Gold	500,000
New Zealand (RMNZ)	5× Platinum	75,000^{‡}
Norway (IFPI Norway)	Gold	167,000
Poland	—	800,000
Sweden	—	740,000
Taiwan	—	3,500
United Kingdom (BPI)	Platinum	1,700,000
United States (RIAA)	Gold	500,000^{^}
Yugoslavia	Platinum	70,000
^{*} Sales figures based on certification alone.^{^} Shipments figures based on certification alone.^{‡} Sales+streaming figures based on certification alone.

== Release history ==
Region	Date	Label	Format	Catalog	Reference
Scandinavia	11 October 1976	Polar	LP · cassette	POLS 272	
United Kingdom	5 November 1976	Epic	LP · cassette · 8-track cartridge	EPC 86018	
Australia	15 November 1976	RCA Victor	LP · cassette	VPL1-4034	

== See also ==
- List of best-selling albums in Australia
- List of best-selling albums in the Netherlands
