= Ljuva sextital =

Single by Brita Borg
- B-side: "Jan Öiwind Swahn"
- Released: March 1969
- Recorded: 5 March 1969
- Genre: schlager
- Label: Polar
- Songwriters: Benny Andersson; Stig Anderson; Björn Ulvaeus

"Ljuva sextital" is a song written by Benny Andersson, Stig "Stikkan" Anderson and Björn Ulvaeus, and originally recorded by Brita Borg, released it as a 1969 single with the song Jan Öiwind Swahn acting as B-side, and Sven-Olof Walldoff's band acting as musicians.

"Ljuva sextital" was recorded on 5 March 1969. This single was Borg’s first release on the Polar label, but her last single to chart in the Svensktoppen. With her recording, Brita Borg scored a Svensktoppen hit for 20 weeks between 1 June-12 October 1969, peaking at second position. In the same year, Borg recorded an album of compositions by Stig Andersson and released two singles with Rolf Bengtsson: “Lyssna Bara Till Ditt Unga Hjärta” and “Jo-Jo-Nä-Nä-Men” without any success.

Song lyrics describe the 1960s, which was soon about to end when the song was recorded, as well as looking ahead to circa 1990. While released before the first moon landing (July 1969), the song lyrics include references to the moonflights, which were planned as the Space Race was going on (the moon had been rounded by the United States with Apollo 8 spacecraft in December 1968, without landing). References had also been made to the sexual revolution.

Sven-Olof Walldoff's Band also recorded an own version, on their 1972 studio album Säj det med en sång.
