= Young Nation =

British television series

Young Nation was a TV segment of Nationwide which aired on the BBC during the mid-1970s. It often featured interviews with people of interest to the youth of the time. Its theme music, typical of the time, was a bouncy tune with high-pitched vocals by a female and a male (a clip of this was featured in the Sex Pistols—who recorded a segment of the show on 11 November 1976—documentary The Filth and the Fury). An excerpt from the program was seen on a bonus DVD that came with the 2006 re-issue of ABBA's Arrival album. According to a disclaimer at the start of the excerpt, the BBC no longer had the programme in their archives, and the clip was from the archive of ABBA's record label.
