= That's Me =

Single by ABBA

from the album Arrival
- A-side: "Dancing Queen"
- B-side: "Money, Money, Money"
- Released: July 1977 (Japan only)
- Recorded: March 24, 1976
- Studio: Metronome, Stockholm, Sweden
- Genre: Disco
- Length: 3:16
- Label: Polar Music
- Songwriters: Benny Andersson; Björn Ulvaeus; Stig Anderson
- Producers: Benny Andersson; Björn Ulvaeus

ABBA singles chronology
| "Knowing Me, Knowing You" (1977) | "That's Me" (1977) | "The Name of the Game" (1977) |

Music video
- "That's Me" on YouTube

"That's Me", originally "Coachman's Farm", is a song recorded by the Swedish pop group ABBA in 1976. It was released as a single in Japan, with "Money, Money, Money" as its B-side in July 1977, as the fourth and final single from the album Arrival. It reached number 75 on the official Japanese charts. Elsewhere, "That's Me" was used as the B-side to ABBA's hit single, "Dancing Queen".

A greatest hits compilation by vocalist Agnetha Fältskog, released internationally in 1998, was named after the song, one of her favourites recorded with the band.

== Music video ==
A music video was made for the song, which combined original footage, as well as clips and outtakes from previous ABBA "promo videos", and it debuted seventeen years after being actually filmed, as part of the More ABBA Gold video compilation in 1993.
