= Intermezzo No. 1 =

Instrumental by ABBA

from the album ABBA
- Released: 21 April 1975
- Recorded: 16 October 1974
- Genre: Progressive pop
- Length: 3:48
- Songwriters: Benny Andersson, Björn Ulvaeus
- Producers: Benny Andersson, Björn Ulvaeus

Audio video
- "Intermezzo No. 1" on YouTube

"Intermezzo No. 1" is an instrumental track from Swedish pop group ABBA's self-titled third album, released in April 1975. It was the first of only two tracks by the group not to contain lyrics; the other was the title track of their 1976 release, Arrival. It is the only purely instrumental ABBA song however, as "Arrival" includes "a static layer of rich harmony vocals". On the cover, the song is credited as "Intermezzo No.1 featuring Benny Andersson".

== Production ==
Written by Benny Andersson and Björn Ulvaeus, the orchestral rock tune was recorded on October 16, 1974, in Stockholm's Glen and Metronome Studios under the working title "Mama". Another working title for the song was Bach-låten (The Bach Tune). In September 1975, it was released as the B-side to ABBA's single, "Mamma Mia". Carl Magnus Palm describes it as a "showcase of Benny's classical music influences", which first began to appear in his work with The Hep Stars songs “Sunny Girl” and “Wedding”.

Carl Magnus Palm explains the song was a "popular feature on every subsequent ABBA tour" after the ABBA album was released. For example, the song is shown being performed in the 1977 concert tours in the film ABBA: The Movie.

== Composition ==
The song has a "piano and guitar-led instrumental". Many of ABBA's pieces are full of "thematic throwaways of the rich folk music culture [of Sweden]". This song is a "solo vehicle" in which to indulge in classical music. The grand piano is the central instrument, layered by a "flamboyant network of synth textures and brass punches". ABBA: Let The Music Speak explains "the main theme is inviting and uncomplicated, constantly giving way to a rapid-fire succession of mood-swinging secondary themes".

== Critical reception ==
Der Tagesspiegel says the song, "in contrast to the catchy masterpiece [Mamma Mia]" that it was coupled with on the single, "has a rather psychedelic-disturbing character". Elisabeth Vincentelli mentioned "Intermezzo No. 1" in passing, in the 33⅓ book ABBA Gold and describes it as among the "lackadaisical instrumentals ABBA threw about", while acknowledging that some "fans like the albums precisely for these oddities". John Tobler, writing in Abba – Uncensored on the Record describes the song as an "impressive instrumental".

Music historian Carl Magnus Palm describes the song as "show[ing] a sense of musical ambition" and an "opus" while remarking that "Intermezzo No. 1" "seem a little dated". Palm also observed that to some fans of the band, the song "probably remains a highlight in the ABBA oeuvre", while for the faction of its fans who prefer their mainstream songs considers it to have "aged less well". Christopher Patrick, writing in the book ABBA: Let The Music Speak, commented that "Intermezzo No. 1" is "whimsical and melodramatic" and "a sophisticated pastiche of all that is great and wondrous in the world of classical music, injected with a shot of late twentieth century pop enthusiasm".

== Sources ==
- Patrick, Christopher (2008). Tesch, Matthew (ed.). ABBA : let the music speak : an armchair guide to the musical soundscape of the Swedish supergroup (1st ed.). Fairfield Gardens, Qld.: Christopher J N Patrick. ISBN 978-0-646-49676-4.
- Palm, Carl Magnus (2005). ABBA: The Complete Guide to Their Music (PDF). Omnibus Press. ISBN 978-1-84449-505-4. Archived from the original (PDF) on 25 October 2021.
- Palm, Carl Magnus (1 September 2008). Bright Lights Dark Shadows: The Real Story of Abba. Omnibus Press. ISBN 978-1-84772-419-9.
- Tobler, John (4 January 2012). Abba – Uncensored on the Record. Coda Books. ISBN 978-1-908538-23-9.
- Vincentelli, Elisabeth (31 March 2004). Abba's Abba Gold. A&C Black. ISBN 978-0-8264-1546-2.
