= Super Trouper =

Super Trouper may refer to:

- Super Trouper (album), by the pop group ABBA
  - "Super Trouper" (song), from that same album
- "Super Trouper", a song by Deep Purple on the album Who Do We Think We Are
- Super Trouper (spotlight), a brand of spotlight

== See also ==
- Super Trooper, a fictional character in the G.I. Joe universe
- Super Troopers, a 2001 comedy film; or its 2018 sequel
