= My Love, My Life =

1976 song by ABBA

Song by ABBA

from the album Arrival
- Released: 11 October 1976
- Recorded: 20 August 1976
- Studio: Metronome, Stockholm, Sweden
- Length: 3:53
- Label: Polar
- Songwriters: Benny Andersson; Björn Ulvaeus; Stig Anderson
- Producers: Benny Andersson; Björn Ulvaeus

Audio video
- "My Love, My Life" on YouTube

"My Love, My Life" is a song recorded by ABBA for their album, Arrival. The song was written by Benny Andersson, Björn Ulvaeus and Stig Anderson.

== Background ==
"My Love, My Life" was one of the last songs to be recorded for the album. Agnetha Fältskog sings lead vocals and Ulvaeus proclaimed the song to be the finest example of Fältskog's vocal purity.. He also expressed reservations about how the song was arranged. A complete demo with the original "Monsieur, Monsieur" lyrics was recorded before this, and remains unreleased.

== Composition ==
According to the sheet music published at Sheetmusicdirect.com by Union Songs, "My Love, My Life" has a slow tempo of 68 beats per minute. Written in common time, the song is in the key of C major. Fältskog's vocal range spans from G_{3} to E_{5} during the song.

== Mamma Mia! Here We Go Again version ==
Lily James, Amanda Seyfried, and Meryl Streep recorded My Love, My Life for the soundtrack of Mamma Mia! Here We Go Again. Their version was released on 13 July 2018, alongside the rest of the soundtrack, by Capitol and Polydor Records. It was produced by Andersson and featured new lyrics written by Ulvaeus.

=== Charts ===
Chart (2018)	Peak position
Scotland Singles (OCC)	47

=== Certifications ===
Region	Certification	Certified units/sales
United Kingdom (BPI)	Silver	200,000^{‡}
^{‡} Sales+streaming figures based on certification alone.

== Cover versions ==
=== Elaine Paige version ===
"Like An Image Passing By"

Single by Elaine Paige
- B-side: "When Dreamers Close Their Eyes"
- Released: 1983
- Length: 3:42
- Label: Polar Epic Polydor
- Songwriter: Benny Andersson Björn Ulvaeus Stig Anderson
- Producer: Mike Batt

Elaine Paige singles chronology
"Be on Your Own" (1983)	"Like An Image Passing By" (1983)	"Sometimes (Theme from 'Champions')" (1984)

Elaine Paige recorded “ Like An Image Passing By” for the 1983 UK musical, ABBAcadabra, with reworked lyrics, produced and arranged by Mike Batt. The song was released as a single in Europe in late 1983 and early 1984. The B-Side consisted of a cover of “Like An Angel Passing Through My Room”, retitled "When Dreamers Close Their Eyes" sung by Finola Hughes. The single peaked at No. 126 in the UK Singles Charts.

Chart (1984)	Peak position
UK Singles Chart	126
