= Dum Dum Diddle =

Song by ABBA

from the album Arrival
- B-side: "Tiger"
- Genre: Pop, europop, disco
- Length: 2:53
- Label: Polar (Sweden); Epic (UK); Atlantic (US)
- Songwriters: Björn Ulvaeus; Benny Andersson
- Producers: Björn Ulvaeus; Benny Andersson

Audio video
- "Dum Dum Diddle" on YouTube

"Dum Dum Diddle" is a song by ABBA, released on their 1976 album Arrival. In 1977, it was released as a promo single in Argentina on the RCA label.

== Production ==
When asked how ABBA made "such a ridiculous and quite banal song [as Dum Dum Diddle] come alive," Björn Again founder Rod Leissle said, "I think ABBA had a special quality about them. They could put ridiculous lyrics into a song, and because they were fundamentally great songwriters they could make it work. A line like 'Dum Dum Diddle, to be your fiddle' doesn't really make a great deal of sense, but it still works because it's something you can sing along to and enjoy".

== Composition ==
"Dum Dum Diddle" is a folk-inspired pop song, featuring acoustic guitar from Lasse Wellander in the verses. Lead vocals are shared by Agnetha Fältskog and Anni-Frid Lyngstad. The song has a fiddle-style refrain (simulated by a synthesiser), which serves as its hook. It contains a "stream of strong melodies and instrumentation".

== Synopsis ==
The song is about a woman who quietly longs for the affections of a sad, lonely man who derives his only pleasure from constantly playing and practicing on his violin. The Guardian described it as "a song about a woman who feels sexually threatened by her partner's violin".

== Critical reception ==
Abba's Abba Gold suggests that ABBA criticised the song, but adds that the writers of the book like it. Abba - Uncensored on the Record said the "unfortunately titled song ... seemed like a reversion to Eurovision-style thinking". The complete New Zealand music charts, 1966-2006 describes the song as "rather silly but fun". Bright Lights Dark Shadows: The Real Story of Abba implied that Eagle was more lyrically ambitious than "the 'dum dum diddles' of ABBA's earlier work". The Los Angeles Times described the song as "cheery nonsense". The Scotsman implied that "Dum Dum Diddle" was a bad song by saying: "LIFE – to quote Toni Collette in Muriel's Wedding – can be 'as good as an Abba song' but the clunky transfer of Mamma Mia! from stage to screen proves that it can be just as awful as 'Dum Dum Diddle' too."
