= When I Kissed the Teacher =

- Brazilian EP cover, featuring "Money, Money, Money", "That's Me", and "Happy Hawaii"

Song by ABBA

from the album Arrival
- Released: 11 October 1976
- Recorded: 14 June 1976
- Genre: Pop; bubblegum pop
- Length: 3:01
- Label: Polar
- Songwriters: Björn Ulvaeus, Benny Andersson
- Producers: Björn Ulvaeus, Benny Andersson

Music video
- "When I Kissed the Teacher" on YouTube

"When I Kissed the Teacher" is a song by the pop band ABBA. It is the opening track on their 1976 album Arrival.

== Synopsis ==
The song's recording sessions began on 14 June 1976 with the name "Rio de Janeiro". Eventually, the track was renamed "When I Kissed the Teacher". The song's light-hearted lyrics tell the story of a student who has a crush on her teacher, one day cannot restrain herself and kisses him. The lyrics are set to spirited music. Benny Andersson considered this one of his favourite ABBA songs.

The video clip "goes from a female student longing for her teacher to her taking direct action by kissing him as he leans over her in class." The actor playing the part of the teacher was Magnus Härenstam.

== Release ==
The song was also released on the compilation album More Gold: More Hits and the video was included on The Definitive Collection.

== Composition ==
Lyrically and musically, the song is filled with "schoolgirl imagery". Agnetha Fältskog is the lead vocal.

== Critical reception ==
Buffalo News describes it as "bouncy". The Daily Telegraph lists the song as one of ABBA's hidden gems, offering it as an alternative to "Waterloo". It says the song "Starts off slow, but quickly turns into a surreal, pop homage to low level sexual harassment". Robert Hilburn of the Malaysian Star said "My nomination for the best ABBA track that wasn't a hit in the U.S.: "When I Kissed the Teacher", a zestful number that recalls the teen passion of such Phil Spector productions as the Ronettes' 'Be My Baby'". In a Voulez-Vous review, "When I Kissed the Teacher" is listed alongside "Dancing Queen" as an example of the group's "soaring female harmonies, uplifting melodies, and festive instrumental touches" in their earlier hits. Chris Jones of the Chicago Tribune, in a review of the Mamma Mia musical, noted "A soundtrack has become a discography. I've even almost forgotten my favorite ABBA ditty, 'When I Kissed the Teacher', just because it's not in the show." The Los Angeles Times said "'When I Kissed the Teacher' is the most convincing thing Abba has done because it injects some sly, mocking humor and passion that offsets the group seriousness". Abba – Uncensored on the Record cites the song as an example of what was "expected of ABBA". The Teacher in American Society: A Critical Anthology lists "When I Kissed the Teacher" with the Van Halen song "Hot for Teacher" and the Jethro Tull song "Teacher" as examples of "how teachers are viewed by [students] as sexual objects.

== Certifications ==
Certifications for "When I Kissed the Teacher" by ABBA
| Region | Certification | Certified units/sales |
|---|---|---|
| United Kingdom (BPI) | Silver | 200,000^{‡} |
^{‡} Sales+streaming figures based on certification alone.

== Mamma Mia! Here We Go Again version ==
Lily James, Jessica Keenan Wynn, Alexa Davies and Celia Imrie recorded When I Kissed the Teacher, with a slightly changed lyric, as the first single from the soundtrack of Mamma Mia! Here We Go Again. Their version was released on 8 May 2018 by Capitol and Polydor Records. It was produced by Benny Andersson, and Björn Ulvaeus plays one of the teachers in the clip.

=== Charts ===
| Chart (2018) | Peak position |
|---|---|
| Hungary (Single Top 40) | 15 |
| Ireland (IRMA) | 38 |
| New Zealand Hot Singles (RMNZ) | 17 |
| Scottish Singles Sales (Official Charts) | 31 |
| Sweden (Sverigetopplistan) | 78 |
| UK Singles (Official Charts) | 40 |

=== Certifications ===
Certifications for "When I Kissed the Teacher" by Lily James, Jessica Keenan Wynn, Alexa Davies, and Celia Imrie
| Region | Certification | Certified units/sales |
|---|---|---|
| New Zealand (RMNZ) | Gold | 15,000^{‡} |
| United Kingdom (BPI) | Gold | 400,000^{‡} |
^{‡} Sales+streaming figures based on certification alone.
