= Tiger (ABBA song) =

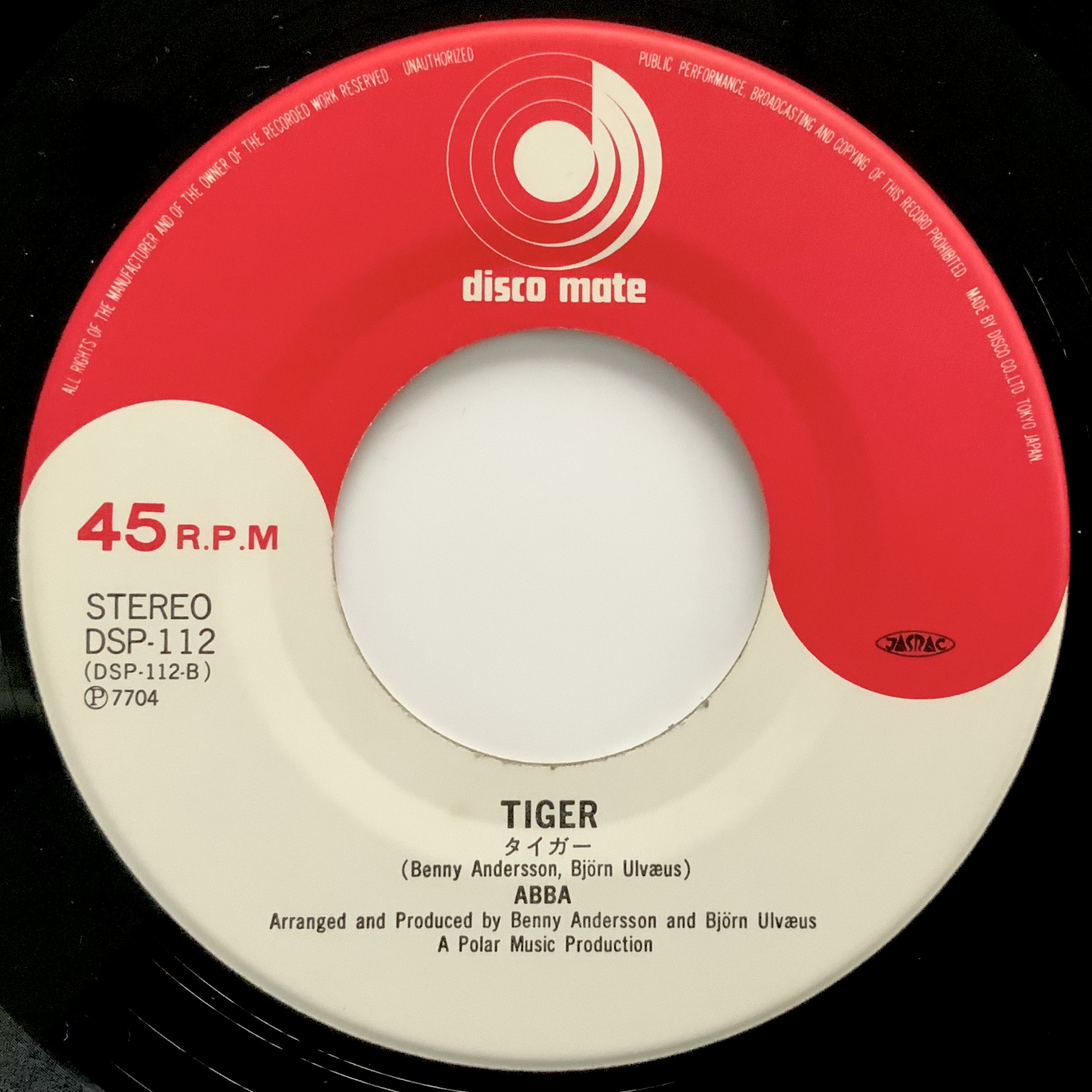

Song by ABBA

from the album Arrival
- Released: October 11, 1976
- Genre: Rock; pop
- Length: 2:55
- Label: Polar
- Songwriters: Björn Ulvaeus; Benny Andersson
- Producers: Björn Ulvaeus; Benny Andersson

Music video
- "Tiger" on YouTube

"Tiger" is a song by the Swedish pop band ABBA. The song was released on the 1976 album Arrival.

== History ==
"Tiger" is written from the perspective of a threatening entity warning the listener of the dangers of the city: "People who fear me never come near me, I am the tiger". The exact meaning behind "Tiger" is debated, although most speculators agree "tiger" is used as a metaphor for dangerous aspects of city life. Some hypothesize the tiger represents a stalker or serial killer, while others believe the tiger symbolizes the harmful nature of illicit drugs.

The vocals for the song were sung by Agnetha Fältskog and Anni-Frid Lyngstad.

== Performance ==
In the 1977 concert tours, the song was preceded by "the sound of helicopters booming over the speakers". ABBA also performed the song in the film ABBA: The Movie.

== Music video ==
The music video for "Tiger" features all four members of ABBA dressed in denim clothing riding in a Chevy at nighttime. It was aired on the "ABBA-Dabba-Dooo!" TV special.

== Critical reception ==
Bright lights, dark shadows: the real story of Abba described the song as "rocky". The Guardian described the song as "gripping".

== Legacy ==
The song is featured during the final scene transitioning into end credits in the 2025 film Dust Bunny by writer-director Bryan Fuller.
