= The Name of the Game (ABBA song) =

Single by ABBA

from the album The Album
- B-side: "I Wonder (Departure)" (Live version)
- Released: 17 October 1977 (SE); 14 October 1977 (UK)
- Recorded: 31 May 1977
- Studio: Marcus Music Studio, Bohus Studio
- Genre: Progressive pop; art pop
- Length: 4:51 (album version); 3:58 (US radio edit)
- Label: Polar
- Songwriters: Benny Andersson; Björn Ulvaeus; Stig Anderson
- Producers: Benny Andersson; Björn Ulvaeus

ABBA singles chronology
"That's Me" (1977)	"The Name of the Game" (1977)	"Take a Chance on Me" (1978)

Music video
- "The Name of the Game" on YouTube

"The Name of the Game" is a song by the Swedish recording group ABBA, taken from their fifth studio album The Album (1977). It was released on 14 October 1977 by Polar Music as the album's lead single. Benny Andersson and Björn Ulvaeus both wrote and produced the track, with Stig Anderson co-writing; this marked the last time Anderson co-wrote a single. Agnetha Fältskog and Anni-Frid Lyngstad both share lead vocals, but also have solo verses. The song was a notable departure for the group, featuring a more progressive and art pop song alongside the usual Europop influences. "Hole in Your Soul" was originally pegged as a single, but was later shelved in favor of "The Name of the Game". Ulvaeus remarked of how the group were initially worried about releasing the single due to its length.

The single received acclaim from music critics, and has continually been ranked as among ABBA's best songs. While not as successful as previous singles, "The Name of the Game" still proved a chart hit, topping the UK Singles Chart for a month, and also charting in the top ten across nearly all of Europe and Australasia. It also nearly became ABBA's third top ten single in the United States, stalling at number 12 on the Billboard Hot 100. The single has gone on to be certified Gold by the British Phonographic Industry for 500,000 certified units sold. It is included on ABBA Gold (1992).

== Background and release ==
"The Name of the Game" was the first song to be recorded for ABBA's fifth studio album, following their European and Australian tour. It was recorded at Marcus Music Studio in Solna, which had never been used by the group before. The song had the working title of "A Bit of Myself", and was one of their most complex compositions yet, being constructed in six separate parts that both Andersson and Ulvaeus would combine to create one, cohesive whole.

During this time as well, Andersson, Ulvaeus, and sound engineer Michael B. Tretow visited Los Angeles to check out equipment for their own purpose built studio. They would be inspired by the laid-back California sound of the time, as shown by artists like the Eagles and Fleetwood Mac, and it would come to fruition on this track. In addition, the bass-and-synthesizer riff opening the track was influenced by one of the group's favorite artists, Stevie Wonder, and his song "I Wish", taken from his 1976 album Songs in the Key of Life. Once the backing track was completed, the lyrics for the song were written, with the group's manager Stikkan Anderson contributing a new title, "The Name of the Game"; The Album would mark the final album Anderson co-wrote songs for ABBA, as afterwards every song recorded by the group was written solely by Andersson and Ulvaeus.

Agnetha Fältskog and Anni-Frid Lyngstad both share lead vocals, but in an atypical move each have their own verses, and "at one stage blending into a short a capella sequence of dreamlike, velvety smoothness." The two voices range from A3–C♯5 throughout the song, according to the official sheet music published by Musicnotes.com.

A preliminary version of "The Name of the Game" was worked into the 1977 feature film ABBA: The Movie, for which it was written. In the scene, radio DJ Ashley Wallace, portrayed by actor Robert Hughes, daydreams that he is a psychologist, with Fältskog as his patient.

In the autumn, the group began to choose which song they had recorded so far to release as a single. Initially, there were plans for the track "Hole in Your Soul" to be the lead single. In Australia, a catalog number was assigned by RCA Victor, the group's Australian distributor, and was announced as the group's forthcoming single. In the end, "The Name of the Game" was chosen, as it was seen as the superior song and recording. It was officially released on 14 October 1977, first in the United Kingdom via Epic Records, and then released three days later in Sweden by Polar Music. The B-side universally was a live recording of "I Wonder (Departure)", taken from a concert at the Sydney Showground in March 1977.

== Critical reception ==
"The Name of the Game" was critically acclaimed by music critics. Ian Birch of Melody Maker wrote positively of the single, complimenting its "polite disco bass-line," and that although it would not be a "Scandinavian classic, [...] it'll more than do." Barry Cain of Record Mirror distinguished the record as a "Class of their Own", describing it as "maybe the best thing they've ever done or ever will do." Billboard called "The Name of the Game" one of ABBA's "most stately, dramatic works to date." Cash Box said that "layers of acoustic guitars play a classic chord progression in the irresistable chorus." Record World said that "the emotion expressed is again secondary to the compelling nature of the music, as usual simple but dramatic."

Contemporary newspapers also show positive responses. Sports Argus commented the song was "not as instantly commercial as Dancing Queen, but it grows on you and cannot fail." North Wales Weekly News said "This single should go straight to Number One. It has great harmonies coupled with superb backing and production"

In 2017, Billboard ranked the song number six on their list of the 15 greatest ABBA songs, and in 2021, Rolling Stone ranked the song number three on their list of the 25 greatest ABBA songs.

== Commercial reception ==
In the United Kingdom, "The Name of the Game" debuted at number 20 on 22 October 1977, and shot to the number one spot on the UK singles chart. It stayed there for four consecutive weeks in total, the only country where the single reached the number one spot. It was the second of three consecutive UK No. 1 singles after "Knowing Me, Knowing You", and before "Take a Chance on Me". As of September 2021, it is ABBA's eighth-biggest song in the UK.

The song was a Top 5 hit in ABBA's native Sweden, Belgium, Finland, Ireland, the Netherlands, New Zealand, Norway, South Africa and Rhodesia, while peaking inside the Top 10 in Australia, West Germany, Switzerland and Mexico. On the US Billboard Hot 100, "The Name of the Game" almost reached the Top 10, peaking at No. 12 on 11–18 March 1978. In a radio poll hosted by ERT-Radio in Greece, listeners named it their third favorite international single of the year of 1977.

An edited version of "The Name of the Game", which omitted the entire second verse of the song, reducing the length of the track from its original 4:51 to 3:58, was released on a promotional single in the US. The US Promo Edit of "The Name of the Game" then – apparently by mistake – found its way onto the 1982 Polar Music compilation The Singles: The First Ten Years, and then onto a number of hits packages issued on both vinyl and CD in the 1980s and early 1990s. This edit also appears on the original 1992 version of the group's Gold: Greatest Hits album. Not until the 1999 remastered edition of Gold: Greatest Hits did the song appear in its entirety on that compilation.

When PolyGram released the first digitally remastered CD version of The Album in 1997, the fact that one of the nine tracks was nearly a minute shorter than it was supposed to be somehow managed to elude the remastering engineers – the US Promo Edit was again used by mistake and the first edition was subsequently withdrawn.

"The Name of the Game" was sampled in 1996 by the Fugees for their hit "Rumble in the Jungle", the first time that an ABBA song had been legally sampled by another act.

== Music video ==
Like most of ABBA's videos, the video was directed and shot by Lasse Hallström. During the video, the four members of the group are shown playing the board game "Fia-spel", the Scandinavian version of the German board game "Mensch ärgere dich nicht", which is a variation of the English board game Ludo and American Parcheesi.

== Charts ==
=== Weekly charts ===
Weekly chart performance for "The Name of the Game"
Chart (1977–1978)	Peak position
Australia (Kent Music Report)	6
Austria (Ö3 Austria Top 40)	12
Belgium (Ultratop 50 Flanders)	2
Belgium (Ultratop 50 Wallonia)	3
Canada (CRIA)	15
Canada Top Singles (RPM)	14
Canada Adult Contemporary (RPM)	12
Finland (Suomen virallinen lista)	5
France (French Singles Chart)	9
Ireland (IRMA)	2
Netherlands (Dutch Top 40)	2
Netherlands (Single Top 100)	2
New Zealand (Recorded Music NZ)	4
Norway (VG-lista)	3
Rhodesia (Rhodesian Singles Chart)	4
South Africa (Springbok Radio)	3
Sweden (Sverigetopplistan)	2
Switzerland (Schweizer Hitparade)	6
UK Singles (Official Charts)	1
US Billboard Hot 100	12
US Adult Contemporary (Billboard)	9
US Cash Box Top 100	16
West Germany (GfK)	7

=== Year-end charts ===
Annual chart rankings for "The Name of the Game"
Chart (1977)	Position
Belgium (Ultratop Flanders)	15
Netherlands (Dutch Top 40)	58
Netherlands (Single Top 100)	13
UK Singles (OCC)	16
Chart (1978)	Position
Australia (Kent Music Report)	84
Canada Top Singles (RPM)	96
US Billboard Hot 100	97

== Certifications and sales ==
Region	Certification	Certified units/sales
Sweden	—	140,000
United Kingdom (BPI)	Gold	500,000^{^}
^{^} Shipments figures based on certification alone.
