= Why Did It Have to Be Me? =

Song by ABBA

from the album Arrival
- Released: 11 October 1976
- Genre: Rock and roll
- Length: 3:20
- Label: Polar
- Songwriters: Björn Ulvaeus; Benny Andersson
- Producers: Björn Ulvaeus and Benny Andersson

Audio video
- "Why Did It Have To Be Me?" on YouTube

"Why Did It Have to Be Me?" is a song by the Swedish pop band ABBA. The song was released on the 1976 album Arrival. "Why Did It Have to Be Me?" has been called a "Fats Domino flavoured" song, and has been noted for its mix of blues, jazz, pop and rock stylings.

A live version of the song appears on the album Live at Wembley Arena.

== Background ==
"Why Did It Have To Be Me" was the final song to be completed for Arrival. Originally, the song "Happy Hawaii", which featured lead vocals by Agnetha Fältskog and Anni-Frid Lyngstad, was written for the album; however, this was discarded. A more country-styled track was then attempted, but it too was discarded. The song was then re-written and re-recorded, becoming "Why Did It Have To Be Me?", as a duet between Lyngstad and Björn Ulvaeus. "Happy Hawaii" was later released as the B-side to the hit single "Knowing Me, Knowing You", released in 1977 and as a bonus track on selected versions of the Arrival album.

== Reception ==
Pitchfork described the song as "Björn’s barroom boogie about a sap who loses his heart, all but one lap-steel and two fingers of whisky short of vintage Hank Williams" and notes the use of a male voice in the album, as it is the only song on the album featuring Ulvaeus on lead vocals. Similarly, Sputnikmusic notes the song as being "for the guys" and praises it as an example of the "professional songwriting" on the album.

== Mamma Mia! Here We Go Again version ==
Lily James, Josh Dylan and Hugh Skinner recorded a cover of "Why Did It Have to Be Me?" for the soundtrack of Mamma Mia! Here We Go Again. The version was released on 13 July 2018 alongside the rest of the soundtrack, by Capitol and Polydor Records. The song was produced by Benny Andersson.

=== Charts ===
Chart (2018)	Peak position
Ireland (IRMA)	41
New Zealand Hot Singles (RMNZ)	15
Scotland Singles (OCC)	35
Sweden Heatseeker (Sverigetopplistan)	15
UK Singles (OCC)	44

=== Certifications ===
Certifications for Why Did It Have to Be Me?
Region	Certification	Certified units/sales
United Kingdom (BPI)	Gold	400,000^{‡}
^{‡} Sales+streaming figures based on certification alone.
