= Knowing Me, Knowing You =

1977 song by ABBA

- Artwork for Scandinavian release, also used for other releases in different layouts

Single by ABBA

from the album Arrival
- B-side: "Happy Hawaii" (Early version of "Why Did It Have to Be Me?")
- Released: 18 February 1977
- Recorded: 23 March 1976
- Studio: Metronome, Stockholm, Sweden
- Genre: Pop; soft rock; disco
- Length: 4:00
- Label: Polar (Sweden); Epic (UK); Atlantic (US)
- Songwriters: Benny Andersson; Björn Ulvaeus; Stig Anderson
- Producers: Benny Andersson; Björn Ulvaeus

ABBA singles chronology
| "Money, Money, Money" (1976) | "Knowing Me, Knowing You" (1977) | "That's Me" (1977) |

Music video
- "Knowing Me, Knowing You" on YouTube

"Knowing Me, Knowing You" is a song recorded by Swedish pop music group ABBA, released on 18 February 1977 as the third single from the group's fourth studio album Arrival (1976). The pop and soft rock infused track was written by Benny Andersson, Björn Ulvaeus, and Stig Anderson, and produced by the former two. Featuring Anni-Frid Lyngstad on lead vocals, the track explores the end of a relationship. The B-side of the single was "Happy Hawaii", an early version of what would be the album track "Why Did It Have to Be Me?".

"Knowing Me, Knowing You" was both a critical and commercial success. Music critics praised it as a more mature step for the group both sonically and lyrically wise. The single topped the charts in Belgium, Ireland, South Africa, the United Kingdom (where it became their fifth number one hit on the UK singles chart), and West Germany, and entered the top ten in eight more. In the United States, it charted at number 14 on the Billboard Hot 100, becoming their sixth top-twenty hit.

Retrospectively, "Knowing Me, Knowing You" is ranked amongst critics as one of ABBA's best songs. The song is included on ABBA Gold (1992), and is featured in the Mamma Mia! musical and the film Mamma Mia! Here We Go Again. A Spanish version of the song, "Conociéndome, Conociéndote", was recorded in 1980, and is included on the compilations Gracias Por La Música (1980) and Oro: Grandes Éxitos (1993).

== Background ==
"Knowing Me, Knowing You" was recorded in 1976 at the Metronome Studios in Stockholm and was released as a single in February 1977, becoming one of the group's more successful hits. The B-side, "Happy Hawaii", was an early version of another ABBA song, "Why Did It Have to Be Me?", with a different lead vocalist and lyrics.

"Knowing Me, Knowing You" was one of the early ABBA songs to deal with the break-up of a relationship. It predates the divorces of the ABBA members as well as further break-up songs to come: "The Winner Takes It All", "One of Us" and "When All Is Said and Done".

"Conociéndome, Conociéndote" is the Spanish-language version of the song. It was included on the compilations Gracias Por La Música in 1980 Oro: Grandes Éxitos in 1993.

== Reception ==
=== Critical ===
Billboard reviewed the song and described it as a "melodically energetic but sad worded ditty about a romantic breakup." Cash Box called it "a softly rocking record that combines memorable pop hooks in their distinctive reverb-soaked ambiance" and said that it has "a sound agreeable to just about any top 40 station." Record World said that "Its chorus is a mighty hook, capping another superb melody." Caroline Coon for Melody Maker praised the single, noting that while not "as instant-hit sounding as most ABBA hot-shots [...] it grows on you [and it] will become one of their best-loved." Phil McNeill for NME wrote how "Ulvaeus and Andersson are masters of basics" with "a catchy tune, a clean sound and a few elegant flourishes on the harpsichord/backing whisper/reverbed piano."

=== Commercial ===
"Knowing Me, Knowing You" proved to be one of ABBA's more successful singles, hitting #1 in West Germany (ABBA's sixth consecutive chart-topper there and had sold over 300,000 copies there by September 1979), and the United Kingdom, Ireland, Mexico and South Africa, and reaching the top 3 in Austria, Belgium, the Netherlands and Switzerland. It was a top 10 hit in Australia, Canada, France, New Zealand and Norway.

In the United States, "Knowing Me, Knowing You" was released on 25 April 1977 via Atlantic Records. It became ABBA's sixth top 20 single, peaking at #14 on the Hot 100 and reaching #7 on Billboard's AC chart.

In the UK, "Knowing Me, Knowing You" was one of the biggest singles of 1977. It also began a second run of three consecutive #1 singles for ABBA (followed by "The Name of the Game" and "Take a Chance on Me"), the group having had three consecutive #1 hit singles in 1976. As of September 2021, it is the group's third-biggest song in the country with 1.02 million chart sales, made up of pure sales and streams.

"Knowing Me, Knowing You" continues to be regarded as one of ABBA's finest songs. In 2017, Billboard ranked the song number four on their list of the 15 greatest ABBA songs, and in 2021, Rolling Stone ranked the song number two on their list of the 25 greatest ABBA songs.

== Music video ==
The music video for "Knowing Me, Knowing You" depicts the band against various colored backdrops singing while facing each other, turning away as a new line is sung. At the end of the video, the band's female members are seen walking away through thick snow. The video was directed by future Academy Award nominee Lasse Hallström, as were most of their other videos.

== Track listing ==
| No. | Title | Writer(s) | Length |
|---|---|---|---|
| 1. | "Knowing Me, Knowing You" | Andersson; Anderson; Ulvaeus | 4:02 |
| 2. | "Happy Hawaii" | Anderson; Andersson; Ulvaeus | 4:26 |

== Personnel ==
- Anni-Frid Lyngstad – lead vocals
- Agnetha Fältskog – backing vocals
- Benny Andersson – keyboards, synthesizer
- Björn Ulvaeus – acoustic guitar, electric guitar, backing vocals
- Lasse Wellander – electric guitar
- Rutger Gunnarsson – bass, string arrangements
- Ola Brunkert – drums
- Malando Gassama – percussion

== Charts ==
=== Weekly charts ===
Weekly chart performance for "Knowing Me, Knowing You"
| Chart (1977) | Peak position |
|---|---|
| Australia (Kent Music Report) | 9 |
| Austria (Ö3 Austria Top 40) | 2 |
| Belgium (Ultratop 50 Flanders) | 2 |
| Belgium (Ultratop 50 Wallonia) | 1 |
| Canada (Steede Report) | 2 |
| Canada Top Singles (RPM) | 5 |
| Canada Adult Contemporary (RPM) | 6 |
| Europe (Europarade Singles) | 1 |
| Finland (Suomen virallinen lista) | 7 |
| Ireland (IRMA) | 1 |
| Netherlands (Dutch Top 40) | 3 |
| Netherlands (Single Top 100) | 2 |
| New Zealand (Recorded Music NZ) | 8 |
| Norway (VG-lista) | 6 |
| Rhodesia (Lyons Maid) | 11 |
| South Africa (Springbok Radio) | 1 |
| Switzerland (Schweizer Hitparade) | 3 |
| UK Singles (Official Charts) | 1 |
| US Billboard Hot 100 | 14 |
| US Adult Contemporary (Billboard) | 7 |
| US Cash Box Top 100 | 11 |
| US Adult Contemporary (Gavin Report) | 5 |
| US Pop/Adult (Radio & Records) | 5 |
| US Top-40 (Radio & Records) | 12 |
| US Record World Singles | 15 |
| West Germany (GfK) | 1 |

=== Year-end charts ===
Year-end chart performance for "Knowing Me, Knowing You"
| Chart (1977) | Rank |
|---|---|
| Australia (Kent Music Report) | 88 |
| Belgium (Ultratop Flanders) | 29 |
| Canada Top Singles (RPM) | 61 |
| Netherlands (Dutch Top 40) | 70 |
| Netherlands (Single Top 100) | 57 |
| Switzerland (Schweizer Hitparade) | 9 |
| UK Singles (OCC) | 6 |
| US Billboard Hot 100 | 97 |
| US Adult Contemporary (Billboard) | 37 |
| US Adult Contemporary (Gavin Report) | 35 |
| US Pop/Adult (Radio & Records) | 38 |
| West Germany (Official German Charts) | 9 |

== Certifications ==
Certifications for Knowing Me, Knowing You
| Region | Certification | Certified units/sales |
|---|---|---|
| Canada (Music Canada) | Gold | 75,000^{^} |
| Denmark (IFPI Danmark) | Gold | 45,000^{‡} |
| Germany | — | 300,000 |
| Kenya | — | 10,000 |
| New Zealand (RMNZ) | Platinum | 30,000^{‡} |
| Portugal | — | 20,000 |
| United Kingdom (BPI) | Platinum | 973,000 |
| Yugoslavia | — | 30,000 |
^{^} Shipments figures based on certification alone.^{‡} Sales+streaming figures based on certification alone.

== Release history ==
| Region | Date | Title | Label | Format | Catalog |
|---|---|---|---|---|---|
| Scandinavia | 18 Feb 1977 | "Knowing Me, Knowing You" / "Happy Hawaii" (Early Version Of "Why Did It Have To Be Me") | Polar | 7-inch vinyl | POS 1230 |
| UK, Ireland | 18 Feb 1977 | "Knowing Me, Knowing You" / "Happy Hawaii" (Early Version Of "Why Did It Have To Be Me") | Epic | 7-inch vinyl | S EPC 4955 |
| Austria, Germany, Netherlands, Portugal, Switzerland, Kenya | Feb 1977 | "Knowing Me, Knowing You" / "Happy Hawaii" (Early Version Of "Why Did It Have To Be Me") | Polydor | 7-inch vinyl | 2001 703 |
| Philippines | 1977 | "Knowing Me, Knowing You" / "Happy Hawaii" (Early Version Of "Why Did It Have To Be Me") | Polydor | 7-inch vinyl | PRO 3505 |
| France | 1977 | "Knowing Me, Knowing You" / "Happy Hawaii" (Early Version Of "Why Did It Have To Be Me") | Vogue | 7-inch vinyl | 45.X. 140 188 |
| Greece | 1977 | "Knowing Me, Knowing You" / "Happy Hawaii" (Early Version Of "Why Did It Have To Be Me") | Pan-Vox | 7-inch vinyl | PAN 7598 |
| Australia, New Zealand | 26 Feb 1977 | "Knowing Me, Knowing You" / "Happy Hawaii" (Early Version Of "Why Did It Have To Be Me") | RCA Victor | 7-inch vinyl | 102870 |
| Yugoslavia | 29 Mar 1977 | "Knowing Me, Knowing You" / "Happy Hawaii" (Early Version Of "Why Did It Have To Be Me") | PGP RTB | 7-inch vinyl | S 53979 |
| USA, Canada | 26 April 1977 | "Knowing Me, Knowing You" / "Happy Hawaii" (Early Version Of "Why Did It Have To Be Me") | Atlantic | 7-inch vinyl | 3387 |
| South Africa, Rhodesia | 1977 | "Knowing Me, Knowing You" / "Happy Hawaii" (Early Version Of "Why Did It Have To Be Me") | Sunshine | 7-inch vinyl | GBS 121 |
| Jamaica | 1977 | "Knowing Me, Knowing You" / "Happy Hawaii" (Early Version Of "Why Did It Have To Be Me") | Dynamic Sounds | 7-inch vinyl | D 111 |
| Bolivia | 1977 | "Knowing Me, Knowing You" / "Happy Hawaii" (Early Version Of "Why Did It Have To Be Me") | RCA | 7-inch vinyl | BOC/S - 1162 |
| Colombia | 1977 | "Knowing Me, Knowing You" / "Happy Hawaii" (Early Version Of "Why Did It Have To Be Me") | RCA | 7-inch vinyl | 05(3011)51928 |
| Peru | 1977 | "Knowing Me, Knowing You" / "Happy Hawaii" (Early Version Of "Why Did It Have To Be Me") | RCA | 7-inch vinyl | POS 1230 |
| Panama | 1977 | "Knowing Me, Knowing You" / "Happy Hawaii" (Early Version Of "Why Did It Have To Be Me") | RCA, RCA Victor | 7-inch vinyl | XAPBO-724 |
| Mexico | 1977 | "Knowing Me, Knowing You" / "Why Did It Have to Be Me?" | RCA Victor | 7-inch vinyl | SP-4785 |
| Venezuela | 1977 | "Knowing Me, Knowing You" / "Dum Dum Diddle" | RCA Victor | 7-inch vinyl | 45-736 |
| Spain | 1977 | "Knowing Me, Knowing You" / "Money, Money, Money" | Carnaby | 7-inch vinyl | MO 1669 |
| Hungary | 1977 | "Knowing Me, Knowing You" / "Money, Money, Money" | Pepita | 7-inch vinyl | SPSK 70261 |
| Brazil | 1977 | "Knowing Me, Knowing You" / "Money, Money, Money" | RCA | 7-inch vinyl | 101.8068 |
| El Salvador | 1977 | "Knowing Me, Knowing You" / "Money, Money, Money" | RCA, RCA Victor | 7-inch vinyl | CA-10053 |
| Europe | 2016 | "Knowing Me, Knowing You" / "Happy Hawaii" (Early Version Of "Why Did It Have To Be Me") | Polar | 7” vinyl, picture disc | 4795074 |

== Cover versions and appearances in other media ==
- Finnish eurodance act DCX recorded the song in 2007. Their single charted in fifth place in the Finnish charts.
- Brief clips from the original ABBA recording features in the film ABBA: The Movie (1977) when Ashley is stuck in a traffic jam; it is presumably coming from the radio of another car.
- The song is performed in the musical Mamma Mia! by the character of Sam. In the context of the musical, the song is used as Sam's description of his failed marriage.
- It is featured in the film adaptation's sequel, performed by younger versions of Sam (Jeremy Irvine) and Donna (Lily James), as well as the present-day Sam (Pierce Brosnan) and Sophie (Amanda Seyfried).
- Steve Coogan’s 1990s comedy radio show and TV series Knowing Me, Knowing You with Alan Partridge was named after the song. The song is also used as the theme tune.
