= Hole in Your Soul =

Song by ABBA

from the album The Album
- Released: 12 December 1977
- Genre: Rock 'n' roll
- Length: 3:41
- Label: Polar
- Songwriters: Benny Andersson & Björn Ulvaeus
- Producers: Benny Andersson & Björn Ulvaeus

Audio video
- "Hole in Your Soul" on YouTube

"Hole in Your Soul" is a rock 'n' roll song by ABBA, released on their 1977 album ABBA: The Album. The song was a reworking of "Get On The Carousel", a number featured in the mini-musical The Girl with the Golden Hair, written by the group for their 1977 concert tours.

== Production ==
=== Get on the Carousel ===
ABBA Gold explains "a good chunk of this The Girl With The Golden Hair number [Get on the Carousel] can be heard in the ABBA: The Album track Hole In Your Soul, though this is not obvious to everyone for example Abba - Uncensored on the Record which says the song "appears not to have been released on record by ABBA". It is essentially a reworking of that song.

The song was the final number in the musical, and according to Bright Lights Dark Shadows: The Real Story of Abba, was "all about shunning the music business that had made the girl [a star]". The song was dropped for the 1977 album because it was considered "too repetitive and inappropriate composition of a disc". The Digital Fix notes that while the song remains unreleased, it is "given a fair hearing in the concert footage" seen in the film ABBA: The Movie.

=== Later production ===
"Hole in Your Soul" had the working titles of "High on Your Love" and "Rock 'n' Roll". The song was recorded and mixed on August 3, 1977. During ABBA's 1979 concert tours, "the only times...that all four ABBA members were grouped together were during the songs "Hole in Your Soul" and "The Way Old Friends Do".

== Release ==
Bright Lights Dark Shadows: The Real Story of Abba said "the high energy level and direct approach of 'Hole In Your Soul' was very much in tune with the singles that had led to Abba's breakthrough in [Australia in] the first place", making it an "excellent choice for th[at] market". Singer Agnetha Fältskog's highest note in the song is a B5.

== Charts ==
Billboard explains that due to the rock song "Hole in Your Soul", ABBA: The Album was also a hit in the album-oriented rock market, with the song having "extensive FM play".

== Critical reception ==
Abba - Uncensored on the Record said the song "was another example of the group proving that they could still rock [in 1977]", and describes it as "exceptionally good" for its genre. It adds that "its use of Benny and Bjorn's vocal intermixed with Agnetha and Frida" is "simple but very effective [and] works very well." Abba's Abba Gold said the song had a "memorable — if utterly unconvincing — chorus". The Los Angeles Times said the song "shows the group can maneuver well" in a more rock-n-roll style song. The Sydney Morning Herald said the song "fairly gallops along", in the distinctive ABBA rock'n'roll style. The Register-Guard (Eugene, Oregon) says the song "gives all the singers a moment in the spotlight".
