= Lasse Wellander =

Swedish guitarist for ABBA (1952–2023)

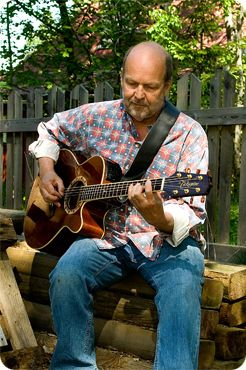
- Wellander in May 2012
- Born: 18 June 1952
- Died: 7 April 2023 (aged 70)
- Website: www.verywellander.se

Lars-Ove "Lasse" Wellander (18 June 1952 – 7 April 2023) was a Swedish guitarist, best known for his association with ABBA. He first recorded with the group's backing band in 1974, and played on all their studio albums from ABBA (1975) to Voyage (2021).

Wellander came from the village of Skrikarhyttan. His musical career began at the age of 16 when he joined Peps & Blues Quality, which without leader Peps Persson later became Nature. Subsequently, they were asked to become a backing band for Ted Gärdestad, who introduced Wellander to Björn Ulvaeus and Benny Andersson.

Speaking after Wellander's death, the members of ABBA commented: "The importance of his creative input in the recording studio as well as his rock solid guitar work on stage was immense".

== Awards and honors ==
- 2005 – Albin Hagström Memorial Award (Swedish: Albin Hagströms Minnespris)
- 2018 – Swedish Musicians' Union Studio Fox (Swedish: Studioräven) award

== Discography ==
=== Albums ===
- 1976 – Electrocuted
- 1978 – Wellander & Ronander
- 1985 – Full hand
- 1987 – Tweed
- 1990 – Poker-face
- 1992 – Från Rickfors till Peterson-Berger
- 2018 – 2017/2018

=== Singles ===
- 1992 – Vingar/Anthem
- 2017 – Samba Loelek
- 2017 – Out of the shadows
- 2017 – Fri som en fågel (m. Lena Larsson)
- 2017 – The Parting Glass
- 2018 – Old School Boogie
- 2018 – Ut mot öppet hav
- 2018 – In My Heart And Soul – instrumental version
- 2018 – In My Heart And Soul (m. Stefan Nykvist)
- 2018 – Postludium (m. Sophisticated Ladies)
- 2019 – Anitra's Dance (Anitras dans)
- 2020 – Mellan hägg och syren
- 2020 – Is There A Chance (m. Lena Larsson)
- 2021 – Guitarism (inkl. Radio Edit-version)
- 2021 – Nostalgia
- 2021 – O helga natt
- 2022 – Overdrive
- 2022 – Merry-Go-Round
- 2022 – Oh Come, All Ye Faithful
