= Stig Anderson =

Swedish music manager (1931–1997)

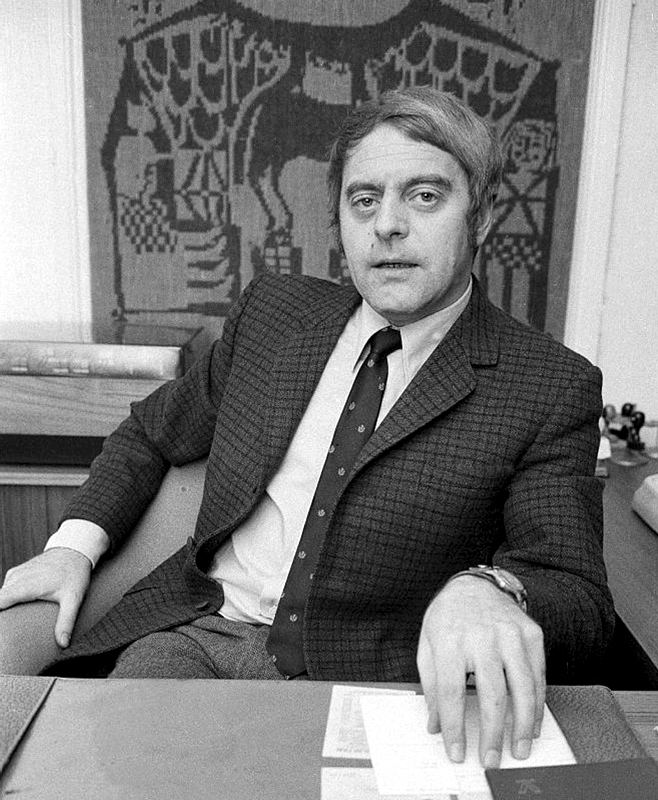
- Anderson in 1968

Background information
- Also known as: Stig Erik Leopold Anderson; Stikkan Anderson; Stikkan Erik Leopold Andersson
- Born: Stig Erik Leopold Anderson; 25 January 1931; Hova, Sweden
- Died: 12 September 1997 (aged 66) Stockholm, Sweden
- Genre: Pop
- Occupations: Music manager; entrepreneur; lyricist; music executive
- Years active: 1950s–1997
- Label: Polar Music

Stig Erik Leopold "Stikkan" Anderson (25 January 1931 – 12 September 1997) was a Swedish music manager, lyricist and music publisher. He was the co-founder of Polar Music and is best known for managing the Swedish pop band ABBA.

== Early life ==
Stikkan Erik Leopold Anderson was born on 25 January 1931 in Hova, Sweden, the son of a single mother named Ester. Anderson began his career as a chemistry and mathematics teacher at a primary school, by taking night classes after leaving school at the age of 15. Having written his first song at age 16, Anderson soon entered the Swedish popular music scene, becoming a music producer, manager and occasional performer.

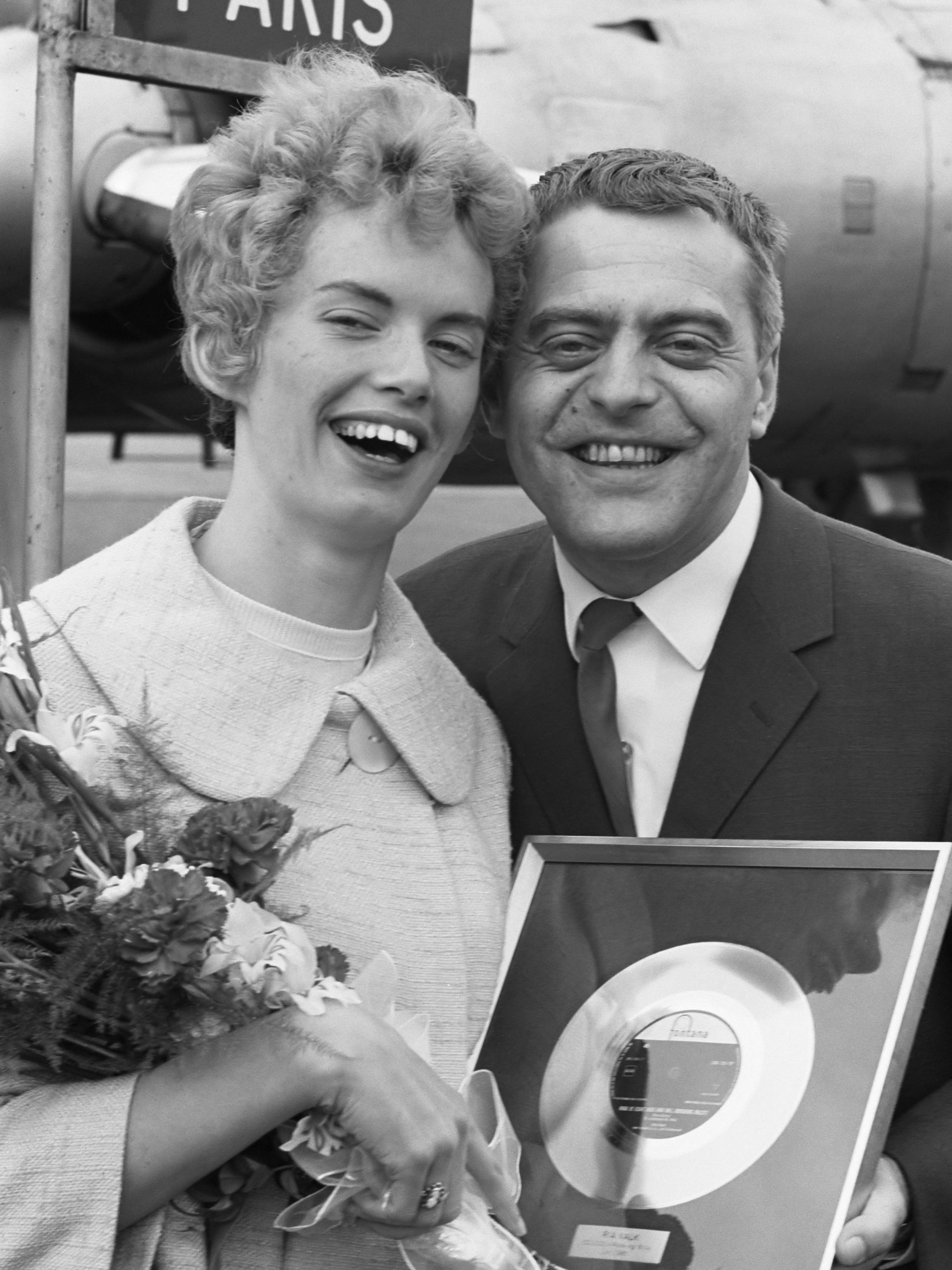
Stig Anderson and Dutch singer Ria Valk (1961)

Anderson began writing songs as early as 1951, and in 1959 gained his breakthrough with the song "Är du kär i mig ännu, Klas-Göran?" ("Are You Still in Love With Me, Klas-Göran?"), written for Swedish singer Lill-Babs. During the 1960s, he was one of Sweden's most prolific songwriters. According to Anton Stimm in the Swedish SVT documentary 'Stikkan' Stig Anderson wrote 767 published titles. Anderson also founded Sweden Music in 1960, as well as several other companies. Three years later, Anderson co-founded Polar Music with Bengt Bernhag.

== Management before ABBA ==
By the late 1960s, Anderson was the manager and producer of Björn Ulvaeus and Benny Andersson, who would become the two main songwriters of ABBA. He joined the careers of these two, after previously managing the Hootenanny Singers, of which Ulvaeus was a member. Later, in 1972, he began managing Anni-Frid Lyngstad, and finally in 1976 Agnetha Fältskog (until December 1975, Fältskog was still bound to Cupol/CBS Records under a contract).

Before his time with ABBA, Anderson managed some of the biggest Swedish artists at that time, and had a huge number of hits on the Swedish charts. His success earned him the nickname "The Business" since he often had several artists in the Top 10 at any time with whom he had written, published, and recorded the songs. When requiring fresh ideas, Anderson would travel to New York City, buy songs that had been American hits, and then translate or transcribe the lyrics on the return journey ready for a recording session shortly after and then have the record on the shelves within a few days. Some songs were sent to IFPI/ASCAP for copyright infringement.

For writing the Swedish lyrics to "Little Green Apples" ("Gröna små äpplen"), "Sadie (The Cleaning Lady)" ("Mamma är lik sin mamma") and "Ljuva sextital", Anderson was awarded Lyricist of the Year during the first Grammis Awards in 1969.

== ABBA ==
In the early years of ABBA's existence, Anderson co-wrote many of the songs' lyrics, among them some of the band's biggest hits, such as "Ring Ring" (1973), "Waterloo" (1974), "Honey, Honey" (1974), "I Do, I Do, I Do, I Do, I Do" (1975), "Mamma Mia" (1975), "S.O.S" (1975), "Dancing Queen" (1976), "Knowing Me, Knowing You" (1977) and "The Name of the Game" (1977).

Sometimes referred to as the "fifth member" of ABBA, Anderson also owned the band's record label and publishing company. He shared the ownership with Benny Andersson, Björn Ulvaeus and Michael B. Tretow, the main sound engineer for the company.

Anderson was one of the dominant figures behind ABBA, representing their commercial interests and global success through successful record deals. At the same time, he also managed the investment of funds and the enormous financial incomes of Polar Music, holding the majority of stocks. This was an agreement dating back to 1974, and a great deal of the money came from individual record deals he struck for the group, including a ground-breaking agreement for record sales in the Soviet Union in which ABBA recordings were released in exchange for barrels of oil. In the mid-1980s, a considerable part of ABBA's fortune was lost by mismanagement, bad investments, high demands for tax and the rise of credit rates.

=== Legal disputes ===
The contract with the performers, as well as the international distribution, ran from a standard publishing and recording deal involving identical contracts, rather than from one written specifically with the performers of the band. This led to problems later, when three of the four ABBA members terminated their relationship with Anderson when it was revealed that Anderson had used this contract to take a percentage of profits at a value of 4.5 million euros over the course of many years. A complaint against Anderson was submitted to the Stockholm District Court in June 1990 by Agnetha Fältskog's company Agnetha Fältskog Produktion AB, Benny Andersson's company Mono Music AB, as well as a Dutch company holding Björn Ulvaeus's rights. The dispute was eventually settled out of court in July 1991; the terms of the settlement remain undisclosed.

In 1982, Anni-Frid Lyngstad had sold all the shares in the Polar Music company given to her by Anderson, as she moved abroad. She remains the only member of the band never to seek legal recourse for past royalty fees and was not involved with the legal proceedings against Anderson.

== Polar Music Prize ==
In 1989, Anderson made a substantial financial endowment to found the Polar Music Prize from money he made when he sold the multimillion-dollar record company Polar Records. In this deal nearly all utilisation and license rights, and the registered ABBA trademark, were sold for an unknown sum of money to PolyGram shortly before the ABBA members took him to court over royalty back payments. Previously, Anderson had licensed ABBA and the members' solo releases to labels internationally as a means to increase royalties. In 1998, PolyGram was in turn sold to Seagram and merged into what is now one of the Big Three record labels, the Universal Music Group, the company that holds the rights to the entire ABBA back catalogue.

== Personal life and death ==
Stig Anderson was married to Gudrun Anderson (née Rystedt, 1931–2010), and had two sons, Anders and Lasse and a daughter Marie. His daughter, Marie Ledin (born in 1957, wife of Swedish star and ABBA concert backing vocalist Tomas Ledin) was also involved in the music industry. In the mid-1980s she started a new, highly successful record label called Record Station (sold to German BMG in the early 1990s), followed by Anderson Records. Anderson Records released Anni-Frid Lyngstad's Swedish comeback album Djupa andetag in 1996, as well as Michael B. Tretow's Greatest Hits in 1999.

On 12 September 1997 at the age of 66, Stig Anderson died of a heart attack. His funeral was broadcast live by Sveriges Television.

== Sources ==
- Carl Magnus Palm: Bright Lights — Dark Shadows, Omnibus Press UK 2001, ISBN 0-7119-8389-5
