= 1927 in music =

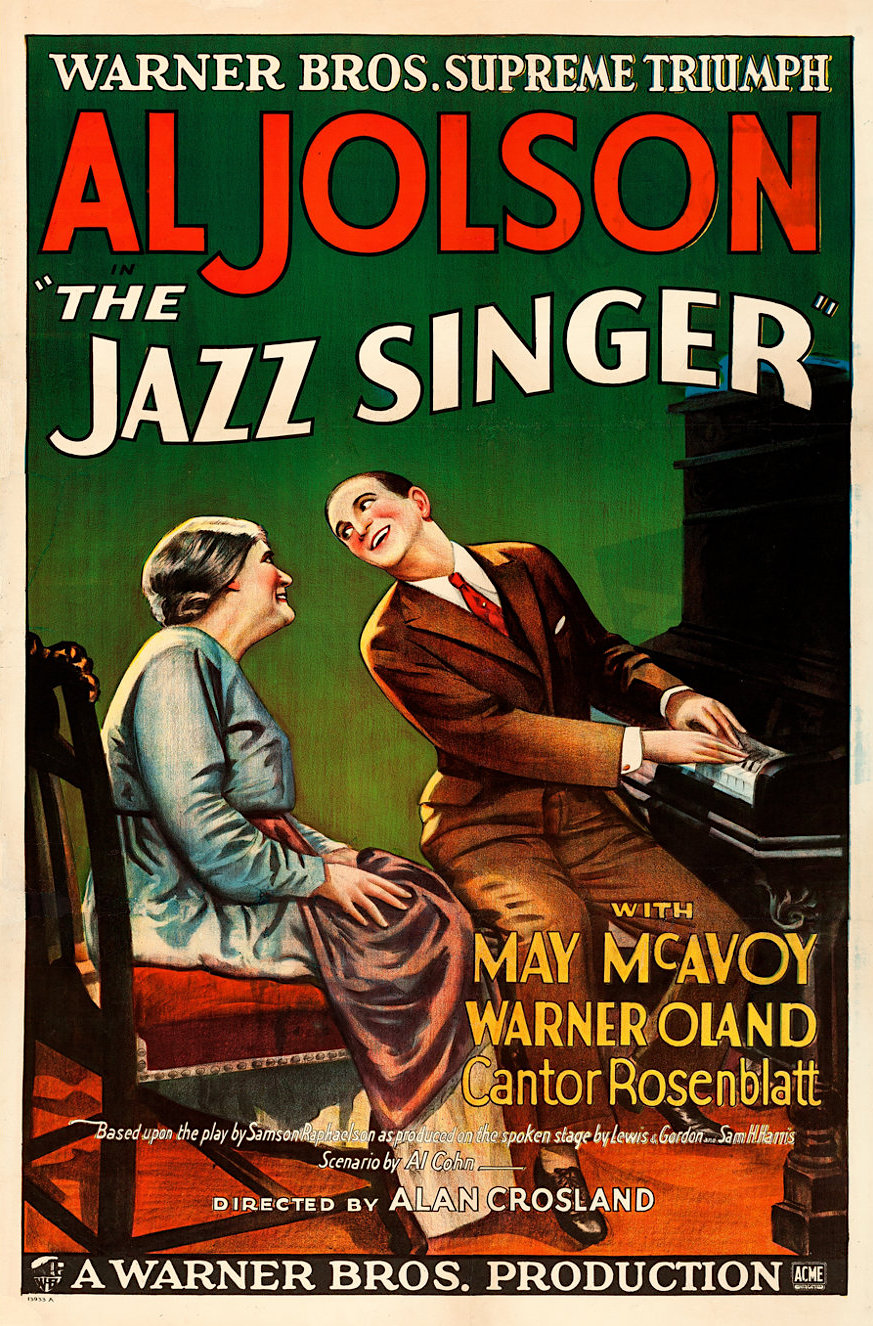
Al Jolson in his hit 1927 sound film, The Jazz Singer.

This is a list of notable events in music that took place in the year 1927.

== Specific locations ==
- 1927 in British music
- 1927 in Norwegian music

== Specific genres ==
- 1927 in country music
- 1927 in jazz

== Events ==
- January 8 – Alban Berg's Lyric Suite is premiered in Vienna.
- April 21 – Electric re-recording of George Gershwin's Rhapsody in Blue by Paul Whiteman's Orchestra directed by Nathaniel Shilkret with Gershwin at the piano.
- May – American all-girl harmony singing trio The Hamilton Sisters and Fordyce set out by air from New York with the American portion of New York's Savoy Orpheans band for a tour of English variety theatres. In June they record "My Heart Stood Still" (Rodgers and Hart) and "The Birth of the Blues" and with Bert Ambrose and others in London. On December 10 they take ship for France to visit Paris before returning to the United States.
- July 1 – Béla Bartók's Piano Concerto No. 1 is premiered in Frankfurt with the composer at the piano and Wilhelm Furtwängler conducting.
- August 4 – Country singer Jimmie Rodgers records his first sides for Victor in Camden, New Jersey.
- August 13 – The Proms concert season opens in London under management of the BBC, music publishers Chappell & Co. having withdrawn their financial support and disbanded the New Queen's Hall Orchestra after a symphony concert on March 19.
- December 5 – Leoš Janáček's Glagolitic Mass is premiered in Brno.
- December 27 – Kern and Hammerstein's musical play, Show Boat, based on Edna Ferber's novel, opens on Broadway and then goes on to become the first great classic of the American musical theater.
- December 31 – The original Savoy Orpheans and Savoy Havana London dance bands are disbanded.
- Charles Ives one day early in the year comes downstairs with tears in his eyes and tells his wife he can compose no more: "nothing sounds right". Jean Sibelius has also just entered a similar period of musical silence.
- Benjamin Britten is introduced to Frank Bridge at the Norfolk and Norwich Festival and becomes his pupil of at age 14.
- Witold Lutosławski enters the Warsaw conservatory.
- Recording careers begin for
  - Louis Armstrong and his Hot Seven.
  - Big Bill Broonzy.
  - The Carter Family.
  - Jim Jackson.
  - Blind Willie McTell.
  - The Soul Stirrers.

== Published popular music ==
- "Adios Muchachos" w. Cesar Felipe Vedani m. Julio Cesar Sanders (aka Lenny Sanders)
- "Ain't She Sweet" w. Jack Yellen m. Milton Ager
- "Among My Souvenirs" w. Edgar Leslie m. Horatio Nicholls
- "Are You Lonesome Tonight?" w. Roy Turk m. Lou Handman
- "At Sundown" w.m. Walter Donaldson
- "The Babbitt And The Bromide" w. Ira Gershwin m. George Gershwin
- "The Best Things In Life Are Free" w. B. G. De Sylva & Lew Brown m. Ray Henderson
- "Black And Tan Fantasy" m. Duke Ellington
- "Bless This House" w. Helen Taylor m. May Brahe
- "Blue Skies" w.m. Irving Berlin
- "Broken Hearted" w. B. G. De Sylva & Lew Brown m. Ray Henderson
- "Can't Help Lovin' Dat Man" w. Oscar Hammerstein II m. Jerome Kern. Introduced by Helen Morgan in the musical Show Boat
- "Changes" w.m. Walter Donaldson
- "Chlo-e (Song of the Swamp)" w. Gus Kahn m. Neil Moret
- "Creole Love Call" w.m. Edward "Duke" Ellington with vocal by Adelaide Hall
- "Dew-Dew-Dewy Day" w.m. Al Sherman, Charles Tobias & Howard Johnson
- "Diane" w.m. Ernie Rapee & Lew Pollack
- "Did You Mean It?" w. Abe Lyman & Sid Silvers m. Phil Baker
- "The Doll Dance" m. Nacio Herb Brown
- "Everywhere You Go" w.m. Larry Shay, Joe Goodwin & Mark Fisher
- "Fifty Million Frenchmen Can't Be Wrong" w. Willie Raskin & Billy Rose m. Fred Fisher
- "Four Or Five Times" w.m. Byron Gay
- "Funny Face" w. Ira Gershwin m. George Gershwin
- "Girl Of My Dreams" w.m. Sunny Clapp
- "Good News" w. B. G. De Sylva & Lew Brown m. Ray Henderson
- "Hallelujah!" w. Leo Robin & Clifford Grey m. Vincent Youmans
- "He Loves and She Loves" w. Ira Gershwin m. George Gershwin. Introduced by Adele Astaire and Allen Kearns in the musical Funny Face. Performed in the 1957 film version by Fred Astaire.
- "High Hat" w. Ira Gershwin m. George Gershwin
- "Hoosier Sweetheart" w.m. Billy Baskette, Paul Ash & Joe Goodwin
- "I Don't Know How" w. Lorenz Hart m. Richard Rodgers
- "I Feel At Home With You" w. Lorenz Hart m. Richard Rodgers
- "I Left My Sugar Standing In The Rain" w. Irving Kahal m. Sammy Fain
- "(I Scream You Scream, We All Scream for) Ice Cream" w.m. Robert King, Howard Johnson & Billy Moll
- "I Still Suits Me" w. Oscar Hammerstein II m. Jerome Kern
- "I'll Take Care Of Your Cares" w. Mort Dixon m. James V. Monaco
- "I'm Gonna Meet My Sweetie Now" w. Benny Davis m. Jesse Greer
- "I'm Looking Over A Four Leaf Clover" w. Mort Dixon m. Harry Woods
- "I'm Proud Of A Baby Like You" Schoenberg, Stevens, Helmick
- "In A Mist" m. Bix Beiderbecke
- "It All Belongs To Me" w.m. Irving Berlin
- "Just Like A Butterfly" w. Mort Dixon m. Harry Woods
- "Let A Smile Be Your Umbrella" w. Irving Kahal & Francis Wheeler m. Sammy Fain
- "Let's Kiss And Make Up" w. Ira Gershwin m. George Gershwin. Introduced by Fred Astaire and Adele Astaire in the musical Funny Face
- "Lindbergh (The Eagle of the U.S.A.)" w.m. Al Sherman & Howard Johnson
- "The Lonesome Road" w. Gene Austin m. Nathaniel Shilkret
- "Lucky Lindy" w. L. Wolfe Gilbert m. Abel Baer
- "Mary, (What Are You Waiting For)" w.m. Walter Donaldson
- "Maybe It's Me" w. Lorenz Hart m. Richard Rodgers
- "Me And My Shadow" w.m. Dave Dreyer, Billy Rose & Al Jolson
- "Miss Annabelle Lee" w.m. Lew Pollack, Sidney Clare & Harry Richman
- "Mississippi Mud" w. James Cavanaugh m. Harry Barris
- "My Blue Heaven" w. George A. Whiting m. Walter Donaldson
- "My Heart Stood Still" w. Lorenz Hart m. Richard Rodgers
- "My One And Only" w. Ira Gershwin m. George Gershwin
- "Ol' Man River" w. Oscar Hammerstein II m. Jerome Kern
- "Plenty Of Sunshine" w. B. G. De Sylva & Lew Brown m. Ray Henderson
- "Preludes" by George Gershwin
- "Rain" w.m. Eugene Ford, Carey Morgan & Arthur Swanstrom
- "Ramona (Song)" w. L. Wolfe Gilbert m. Mabel Wayne
- "The Rangers' Song" w. Joseph McCarthy m. Harry A. Tierney. Introduced in the musical Rio Rita by J. Harold Murray, Harry Ratcliffe, Donald Douglas and chorus. Performed in the 1929 film version by John Boles and chorus.
- "A Room with a View" w.m. Noël Coward
- "Rosy Cheeks" w.m. Seymour Simons & Richard A. Whiting
- "Russian Lullaby" w.m. Irving Berlin
- "'S Wonderful" w. Ira Gershwin m. George Gershwin
- "Shaking the Blues Away" w.m. Irving Berlin
- "Side by Side" w.m. Harry Woods
- "Sometimes I'm Happy" w. Irving Caesar m. Vincent Youmans from the musical Hit the Deck
- "The Song Is Ended" w.m. Irving Berlin
- "Strike Up The Band" w. Ira Gershwin m. George Gershwin
- "Struttin' With Some Barbecue" w.m. Louis Armstrong & Lillian Hardin Armstrong
- "Thou Swell" w. Lorenz Hart m. Richard Rodgers. Introduced by William Gaxton and Constance Carpenter in the musical A Connecticut Yankee. Performed in the 1948 film Words and Music by June Allyson and The Blackburn Twins.
- "The Varsity Drag" w. B. G. De Sylva & Lew Brown m. Ray Henderson
- "Washboard Blues" m. Hoagy Carmichael & Irving Mills
- "What Does It Matter?" w.m. Irving Berlin
- "Where's That Rainbow?" Lorenz Hart m. Richard Rodgers
- "Why Do I Love You?" w. Oscar Hammerstein II m. Jerome Kern
- "You Remind Me Of A Naughty Springtime Cuckoo" w.m. Leslie Sarony
- "Your Land And My Land" w. Dorothy Donnelly m. Sigmund Romberg
- "You're Always In My Arms" w. Joseph McCarthy m. Harry Tierney

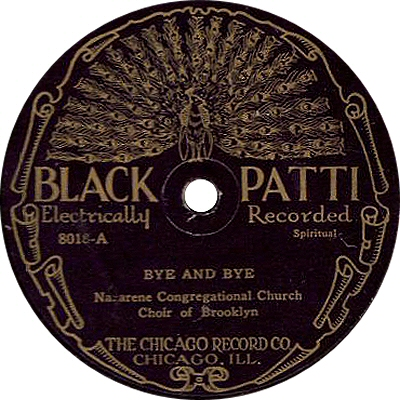
The short lived Black Patti Records label appeared in 1927

== Top Popular Recordings 1927 ==
The following songs achieved the highest positions in Joel Whitburn's Pop Memories 1890-1954 and record sales reported on the "Discography of American Historical Recordings" website during 1927: Numerical rankings are approximate, and only used as a frame of reference.

#	Artist	Title	Label	Recording Date	Release date	Chart Positions
1	Gene Austin	"My Blue Heaven"	Victor 20964	September 14, 1927	November 1927	US Billboard 1927 number 1, US number 1 for 13 weeks, 26 total weeks, 1,000,000 sales
2	Moran And Mack	Two Black Crows Parts 1 & 2 (The Early Bird Catches The Worm)"	Columbia 935	March 14, 1927	May 1927	US Billboard 1927 number 2, US number 1 for 5 weeks, 12 total weeks, 2,500,000 sold
3	Paul Whiteman and His Orchestra	"In a Little Spanish Town"	Victor 20266	September 9, 1926	December 1926	US Billboard 1927 number 3, US number 1 for 8 weeks, 15 total weeks, 1,000,000 sales
4	Guy Lombardo and His Royal Canadians	"Charmaine"	Columbia 1048	June 13, 1927	August 1927	US Billboard 1927 number 4, US number 1 for 7 weeks, 15 total weeks
5	Sophie Tucker with Ted Lewis and His Band	"Some of These Days"	Columbia 826	November 23, 1926	October 1927	US Billboard 1927 number 5, US number 1 for 5 weeks, 12 total weeks, 938,466 sales
6	Whispering Jack Smith	"Me and My Shadow"	Victor 20626	April 28, 1927	July 1927	US Billboard 1927 number 6, US number 1 for 4 week, 14 total weeks
7	Ben Bernie and His Hotel Roosevelt Orchestra	"Ain't She Sweet"	Brunswick 3444	January 28, 1927	March 1927	US Billboard 1927 number 7, US number 1 for 4 weeks, 12 total weeks
8	Roger Wolfe Kahn & His Orchestra	"Russian Lullaby"	Victor 21308	March 8, 1927	June 1927	US Billboard 1927 number 8, US number 1 for 1 week, 12 total weeks
9	Red Nichols and His Five Pennies	"Ida, Sweet as Apple Cider"	Columbia 1471	July 3, 1927	September 1927	US Billboard 1927 number 9, US number 1 for 1 week, 11 total weeks
10	Gene Austin	"Tonight You Belong to Me"	Victor 20371	June 26, 1927	September 7, 1927	US Billboard 1927 number 10, US number 1 for 5 weeks, 15 total weeks
11	George Olsen and His Music	"At Sundown (When Love is Calling Me Home)"	Victor 20476	February 4, 1927	July 1927	US Billboard 1927 number 11, US number 1 for 3 week, 12 total weeks
12	The Knickerbockers (Ben Selvin Orchestra)	"Blue Skies"	Columbia 860-D	January 15, 1927	May 1927	US Billboard 1927 number 12, US number 1 for 2 weeks, 9 total weeks
13	Paul Whiteman and His Orchestra	"My Blue Heaven"	Victor 20828	July 6, 1927	October 1927	US Billboard 1927 number 13, US number 1 for 1 weeks, 16 total weeks
14	Gene Austin with (Nat Shilkret Orchestra)	"Forgive Me"	Victor 20561	March 15, 1927	June 1927	US Billboard 1927 number 14, US number 1 for 1 week, 11 total weeks
15	Paul Whiteman and His Concert Orchestra	"When Day Is Done"	Victor 35828	July 6, 1927	September 1927	US Billboard 1927 number 15, US number 2 for 4 weeks, 12 total weeks
16	Fred Waring's Pennsylvanians	"It Made You Happy When You Made Me Cry"	Victor 20315	October 7, 1926	January 1927	US Billboard 1927 number 16, US number 2 for 4 weeks, 8 total weeks
17	Nick Lucas	"I'm Looking Over a Four Leaf Clover"	Brunswick 3439	January 25, 1927	March 1927	US Billboard 1927 number 17, US number 2 for 2 weeks, 10 total weeks
18	George Olsen and His Music	"Blue Skies"	Victor 20455	January 19, 1927	April 1927	US Billboard 1927 number 18, US number 2 for 2 week, 10 total weeks
19	Ruth Etting	"Deed I Do"	Columbia 865	December 1, 1926	January 1927	US Billboard 1927 number 19, US number 2 for 2 weeks, 7 total weeks
20	Nat Shilkret and the Victor Orchestra (vocal Johnny Marvin)	"All Alone Monday"	Victor 20259	October 8, 1926	December 1926	US Billboard 1927 number 20, US number 2 for 2 weeks, 7 total weeks
21	Gertrude Lawrence	"Someone to Watch Over Me"	Victor 20331	October 29, 1926	February 1927	US Billboard 1927 number 21, US number 2 for 1 week, 11 total weeks

== Classical music ==
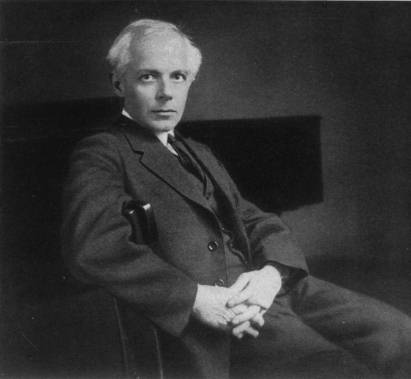
Bartók in 1927

- Béla Bartók – String Quartet No. 3
- Havergal Brian – Symphony No. 1 "Gothic"
- Frank Bridge – Rhapsody: Enter Spring
- John Alden Carpenter – String Quartet
- Aaron Copland – Piano Concerto
- Pierre-Octave Ferroud – Sérénade pour orchestre
- Gerald Finzi – Violin Concerto
- André Fleury – Allegro symphonique
- Reinhold Glière – The Red Poppy
- Leopold Godowsky – 4 Poems (no. 1–3)
- Karl Amadeus Hartmann – Two Sonatas for Unaccompanied Violin
- Paul Hindemith – 8 Pieces for Solo Flute
- Dmitri Kabalevsky – Piano Sonata No. 1
- Albert Ketèlbey – By the Blue Hawaiian Waters
- Zoltán Kodály – Suite from the opera Háry János
- Józef Koffler – Musique. Quasi una sonata; 15 variations on a 12 tone series (15 variations d'après une suite de douze tons) (opp. 8 & 9)
- Bohuslav Martinů – La Revue de Cuisine
- Darius Milhaud
  - Violin Concerto No. 1, Op. 93
  - 3 Caprices de Paganini for violin and piano, Op. 97
  - Sonatina for clarinet and piano, Op. 100
- Carl Nielsen – An Imaginary Trip to the Faroe Islands (orchestral)
- Dane Rudhyar – Paeans
- Henri Sauguet – La Chatte (ballet)
- Arnold Schoenberg – String Quartet No. 3
- Roger Sessions – Symphony No. 1
- Dmitri Shostakovich – Symphony No. 2 in B major, Op. 14
- Igor Stravinsky – Oedipus Rex
- Karol Szymanowski – String Quartet No. 2
- Alexander Tcherepnin
  - Symphony No. 1, Op. 42
  - Quintet, for Piano and Strings, Op. 44
- Edgard Varèse – Arcana (1925–27)
- Anton Webern – String Trio, Op. 20

== Opera ==
- Paul Hindemith – Hin und zurück
- Erich Wolfgang Korngold – Das Wunder der Heliane
- Ernst Krenek – Jonny spielt auf
- Franz Lehár – Der Zarewitsch
- Darius Milhaud – 3 Opéras-minutes
  - L'enlèvement d'Europe, Op. 94; 1 act, 8 scenes; libretto by Henri Hoppenot
  - L'abandon d'Ariane, Op. 98; 1 act, 5 scenes; libretto by Henri Hoppenot
  - La délivrance de Thésée, Op. 99; 1 act, 6 scenes; libretto by Henri Hoppenot
- Sergei Prokofiev – The Fiery Angel
- Jaromír Weinberger – Švanda the Bagpiper

== Film ==
- Gottfried Huppertz – Metropolis (1927 film)
- Edmund Meisel – Berlin: Die Sinfonie der Großstadt
- Henri Rabaud – Le joueur d'échecs

== Musical theater ==
- Burlesque Broadway production opened at the Plymouth Theatre on September 1 and ran for 372 performances
- Clowns in Clover London revue opened at the Adelphi Theatre on December 1 and ran for 508 performances
- The Desert Song (Sigmund Romberg) – London production opened at the Drury Lane Theatre on April 7 and ran for 432 performances
- Enchanted Isle (Music, Lyrics and Book: Ida H. Chamberlain). Broadway production opened at the Lyric Theatre on September 19 and ran for 32 performances. Starring Marga Waldron and Greek Evans.
- The Five O'Clock Girl opened at the 44th Street Theatre on October 10 and transferred to the Shubert Theatre on April 16, 1928, for a total run of 280 performances
- Funny Face Broadway production opened at the Alvin Theatre on November 22 and ran for 250 performances
- Golden Dawn Broadway operetta opened at the Hammerstein Theatre on November 30 and ran for 184 performances
- Good News! Broadway production opened at the 46th Street Theatre on September 6 and ran for 557 performances
- Hit The Deck (Vincent Youmans and Clifford Grey)
  - Broadway production opened at the Belasco Theatre on April 25 and ran for 532 performances
  - London production opened at the Hippodrome on November 3 and ran for 277 performances
- Just Fancy Broadway production opened at the Casino Theatre on October 11 and ran for 79 performances. Starring Mrs Thomas Whiffen, Peggy O'Neill, Ivy Sawyer, Joseph Santley, Eric Blore and Raymond Hitchcock.
- The Merry Malones Broadway production opened at the Erlanger's Theatre on September 26 and ran for 216 performances
- My Maryland Broadway production opened at the Jolson Theatre on September 12 and ran for 312 performances
- Oh, Kay! London production opened at His Majesty's Theatre on September 21 and ran for 214 performances
- One Dam Thing After Another London production opened at the Pavilion Theatre on May 20
- Peggy-Ann London production opened at Daly's Theatre on July 27 and ran for 130 performances
- Polly of Hollywood Broadway production opened at George M. Cohan's Theatre on February 21 and ran for 24 performances. Starring Midge Miller.
- Rio Rita Broadway production opened at the Ziegfeld Theatre on February 2 and ran for 494 performances
- Show Boat (Jerome Kern and Oscar Hammerstein II) – Broadway production opened at the Ziegfeld Theatre on December 27 and ran for 572 performances
- The Vagabond King London production opened at the Winter Garden Theatre on April 19 and ran for 480 performances
- The White Eagle Broadway production opened at the Casino Theatre on December 26 and ran for 48 performances
- Yes, Yes, Yvette Broadway production opened at the Sam H. Harris Theatre on October 3 and ran for 40 performances

== Musical film ==
- The Jazz Singer released October 6, starring Al Jolson

== Births ==
- January 10
  - Johnnie Ray, American singer, pianist and songwriter (d. 1990)
  - Guillermo Rubalcaba, Cuban musician and bandleader (d. 2015)
- January 14 – Zuzana Růžičková, Czech harpsichord player (d. 2017)
- January 17 – Eartha Kitt, singer (d. 2008)
- January 18 – S. Balachander, Indian actor, singer and veena player (d. 1990)
- January 27 – Billy Barnes, American actor and composer (d. 2012)
- January 28 – Ronnie Scott, jazz saxophonist and club owner (d. 1996)
- February 2
  - Stan Getz, jazz musician (d. 1991)
  - Richard Maxfield, composer (d. 1969)
- February 3 – Val Doonican, singer (d. 2015)
- February 7
  - Juliette Gréco, cabaret singer and actress (d. 2020)
  - Laurie Johnson, television theme composer and arranger (d. 2024)
- February 9 – Joe Maneri, composer (d. 2009)
- February 10 – Leontyne Price, opera singer
- February 11 – Michel Sénéchal, French tenor (d. 2018)
- February 21 – Walter S. Hartley, American composer (d. 2016)
- February 23
  - Régine Crespin, French operatic soprano (d. 2007)
  - Ivan Hrušovský, composer (d. 2001)
- February 25 – Ralph Stanley, bluegrass banjo player and vocalist (d. 2016)
- February 27 – Guy Mitchell, singer (d. 1999)
- March 1 – Harry Belafonte, mento and crossover pop singer (d. 2023)
- March 3 – Junior Parker, blues musician (d. 1971)
- March 16 – Ruby Braff, jazz trumpeter (d. 2003)
- March 18 – John Kander, composer of musicals
- March 20 – John Joubert (composer), composer (d. 2019)
- March 27 – Mstislav Rostropovich, cellist (d. 2007)
- April 3 – Ladislav Burlas, Slovak composer (d. 2024)
- April 6 – Gerry Mulligan, American jazz saxophonist (d. 1996)
- April 10 – Luigi Alva, Peruvian opera singer (d. 2025)
- April 17 – Junior Collins, American-French horn player (d. 1976)
- April 22 – Laurel Aitken, Cuban-Jamaican ska singer (d. 2005)
- April 24 – Seymour Bernstein, pianist
- May 1 – Gary Bertini, conductor (d. 2005)
- May 5 – Babs Beverley (d. 2018) and Teddie Beverley (d. 2026), close harmony singers
- May 13 – Fred Hellerman, folk singer (d. 2016)
- May 26 – Rafael Escalona, vallenato composer and performer (d. 2009)
- June 3 – Boots Randolph, session musician (d. 2007)
- June 11 – Ronald Barnes, carillonist (d. 1997)
- June 17 – Martin Böttcher, German composer, arranger, conductor (d. 2019)
- June 23 – Bob Fosse, choreographer (d. 1987)
- July 3 – Ken Russell, British director of composer biopics (d. 2011)
- July 4 – Wilfred Josephs, English composer (d. 1997)
- July 6
  - Dolores Claman, Canadian composer and pianist (d. 2021)
  - Alan Freeman, Australian radio DJ (d. 2006)
- July 7
  - Charlie Louvin, American country singer and songwriter (d. 2011)
  - Doc Severinsen, American jazz trumpeter
- July 9 – Ed Ames, American singer and actor (Ames Brothers)
- July 11 - Herbert Blomstedt, Swedish conductor (d. 2026)
- July 16 – Mindy Carson, American singer
- July 18
  - Don Bagley, American bassist (d. 2012)
  - Kurt Masur, German orchestral conductor (d. 2015)
- July 20 – Michael Gielen, Austrian conductor (d. 2019)
- July 27 – Guy Carawan, American folk musician and musicologist (d. 2015)
- July 30 – Tony Hiller, English songwriter and record producer (d. 2018)
- August 4
  - Eddie Kamae, American ukuleleist (d. 2017)
  - Johnny Maddox, American pianist (d. 2018)
  - Del Shankel, American microbiologist, academic administrator (d. 2018)
  - Jess Thomas, American tenor (d. 1993)
- August 11 – Raymond Leppard, conductor (d. 2019)
- August 12 – Porter Wagoner, country singer (d. 2007)
- September 11 – Vernon Corea, Sri Lankan radio DJ, "Golden Voice of Radio Ceylon" (d. 2002)
- September 13 – Melitta Muszely, Austrian soprano (d. 2023)
- September 19 – Peter Van Wood, Dutch guitarist, singer, songwriter, actor and astrologer (d. 2010)
- September 21 – Ward Swingle, American-born vocalist (d. 2015)
- September 25 – Sir Colin Davis, orchestral conductor (d. 2013)
- September 27 – Red Rodney, jazz trumpeter (d. 1994)
- October 4 – Guy A. Marco, musicologist and librarian (d. 2022)
- October 7 – Al Martino, singer (d. 2009)
- October 13 – Anita Kerr, singer and arranger (d. 2022)
- October 25 – Barbara Cook, singer and actress (d. 2017)
- October 27 – Dominick Argento, composer (d. 2019)
- October 28 – Cleo Laine, jazz singer (d. 2025)
- November 3 – Jan Stoeckart, Dutch composer, conductor, trombonist and radio producer (d. 2017)
- November 5 – Ellie Mannette, Trinidadian steel pan musician (d. 2018)
- November 8 – Patti Page, singer (d. 2013)
- November 10
  - Richard Connolly, Australian hymnodist (d. 2022)
  - Sabah, Lebanese esinger (d. 2014)
- November 11 – Mose Allison, jazz pianist (d. 2016)
- November 16 – Dolo Coker, American jazz pianist and composer (d. 1983)
- November 18 – Hank Ballard, R&B singer (d. 2003)
- November 19 – Allan Smethurst, "The Singing Postman", folk singer (d. 2000)
- November 21 – Charlie Palmieri, salsa musician (d. 1988)
- November 22 – Jimmy Knepper, jazz trombonist (d. 2003)
- December 5 – W. D. Amaradeva, Sri Lanka maestro (d. 2016)
- December 9 – Pierre Henry, musique concrète composer (d. 2017)
- December 23 – Alexander Vedernikov, Russian singer and teacher (d. 2018)
- December 25 – Ram Narayan, Indian sarangi player
- December 26 – Denis Quilley, musical theatre actor (d. 2003)

== Deaths ==
- January 29 – Grace Van Studdiford, operatic singer (born 1873)
- January 30 – Friedrich Koch, operatic singer (born 1862)
- February 9 – James Warren York, businessman and musical instrument maker (b. 1839)
- February 19 – Robert Fuchs, composer and teacher (b. 1847)
- February 23 – Sveinbjörn Sveinbjörnsson, composer (b. 1847)
- February 26 – Isabel Jay, singer and actress with the d'Oyly Carte Opera Company (b. 1879)
- March 3 – Alberto Zelman, musician and conductor (b. 1874)
- March 17 – James Scott Skinner, violinist (b. 1843)
- March 31 – Edward Lloyd, concert and oratorio tenor (b. 1845)
- April 16 – Rosa Sucher, Soprano opera singer (b. 1849)
- May 3 – Ernest Ball, singer and songwriter (b. 1878)
- May 4 – Jakob Aljaž, priest and composer (b. 1845)
- May 16 – Sam Bernard, star of vaudeville and comic opera (b. 1863)
- May 29 – Jesse Shepard, composer and pianist (b. 1848)
- July 2 – Frank Curzon, theatre manager (b. 1869)
- July 17 – Luise Adolpha Le Beau, composer (b. 1850)
- August 13
  - Hermann Abert, music historian (b. 1871)
  - Árpád Doppler, composer (b. 1857)
- August 20 – Fannie Bloomfield Zeisler, pianist (b. 1863)
- September 4 – Isadora Duncan, dancer (b. 1877) (strangled in freak accident)
- September 18 – Marie Mattfeld, opera singer (b. 1870)
- October 1 – Wilhelm Harteveld, composer (b. 1859)
- October 4 – John William Boone, composer and pianist (born 1864)
- October 21 – John Stillwell Stark, music publisher (b. 1841)
- November 2 – Fred Billington, Baritone opera singer and actor with the d'Oyly Carte (b. 1854)
- November 3 – George Dallas Sherman, bandleader (b. 1844)
- November 9 – Ole Olsen, organist, composer and conductor (b. 1850)
- November 18 – Emma Carus, contralto (b. 1879)
- November 20 – Wilhelm Stenhammar, composer, pianist and conductor (b. 1871)
- December 21 – Courtice Pounds, singer and actor with the d'Oyly Carte (b. 1862)
- date unknown
  - Bulbuljan, Azerbaijani folk musician (b. 1841)
  - Haldane Burgess, writer and musician (b. 1862)
  - Pierre-Émile Engel, operatic tenor (b. 1847)
