= 1927 in Nordic music =

The following is a list of notable events and compositions of the year 1927 in Nordic music.

== Events ==
- 4 January – In a letter to his wife, Carl Nielsen writes that he has only 8–10 days "to write an overture to mark a big Faroese gala at the Royal Theatre supported by the State..." The occasion is later postponed until November 1927.
- 31 July – Kurt Atterberg's incidental music for Shakespeare's Julius Caesar is broadcast on Sveriges Radio.
- December – Eric Bengtson becomes music director at the Svensk Filmindustri in Stockholm.
- unknown date
  - Jean Sibelius is recorded on film for the first time, at home in Ainola, by Heikki Aho and Björn Soldan. Sibelius is filmed playing the piano and sitting at his desk.
  - At the Nordic Music Festival in Stockholm, Hilding Rosenberg’s first violin concerto is premièred by Tobias Wilhelmi.

== New works ==
- Kurt Atterberg – Julius Caesar (incidental music)
- Carl Nielsen – An Imaginary Trip to the Faroe Islands
- Jean Sibelius – Vapaamuurareiden rituaalimusiikkia

== Popular music ==
- Helge Lindberg & Gösta Stevens – "De' ä' grabben med chokla' i"

== Births ==
- 10 May – Eva Knardahl, Norwegian classical pianist (died 2006)
- 11 July – Herbert Blomstedt, US-born Swedish conductor
- 14 July – Max Brüel, Danish jazz pianist and saxophonist (died 1995)
- 6 October – Birgit Brüel, Danish singer and actress (died 1996)
- 5 October – Karin Langebo, Swedish operatic soprano and harpist (died 2019)
- 28 November – Gullan Bornemark, Swedish musician, lyricist and composer

== Deaths ==
- 4 February – Thomas Laub, Danish organist and composer (born 1852)
- 10 February – Laura Netzel, Swedish pianist, conductor and composer (born 1839)
- 23 February – Sveinbjörn Sveinbjörnsson, Icelandic composer (born 1847)
- 1 October – Wilhelm Harteveld, Swedish composer and musicologist (born 1859)
- 4 November – Ole Olsen, Norwegian organist, composer, conductor and military musician (born 1850)
- 20 November – Wilhelm Stenhammar, Swedish pianist conductor and composer (born 1871)
- 24 December – Helmer Alexandersson, Swedish violinist and composer (born 1886)

== See also ==
- 1927 in Denmark
- 1927 in Iceland
- 1927 in Norwegian music
- 1927 in Sweden
