= 1859 in music =

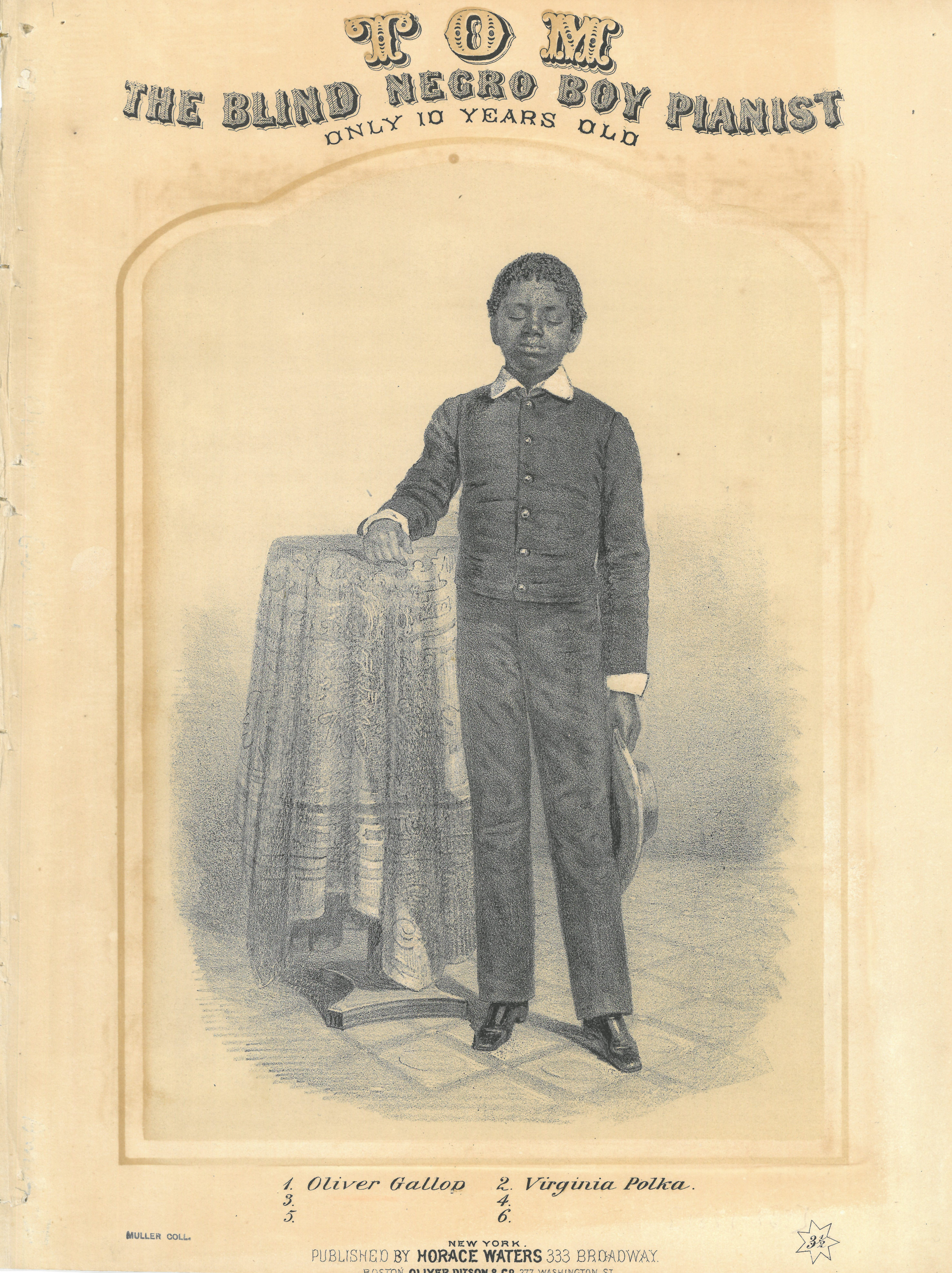
Blind Tom Wiggins, on the front of the sheet music for his compositions "Oliver Gallop" and "Virginia Polka,” published in 1859.

== Events ==
- January 14 – Hans von Bülow interrupts a performance of Franz Liszt's Die Ideale at the Berlin Singakademie to ask for hostile elements in the audience to be silent.
- January 22 – The First Piano Concerto of Johannes Brahms is given its first public performance in Hanover.
- February 8 – Count Michael Wielhorsky invites musical associates to his home in an attempt to revive the Symphonic Society; this indirectly results in the formation of the Russian Musical Society, under the patronage of Grand Duchess Elena Pavlovna and her protégé, Anton Rubinstein.
- March 4 – Charter of the French Opera House, New Orleans, which opens on December 1 of this year with a gala performance of Rossini's William Tell.
- March 11 – Giuseppe Verdi announces his retirement to friends at a dinner party.
- March 12 – The Prelude to Act 1 of Tristan und Isolde receives its first public performance at the Sophieninselsaal in Prague, at a charity concert in aid of poor medical students, conducted by Hans von Bülow, who provides his own concert ending for the occasion. Wagner completes the opera this year.
- April 3 – Richard Wagner takes up residence in Lucerne, Switzerland.
- April 4 – Bryant's Minstrels premiere the minstrel song "Dixie" (probably written by Dan Emmett) at Mechanics' Hall in New York City as part of their blackface show.
- April 4 – Tannhäuser is performed at the Stadt Theater in New York City under the musical direction of Carl Bergmann. It is the first performance of a Wagner opera in the United States.
- May 6 – At the first concert of the Victoria Philharmonic Society, its future conductor John Bayley is a soloist on both clarinet and violin.
- July 1 – A monument to George Frideric Handel (by Hermann Heidel) is unveiled in his birthplace, Halle; Franz Liszt is among those present.
- October 23 – Richard Wagner and an ailing Hector Berlioz meet in Paris and make up their differences.
- December 19 – César Franck inaugurates the new organ at the basilia of Sainte-Clotilde, Paris, an instrument built by Aristide Cavaillé-Coll.
- Alexander Borodin begins a period of chemical research at Heidelberg, working on benzene derivatives.
- Alberto Mazzucato becomes musical director of La Scala opera house.

== Published popular music ==
- "Darling little blue eyed Nell" w. B. E. Woolf m. Frederick Buckley
- "I’m on My Journey Home" Sarah Lancaster
- "Thou Art the Queen of My Song" Stephen Foster
- In 1859, John Freeman Young published the English translation of Silent Night that is most frequently sung today.
- "Upidee", arranged by H. G. Spaulding

== Classical music ==
- Charles-Valentin Alkan – Concerto for Solo Piano
- Mily Balakirev – Overture to King Lear
- Hector Berlioz
  - arrangement of Plaisir d’amour, H.134
  - Hymne pour la consécration du nouveau tabernacle, H 135
- Johannes Brahms
  - Piano Concerto No. 1
  - Serenade No. 2 in A
  - Psalm 13, Op.27
- Max Bruch
  - Piano Trio, Op.5
  - String Quartet No. 1 in C minor, Op. 9
- Felix Draeseke – Helges Treue
- Jules Egghard – Méditation d'une jeune fille, Op.41
- Edvard Grieg
  - 23 Little Piano Pieces, EG 104
  - Siehst du das Meer, for voice and piano
- Fromental Halévy – Italie (cantata)
- Friedrich Hegar – Violin Sonata in C minor
- Stephen Heller – 2 Valses, Op.93
- Theodor Kirchner – 16 Preludes, Op.9
- Franz Liszt
  - Totentanz
  - first version of Psalm 23
  - Prelude after a theme from Weinen, Klagen, Sorgen, Zagen for piano
  - Deux Épisodes d'apres le Faust de Lenau (orchestral arrangement)
  - Festgesang, S.26
  - Te Deum II for chorus, organ, brass and percussion, S. 27
  - Künstlerfestzug zur Schillerfeier 1859, S.114
- Giacomo Meyerbeer – Le revenant du vieux château de Bade, ballade
- Stanisław Moniuszko – Śpiewnik domowy No.5
- Michał Kleofas Ogiński – 6 Polonaises
- Joachim Raff – 6 Morceaux, Op.85
- Stanislas Verroust
  - Solo de concert No.4, Op.77
  - Solo de concert No.5, Op.78
  - Solo de concert No.6, Op.79

== Opera ==
- César Cui – The Mandarin's Son
- Félicien David – Herculanum, premiered March 4 in Paris
- Léo Delibes – L'Omelette à la Follembuche
- Charles Gounod – Faust first performed March 19 in Paris. Libretto by Jules Barbier and Michel Carré, based on a work by Johann Wolfgang von Goethe.
- Giacomo Meyerbeer – Le pardon de Ploërmel
- Giuseppe Verdi – Un ballo in maschera, premiered February 17 in Rome.

== Musical theater ==
- Jacques Offenbach
  - Geneviève de Brabant, original version. Premiered November 19 in Paris.
  - Les vivandières de la grande armée

== Births ==
- January 26 – W. O. Forsyth, pianist and composer (died 1937)
- February 1 – Victor Herbert, cellist, conductor and composer (died 1924)
- March 8
  - Karl Eduard Goepfart, composer (died 1942)
  - Otto Taubmann, composer (died 1929)
- March 10 – Pauline Schöller, Austrian soprano (died 1941)
- April 3 – Reginald de Koven, US composer (died 1920)
- April 5 – Wilhelm Harteveld, composer (died 1927)
- April 11 – Basil Harwood, organist and composer (died 1949)
- May 13
  - August Enna, composer (died 1939)
  - Cora S. Briggs, organist and composer (died 1935)
- June 22 – Frank Heino Damrosch, founder of Institute of Music (died 1937)
- June 27 – Mildred J. Hill, composer of "Happy Birthday to You" (died 1916)
- July 11 – Alfred Maria Willner, composer (died 1929)
- July 15 – Carlo Munier, musician (died 1911)
- July 21 – Charles H. Taylor, lyricist (died 1907)
- September 21 – Otto Lohse, conductor and composer (died 1925)
- September 24 – Julius Klengel, cellist, composer (died 1933)
- October 14 – Camille Chevillard, conductor and composer (died 1923)
- October 16 – John Marquardt, violinist (died 1943)
- October 20
  - John Lund, conductor and composer (died 1925)
  - Guglielmo Zuelli, opera composer (died 1941)
- October 26 – Arthur Friedheim, Russian-born pianist
- November 15 – Joseph Vidal, composer (died 1924)
- November 17 – Gerhard Rosenkrone Schjelderup, composer (died 1933)
- November 19 – Mikhail Ippolitov-Ivanov, conductor and composer (died 1935)
- November 22 – Cecil Sharp, folk music revivalist (died 1924)
- November 30 – Sergei Lyapunov, pianist and composer (died 1924)
- December 21 – Max Fiedler, conductor and composer (died 1939)
- December 23 – Adrian Ross, English lyricist (died 1933)
- December 24 – Roman Statkowski, composer (died 1925)
- December 27 – William Henry Hadow, musicologist (died 1937)
- December 30 – Josef Bohuslav Foerster, composer (died 1951)

== Deaths ==
- January 7 – Peter Ferdinand Funck, violinist and composer (born 1788)
- January 13 – Francisco José Debali, composer (born 1791)
- January 20 – Bettina von Arnim, composer (born 1785)
- February 6 – Jane Stirling, pianist and friend of Frédéric Chopin (born 1804; ovarian cyst)
- February 26 – Ferdinand Lukas Schubert, composer (born 1794)
- March 14 – Nicola Tacchinardi, cellist and operatic tenor (born 1772)
- March 30 – Philippe Musard, composer (born 1792)
- April 14 – Ignaz Bösendorfer, piano manufacturer (born 1796)
- July 23 – Marceline Desbordes-Valmore, actress, singer and poet (born 1786)
- July 29
  - Léon-Lévy Brunswick, librettist (born 1805)
  - Auguste Mathieu Panseron, composer and singing teacher (born 1796)
- August 18 – Antonio d'Antoni, opera composer and conductor (born 1801)
- August 28 – Edward Holmes, musicologist, music critic, pianist and music educator (born 1797)
- October 16 – John Fane, 11th Earl of Westmorland, soldier, politician, diplomat and musician (born 1784)
- October 22 – Louis Spohr, violinist, conductor and composer (born 1784)
- November 7 – Carl Gottlieb Reißiger, Kapellmeister and composer (born 1798)
- December 13 – Daniel Liszt, son of Franz Liszt and Countess Marie d'Agoult (born 1839; tuberculosis)
- December 31 – Luigi Ricci, composer (born 1805)
- Date unknown – Lewis Henry Lavenu, conductor, composer and impresario (born 1818)
