= 1886 in Nordic music =

The following is a list of notable events that occurred in the year 1886 in Nordic music.

== Events ==
- unknown date
  - The Finnish Literature Society advertises for "folk songs, dance or poetry tunes carefully written down from people (in other words, notated music)".
  - Hoping to make a career as a violinist, Finnish music student Jean Sibelius gives a performance of Ferdinand David's Violin Concerto.
  - "Jag lyfter ögat mot himmelen", with music by Rudolf Lagi and words by Finnish poet Johan Ludvig Runeberg, is introduced to the Finnish hymnal, Virsikirja
  - Norwegian soprano Anna Kriebel Vanzo visits Edvard Grieg at Troldhaugen, and he recognises her singing talent.

== New works ==
- Edvard Grieg – Lyric Pieces (Lyriske stykker), Book III
- Robert Kajanus – Suomalainen rapsodia (Finnish rhapsody) No. 2 in F major
- Jean Sibelius – Piano Trio in A minor (Hafträsk)
- Christian Sinding – Klavierstudien, Op. 7

== Popular music ==
- Emanuel David Booth-Hellberg – "En dag vid tusen åskors ljud" (translated from the original by T. H. Hill)

== Births ==
- 12 February – Gustaf Nordqvist, Swedish composer and music teacher (died 1949)
- 18 May – Ole Windingstad, Norwegian pianist and composer (died 1959)
- 30 June – Launy Grøndahl, Danish conductor and composer (died 1960)
- 16 November – Helmer Alexandersson, Swedish composer and violinist (died 1927)

== Deaths ==
- 15 October – Vilhelm Christian Holm, Danish composer (born 1820)
- 1 December – Isak Albert Berg, Swedish operatic tenor, singing teacher and composer (born 1803)

== See also ==
- 1880s in Danish music
- 1886 in Norwegian music
- 1886 in Sweden
