= Nu ska vi sjunga =

1943 Swedish songbook

- 1977-2024 edition
- Illustrator: Elsa Beskow
- Language: Swedish
- Set in: Sweden
- Published: 1943
- Publisher: Almqvist & Wiksell
- Publication place: Sweden

Nu ska vi sjunga is a songbook published in 1943 by the Almqvist & Wiksell publishing company for Swedish primary schools. Songs marked with * are meant to be sung in the third grade. The book was published on the initiative of Alice Tegnér.

== Songs ==
=== I Årstiderna (seasons) ===
- Årstiderna
- Liten vårvisa
- Alla fåglar kommit re'n
- Göken ropar högt uti skogen
- Månaderna
- När kommer våren?
- Nu är det vår
- En vårvintersaga
- Majas visa
- Vårvisa
- Lilla Ingas sommarvisa
- Den första sommarvinden
- Plocka svamp
- Kantareller (Har du sett herr Kantarell?)
- En vintervisa
- Se opp!
- Kälkbacksvisa
- Sommar, vinter, vår och höst
- I snöfall
- Avsked till vintern

=== II Visor om djur och blommor (songs about animals and flowers) ===
- Bä, bä vita lamm
- Djurvisa
- Snick, Snack, Snäcka
- Morgonvisa
- Fågelungen
- Vita svanar
- Fjäril'n på ängen
- Visan om humlorna
- Imse vimse spindeln
- Biet
- Gräshoppan
- Bonden och kråkan
- Rim för smått folk
- För de minsta
- Katten och råttan
- Katten och svansen
- Barnvisa
- Katten och sparven
- Familjen Krokodil
- Fyra små grisar
- Kossorna på bete
- Mickel du en gås har stulit
- Fröken Kissekatt och herr Max von Tax
- Vid Kattegatt
- Positivspelaren
- Mors lilla Olle
- Ekorren
- Vaggvisa
- Blåsippor
- Vårlöken
- Rosendröm
- Rosenknoppen
- Videvisan
- Skogsblommorna till barnen
- Akta skogen
- Lilla Tusselago
- Linblommornas visa
- Fjäril'n vingad syns på Haga
- Bröllopsfesten

=== III Lekvisor (songs for games) ===
- Klockan tolv
- Vart ska du gå?
- Barnen leka "mamma och barn" (Goddag min fru)
- Lille vedhuggaren
- Majas vaggvisa för dockan
- Baka kaka
- Tre pepparkaksgubbar
- Kära lilla Lisen
- Hej hopp i gröna hagen!
- Poliskonstapeln
- Trafiklek
- Flygvisa
- Vill ni veta
- Sotarvisa
- Leka skola
- Elev och lärarinna
- Danslåt
- Regndropparna
- Arbetsbyte
- Kungens lilla piga
- Små grodorna
- Trollmors vaggsång
- Trollfar i Snurreberget
- Tummeliten
- Annikas visa

=== IV Vandringsvisor (hiking songs) ===
- I skogen
- Vandringsvisa
- Marschlek, (När jag sist gick ut att vandra)
- Marsch
- Rida vall
- Vaktparaden
- Hemåt i regnväder
- Sommarvandring
- Traskvisa
- En vandringslåt
- När jag gick ut på vandringsstråt
- Vi gå över daggstänkta berg

=== V Julsånger (Christmas songs) ===
- Julafton
- När juldagsmorgon glimmar
- Nu lyser julens stjärna klar
- Juleklockor
- Liten julvisa (Raska fötter springa tripp tripp, tripp)
- Julsång
- Välkommen du härliga juletid
- Nu är det jul
- Julpolskan
- Kring julgranen (Nu så är det jul igen)
- Nu tändas tusen juleljus
- Julsång
- Tomtarnas julnatt
- Julpolska
- Luciasång

=== VI Kanon (canon) ===
- Kyrkklockorna
- Skolklockan
- Huru högt
- Morgonsolen redan strålar
- Glad och god
- Gott humör
- All vår början
- Musiken
- Glatt framåt marschera
- Dansvisa
- Upp kamrater
- Vi gratulera
- Posten kommer
- Hatten

=== VII Andra vackra sånger och visor (other beautiful songs and ballads) ===
- Lasse liten
- Mors namnsdag
- Stinas pepparkakssoldat
- Sockerbagaren
- Nisse tänker sjöman bli
- Den lille Nisse reste
- En lite körsven
- Karl skall jaga
- När Olle fick heta Pilleman
- Anders Lasse och hans gris
- Sparman far till läger
- Lille John Blund
- Lyckans land (Vid en väg på en sten)
- Kvällsvisa
- Blinka lilla stjärna
- Himlen är av stjärnor full
- Solvisa
- Solstrålen
- Jesus och barnen
- Psalm för barn
- Gud, som haver barnen kär
- Hosianna
- Jag lyfter ögat mot himmelen
- Du gamla, du fria
- Kungssången
- Jag är så glad att jag är svensk
