= 1955 in Nordic music =

The following is a list of notable events and compositions of the year 1955 in Nordic music.

== Events ==
- 1 June – The 3rd Bergen International Festival opens in Bergen, Norway, running until 15 June.

== New works ==
- Einar Englund – Piano Concerto No. 1
- Vagn Holmboe
  - String Quartet No. 5, Op. 66
  - Cantata No. 9
- Per Nørgård – Symphony No. 1 Sinfonia austera

== Popular music ==
- Karl Gerhard – "Så var det med det lilla helgonet"
- Åsta Hjelm – "Teddyen min", recorded by Lille Grethe
- Johan Øian & Alf Prøysen – "Nøtteliten"
- Evert Taube – "Anttilan keväthuumaus" (Finnish translation)

== Film music ==
- Harry Arnold & Sverre Bergh – Ute blåser sommarvind
- Lars-Erik Larsson – Enhörningen
- Poul Schierbeck – Ordet

== Musical films ==
- Danssalongen, with music by Gunnar Lundén-Welden & Charlie Norman

== Births ==
- 8 August – Diddú, Icelandic singer
- 30 December – Sanne Salomonsen, Danish singer and songwriter

== Deaths ==
- 10 April – Oskar Lindberg, Swedish church musician and composer (born 1884)
- 13 April – Davida Afzelius-Bohlin, Swedish operatic mezzo-soprano (born 1866)
- 25 July – Ilmari Hannikainen, Finnish composer (born 1892; drowned)
- 26 October – Arne Eggen, Norwegian composer and organist (born 1881)
- 15 November – David Wikander, Swedish composer (born 1884)

== See also ==
- 1955 in Denmark
- 1955 in Iceland
- 1955 in Norwegian music
- 1955 in Sweden
