= 1885 in Nordic music =

The following is a list of notable events that occurred in the year 1885 in Nordic music.

== Events ==
- unknown date
  - Finn Jean Sibelius, already a budding composer, passes his final school examination, qualifying him for university.
  - Swedish music teacher Alice Sandström marries Jakob Tegnér.

== New works ==
- Edvard Grieg – Holberg Suite (expanded version for string orchestra)
- Robert Kajanus – Aino
- Jean Sibelius – String Quartet in E-flat major
- August Winding – Concert Overture, Op. 14 (published)

== Popular music ==
- Carl Boberg – O Store Gud (written; published the following year)

== Births ==
- 6 March – Hildor Lundvik, Swedish musician and composer (died 1951)
- 11 August – Lilly Kajanus-Blenner, Finnish harpist, daughter of Robert Kajanus (died 1963)
- 15 October – Fridtjof Backer-Grøndahl, Norwegian pianist, composer and music teacher (died 1959)
- 6 December – Helge Klæstad, Norwegian Supreme Court judge and composer (died 1965)

== Deaths ==
- 11 February – Niels Peter Hillebrandt, Danish organist and composer (born 1831)
- 28 March – Ludvig Norman, Swedish pianist, conductor and composer (born 1831)
- 17 July – Søffren Degen, Danish guitarist and composer (born 1816)
- 21 November – Amalia Redec, Swedish pianist, teacher and composer (born 1810)

== See also ==
- 1880s in Danish music
- 1885 in Norwegian music
- 1885 in Sweden
