= Kring julgranen =

Song
- Language: Swedish
- Published: 1899
- Genre: children, Christmas
- Songwriter: Alice Tegnér
- Composer: Alice Tegnér

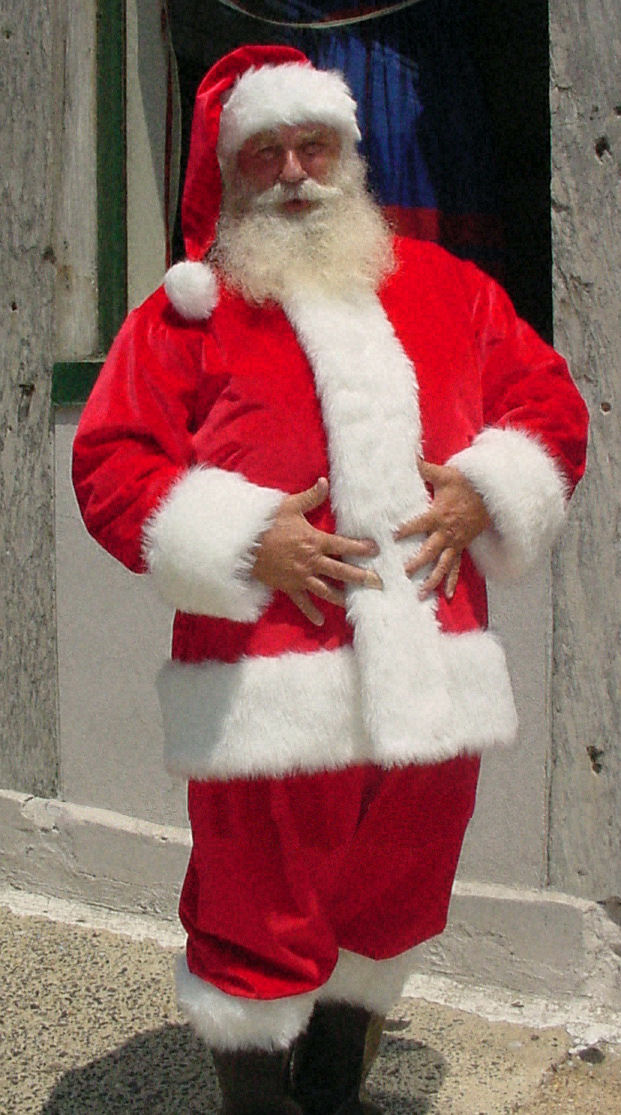
References to Christmas and Santa Claus have led to Christmas associations of a song describing seasons changing in a Nordic agricultural society.

Kring julgranen, also known as Nu så är det jul igen, jultomten myser, is a Christmas song written by Alice Tegnér, and originally published in 1899 in volume 5 of Sjung med oss, mamma!.

The song, which has three verses, describes nature and seasonal change in a Nordic agricultural society, but the song lyrics of the first and second verse have led to the song being associated with Christmas. Even the final verse refers to Christmas.

== Publications ==
- Sjung med oss, mamma! (volume 5), 1899
- Nu ska vi sjunga, 1943, under the lines "Julsånger".

== Recordings ==
An early recording was done by Margareta Schönström-Modéen in Stockholm in May 1926, and on the record "Rida ranka" in November that year. The song was also recorded by Glenmarks on the 1974 album Jul a la carte. and by Anita Lindblom on the 1975 Christmas album Jul med tradition. and by Peter Himmelstrand, also 1975, on a "Nu ska vi sjunga"-themed album.

The song has also been recorded in Spanish by Maria Llerena as "Ya es Navidad" on the 1988 album Chiquitico mio.
