= Sockerbagaren =

Song
- Language: Danish, Swedish
- Published: 1895 (Tegnér version)
- Genre: children, Christmas
- Songwriters: Anonymous, Alice Tegnér
- Composer: Alice Tegnér

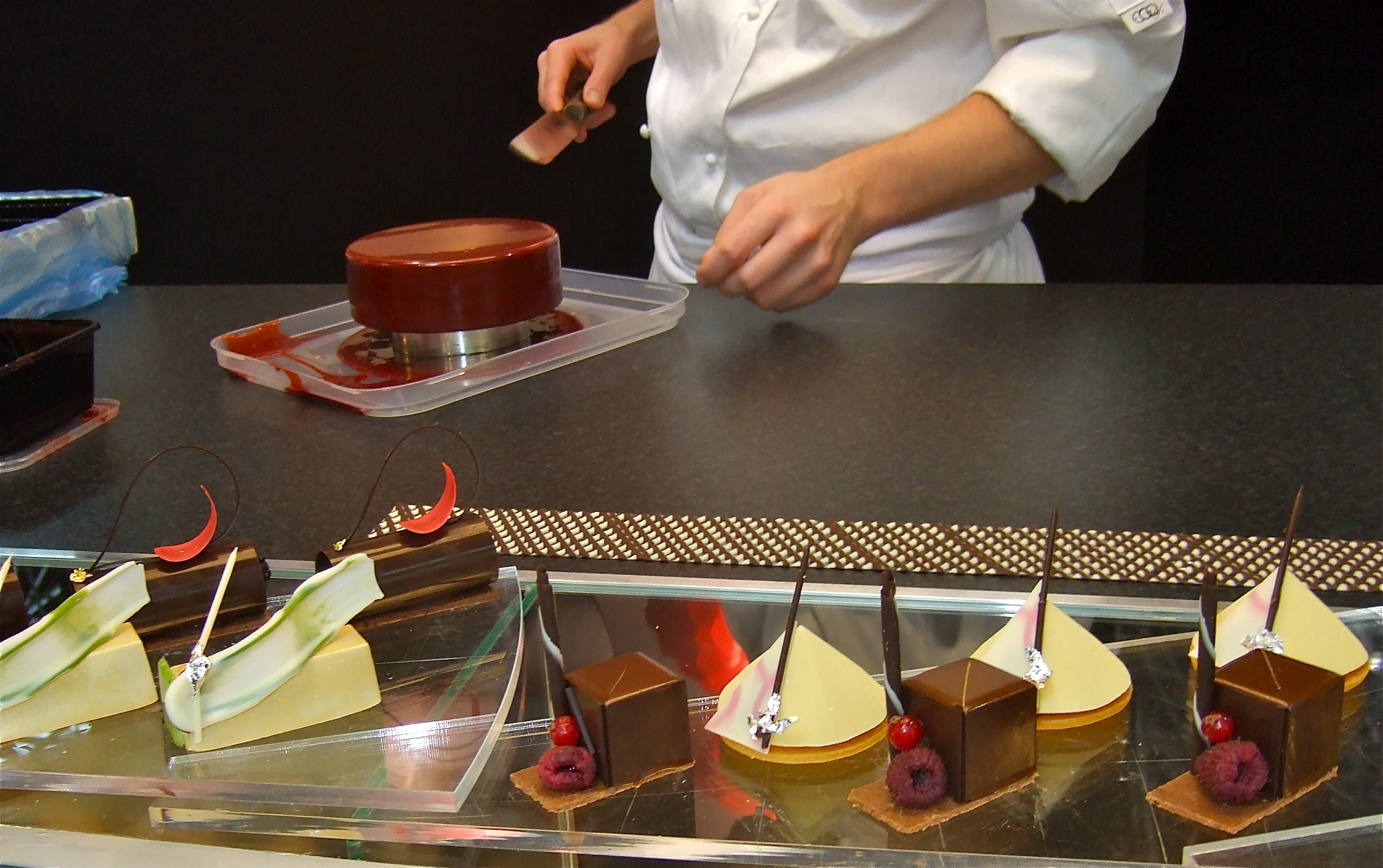
The song lyrics refer to a pastry chef.

Sockerbagaren (The Pastry Chef), is a song written and composed by Swedish composer Alice Tegnér. It was first published in volume 3 of the song book series Sjung med oss, mamma! (Sing with us, mom) in 1895.

The song's lyrics refer to a pastry chef. The final lines were originally; "Och har du pengar så kan du få, men har du inga så får du gå" ("And if you have money you can have some, but if you have none you have to leave). Elsa Beskow, who illustrated many of Alice Tegnér's songbooks, is said to have disliked this, and proposed instead the lyrics be replaced with "Och är du snäller så kan du få, men är du stygger så får du gå" ("And if you are nice you can have some, but if you are naughty you have to leave"). The song is heavily associated with Saint Lucy and Christmas, with references to "Christmas tree" decorations and "gingerbread".

A Danish version of the song also exists, with the title "Der bor en bager på Nørregade" (There lives a baker at Nørregade).

== Publications ==
- Sjung med oss, Mamma! 3, 1895
- Nu ska vi sjunga, 1943, under the lines "Andra vackra sånger och visor".

== Recordings ==
An early recording is dated February 1901, with children’s voices and female speaking, but was never released commercially. Another early recording was done by a girls' choir in Solna in April 1931 and released in November that year. In 1990 the song was released by Kurt Olsson with Damorkestern at Julkurt med damorkestern and the writers Anders Jacobsson and Sören Olsson on God jul från Bert och Sune

The song has also been recorded in Spanish by Maria Llerena as "El dulcero" on 1988 album Chiquitico mio.

== Other versions ==
- The song has been parodized, as Punkrockaren (The punk rocker, from the Lindeman’s Punkrockare Trindeman Lindeman) and En pilsnerdrickare. (A pilsner drinker)
- Trazan och Banarne performed the song lyrics to the melody of Some of These Days, which even Kerstin Axelsson and Margaretha Evmark did in 2007.
