= Årstiderna =

Song
- Language: Swedish
- Published: 1897
- Songwriter: Alice Tegnér

Årstiderna (English: "Seasons"), also known after the opening words Om våren, om våren, is a song written by Alice Tegnér, published in Sjung med oss, mamma!, volume 4 in 1897. Each of the verses represents one of the four seasons, the first taking spring, the second summer, the third autumn, and the last winter. Season songs have since the late 19th century been a common theme in children's songbooks, and in 1943 the song was the first song in the Nu ska vi sjunga songbooks.

== Publications ==
- Sjunga med oss, Mamma! 4, 1897;
- Nu ska vi sjunga, 1943, under the lines "Årstiderna".

== Recordings ==
An early recording was made in Stockholm in January 1929 by Märta Ekström, with Otto Nordlund playing the piano, and was released as a record in September the same year. The song has also been recorded by Ingela "Pling" Forsman on a 1975 record album with songs from "Nu ska vi sjunga".
