= Kriebel =

Kriebel can be both a surname and a middle name. Notable people with this name include:

- Anna Kriebel Vanzo (1881–1926), Norwegian operatic soprano
- Hermann Kriebel (1876–1941), German lieutenant colonel
- Karl Kriebel (1888–1961), German general
