= Tre pepparkaksgubbar =

Song
- Language: Swedish
- Published: 1913
- Genre: Children, Christmas
- Composer: Alice Tegnér
- Lyricist: Astrid Forsell-Gullstrand

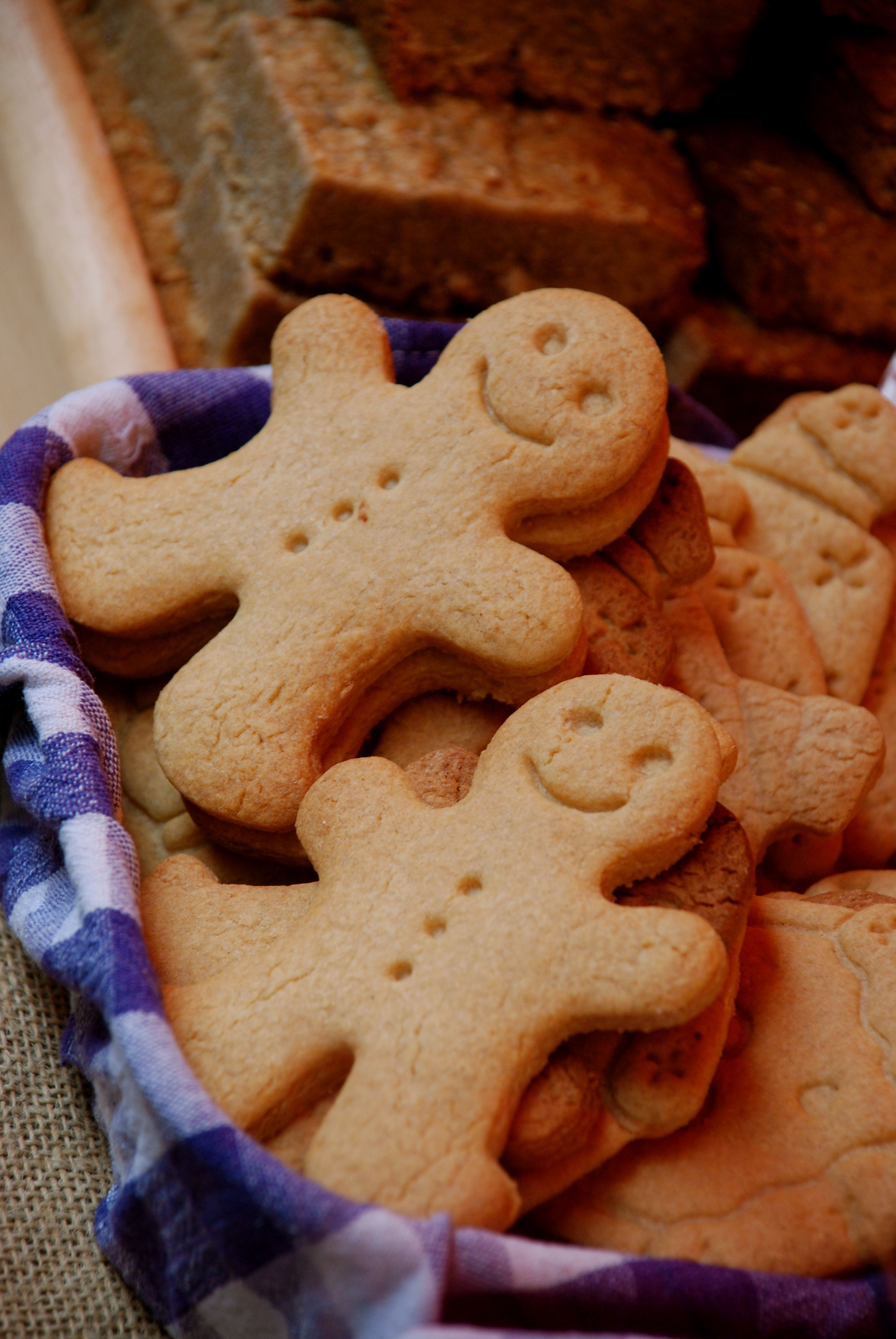
Gingerbread men

"Tre pepparkaksgubbar", also known as "Vi komma, vi komma från Pepparkakeland", is a Swedish Christmas song with lyrics by Astrid Forsell-Gullstrand and music by Alice Tegnér. The song was originally published in 1913, both in Bärina Hallonhätta och andra visor and volume 6 of Alice Tegnér's Sjung med oss, Mamma!.

== Plot ==
The song describes three gingerbread men with eyes out of zante currants, who tell about themselves come walking from gingerbread land at Christmastime. During Saint Lucy's processions, the song is sung by boys dressed as gingerbread men.

== Publications ==
- Sjung med oss, Mamma!|Sjung med oss, Mamma! 6, 1913
- Nu ska vi sjunga, 1943, under the lines "Lekvisor"

== Recordings ==
An early recording was done by a girls' choir in Solna in April 1931, and released in November that year. The song has also been recorded by Ingela "Pling" Forsman, Mona Wessman and Peter Himmelstrand on a 1975 album with "Nu ska vi sjunga" theme.

The song has also been recorded in Spanish by Maria Llerena as "Tres viejos del paiz de los bizchochos" on the 1988 album Chiquitico mio.
