= 1892 in Nordic music =

The following is a list of notable events that occurred in the year 1892 in Nordic music.

== Events ==
- Spring – Swedish singer Esther Gadelius performs songs by Helena Munktell in a concert series by the Société Nationale de Musique in Paris, France.
- 8 April – Carl Nielsen's String Quartet No. 2 is performed in public for the first time, in Copenhagen.
- 28 April – Jean Sibelius conducts the world première of his Kullervo Symphony in Helsinki. Finnish singers Abraham Ojanperä (baritone) and Emmy Achté (mezzo-soprano) perform the solo roles.
- 18 October – Swedish operatic soprano Wilhelmina Strandberg, while appearing as the Marquise in La fille du régiment to celebrate the 25th anniversary of the Swedish Royal Opera, is awarded the Litteris et Artibus medal.

== Works ==
- Valborg Aulin – Valse élégiaque
- Edvard Grieg – 6 Songs with Orchestra, including an arrangement of "Solveig's Song"
- Jean Sibelius
  - En saga
  - Kullervo

== Popular music ==
- Lars Oftedal – "Kven kan seia ut den gleda"
- Carl Leopold Sjöberg – "Tonerna" (date composed)
- Alice Tegnér – "Borgmästar' Munthe" (setting of nursery rhyme)
- Anders Vassbotn – "Å leva det er å elska" page 447

== Births ==
- 4 February – Yrjö Kilpinen, Finnish composer specialising in lieder (died 1959)
- 9 May – Eric Westberg, Swedish composer (died 1944)
- 5 June – Carsten Carlsen, Norwegian pianist and composer (died 1961).
- 21 June – Hilding Rosenberg, Swedish composer (died 1985)
- 15 August – Knud Jeppesen, Danish musicologist (died 1974)
- 19 October – Ilmari Hannikainen, Finnish pianist and composer (died 1955)

== Deaths ==
- 11 February – Erik Siboni, Danish organist and composer (died 1828)

== See also ==
- 1892 in Denmark
- 1892 in Norwegian music
- 1892 in Sweden
