= 1959 in Nordic music =

The following is a list of notable events and compositions of the year 1959 in Nordic music.

== Events ==
- 29 January – Melodifestivalen, an annual Swedish music competition that determines the country's representative for the Eurovision Song Contest, is held for the first time, in Stockholm.
- 12 March – The 4th Eurovision Song Contest is held in France. Denmark (5th) and Sweden (9th) are the only Scandinavian countries to compete.
- unknown date – Icelandic new-music collective Musica Nova is founded by Magnús Blöndal Jóhannsson and others.

== New works ==
- Erik Bergman – Aton
- Sven-Erik Bäck – A Game around a Game
- Niels Viggo Bentzon – Piano Sonata No. 7, op. 121

== Popular music ==
- Sven Gyldmark – "Bornholmervalsen", performed by Ib Mossin
- Per Martin Hamberg – "Nu tändas åter ljusen i min lilla stad"

== New recordings ==
- Louis Armstrong – Americans in Sweden

== Film music ==
- Sven Gyldmark
  - Far til fire på Bornholm
  - Vi er allesammen tossede
- Maj Sønstevold – Støv på hjernen

== Musical films ==
- Raggare!, with music by Harry Arnold and others

== Births ==
- 12 January – Per Gessle, Swedish singer, songwriter and guitarist
- 6 August – Sigurd Køhn Norwegian jazz saxophonist, bandleader and composer (died 2004)
- 14 September – Morten Harket, Norwegian singer
- 13 December – Staffan William-Olsson, Swedish jazz musician

== Deaths ==
- 2 March – Yrjö Kilpinen, Finnish composer (born 1892)
- 13 April – Dagmar Hansen, Danish singer and entertainer (born 1871)
- 21 April – Hakon Andersen, Danish organist and composer (born 1875)
- 30 April – Daniel Andersen, Danish composer, sculptor and ceramist (born 1885)
- 3 June – Ole Windingstad, Norwegian pianist, conductor and composer (born 1886)
- 21 June – Fridtjof Backer-Grøndahl, Norwegian pianist, composer and music teacher (born 1885).
- 7 August – Armas Launis, Finnish composer and ethnomusicologist (born 1884)

== See also ==
- 1959 in Denmark
- 1959 in Iceland
- 1959 in Norwegian music
- 1959 in Sweden
