= 1965 in Nordic music =

The following is a list of notable events and compositions of the year 1965 in Nordic music.

== Events ==
- 19 February – With 1965 designated "Sibelius Year", marked by greetings from US President Lyndon Johnson, composer and conductor Leonard Bernstein organises a Young People's Concert devoted to the composer's work.
- 21 March – The 10th Eurovision Song Contest is held in Italy, and is won by Luxembourg. Sweden participate after a year's absence, finishing in 10th place. Of the remaining Scandinavian countries, Denmark finish 7th, Norway 13th and Denmark joint 15th with no votes
- unknown date – Tauno Marttinen is awarded a Pro Finlandia medal.

== New works ==
- Laci Boldemann – Svart är vitt (opera)
- Gunnar Bucht – Strängaspel
- Gösta Nystroem – Symphony No. 6 ("Sinfonia Tramontana")
- Yngve Sköld – String Quartet no. 3

== Popular music ==
- Reino Helismaa & Toivo Kärki – "Reppu ja reissumies", performed by Tapio Rautavaara
- Vince Taylor – "Brand New Cadillac", performed by Hep Stars (#1 Sweden)

== New recordings ==
- Monica Zetterlund – Ohh! Monica

== Eurovision Song Contest ==
- Denmark in the Eurovision Song Contest 1965
- Finland in the Eurovision Song Contest 1965
- Norway in the Eurovision Song Contest 1965
- Sweden in the Eurovision Song Contest 1965

== Film music ==
- Bent Fabricius-Bjerre – Slå først Frede!

== Births ==
- 18 July – Veli-Matti Puumala, Finnish composer
- 26 October – Sakari Oramo, Finnish conductor
- 21 November – Björk, Icelandic singer-songwriter

== Deaths ==
- 11 January – Arne Bjørndal, Norwegian hardingfele fiddler, composer and folklorist (born 1882).
- 7 April – David Hellström, songwriter (born 1883)
- 23 May – Helge Klæstad, Norwegian composer (born 1885)
- 3 June – Herbert Janssen, German operatic baritone of Swedish parentage (born 1892)
- 4 July – Valdemar Eiberg, Danish jazz musician (born 1892)

== See also ==
- 1965 in Denmark
- 1965 in Iceland
- 1965 in Norwegian music
- 1965 in Sweden
