= Julpolskan =

Song
- Language: Swedish
- Genre: Christmas
- Songwriter: Anna-Lisa Frykman

Julpolskan, also known as Julen den glada går åter omkring på Jorden, is a Christmas song with lyrics and music by Anna-Lisa Frykman. Song lyrics describe several Christmas traditions.

== Publications ==
- Nu ska vi sjunga, 1943, under the lines "Julsånger".

== Recordings ==
In 1989, Tommy Körberg & Orsa spelmän recorded the song on the Christmas album Julen är här. In this version, the song's only verse is sung twice.
