= Jag lyfter ögat mot himmelen =

Swedish and Finnish Christian hymn

- Genre: Hymn
- Written: 1857
- Text: by Johan Ludvig Runeberg
- Language: Swedish
- Melody: Oskar Lindberg (1917); Rudolf Lagi (1867)
- Published: 1886

"Jag lyfter ögat mot himmelen" is a hymn from 1857 with lyrics by Johan Ludvig Runeberg. It was introduced to the Finnish hymnal in 1886, using an 1883 translation. In Finnish, it is called "Mä silmät luon ylös taivaaseen". The hymn also appears twice in the Swedish hymnal of 1986.

The music used in the Finnish hymnals, and for the Finnish-language hymnals in Sweden, was composed by Rudolf Lagi in 1867. The Swedish hymnal of 1986 uses music composed by Oskar Lindberg in 1917. The hymn also appears twice in the Swedish hymnal of 1986.

== Publication ==
- Virsikirja (1886)
- Number 158 in Svensk söndagsskolsångbok (1908) under the heading Böne- och lovsånger.
- Number 162 in Lilla Psalmisten (1909) under the heading Bönesånger.
- Number 223 in Svensk söndagsskolsångbok (1929) under the heading Barndoms- och ungdomstiden.
- Number 515 in Den svenska psalmboken (1937) under the heading Barn.
- Number 477 in Virsikirja (1938)
- Number 486 in Finlandssvenska psalmboken (1943)
- Nu ska vi sjunga (1943) under the heading Andra vackra sånger och visor.
- Number 678 in Frälsningsarméns sångbok (1968) under the heading Barn och ungdom.
- Number 490 in Virsikirja (1986)
- Number 492 in Finlandssvenska psalmboken (1986)
- Number 210 in Den svenska psalmboken (1986), Cecilia (1986), Psalmer och Sånger (1987), Segertoner (1988) and Frälsningsarméns sångbok (1990) under the heading Bönen.
- Number 647 in Den svenska psalmboken (1986), with versions in both languages under the heading Från Finland.
