= Tomtarnas julnatt =

Song
- Language: Swedish
- Published: 1898
- Genre: children, Christmas
- Songwriter: Alfred Smedberg
- Composer: Vilhelm Sefve-Svensson

Tomtarnas julnatt, also known as Midnatt råder or Tipp tapp, is a Christmas song with lyrics by Alfred Smedberg (under the pseudonyme "Tippu Tipp"), and music by Vilhelm Sefve-Svensson (under the pseudonym "Vilh. Sefve"). The song was originally published in the children's magazine Jultomten in 1898, and has then been re-published several times. In 1916 it was published in 115 sånger för de små. According to song researcher Lennart Kjellgren the crediting of Sefve for the music is uncertain (1999).

The song has eight verses, and describes the Christmas gnomes on Christmas eve. Originally the opening lines were "Midnatt råder, det är tyst i husen", which nowadays has been replaced with "Midnatt råder, tyst det är i husen". The following-up lines "tyst i husen", however, still remain.

In pre-school and at school, the song has become popular, and is often dramatized during the Saint Lucy processions with children dressed up like Christmas gnomes, but the song can also be used as a finger game. During Saint Lucy processions, the Christmas gnomes (tomtenisse) often do their entrance to this song. The chorus are often heard loudly, because children easily can memorize it.

== Publication ==
- Nu ska vi sjunga, 1943, under the lines "Julsånger".
- Lek med toner, 1971
- Julens önskesångbok, 1997, under the lines "Traditionella julsånger"
- Barnens svenska sångbok, 1999, under the lines "Året runt".

== Recording ==
An early recording was done by Nadja Hjärne Ohrberg and Stig Holm's ensemble on 28 September 1945, and released on record in December that year. The song was also recorded by Lill Lindfors on her 1991 Christmas album En Lillsk jul.

== Literature ==
- Nils Sandberg, En sagoberättares bibliografi, i: Västgötalitteratur, 1984, page 10-11
- Sven-Evert Gustafsson, Alfred Smedberg och hans västgötska hembygd, i: Västgötalitteratur, 1984, page 98-99
