= Alfred Smedberg =

Swedish writer

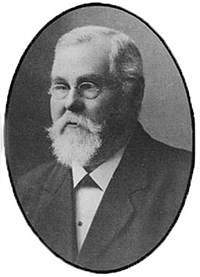
Image of Alfred Smedberg

Alfred Smedberg (22 July 1850 - 18 October 1925) was a Swedish author of children's books. He was born in Väddåkra in Västergötland. His father Josef Smedberg (1819–90) was a farmer and member of parliament.

Alfred studied to become a schoolteacher in Växjö from 1873 to 1877 and in 1878 became a teacher in Norrköping, where he stayed until reaching pensionable age in 1910. He started publishing stories and poems in magazines in the 1890s. His first book, Minnen från skogsroten (Memories from the roots of the forest) came out in 1906 and his last, Guldäpplen på silvertråd (Golden apples on silver thread) was published posthumously in 1927.

Many of Smedberg's stories originate from tales of elves, trolls and witches that he had heard as a child. He is arguably most well known for the poem Tomtarnas julnatt (also known as Midnatt råder or Tipp tapp) which is often featured in school or pre-school St. Lucy's Day festivities.

== Bibliography ==
- 1912 – Branta stigar - korta berättelser ur livet.
- 1913 – Framåt och uppåt.
- 1915 – Lustigt folk - berättelser, skisser och kulturbilder.
- 1916 – Solljus och morgondagg - Sannsagor och äventyrshistorier berättade för de unga.
- 1917 – Från gamla goda tiden - berättelser ur livet.
- 1920 – Skatten i slottsmuren jämte andra berättelser för ungdom.
