= En Lillsk jul =

Studio album by Lill Lindfors
- Released: 1991
- Genre: Christmas, schlager
- Length: 36 minutes
- Label: Ladybird

Lill Lindfors chronology
Glädjor (1990)	En Lillsk jul (1991)	Salomos høysang (1995)

En Lillsk jul is a 1991 Christmas album by Lill Lindfors. It was re-released in 1995.

== Track listing ==
=== Side A ===
1. Klang min vackra bjällra
2. Knalle Juls vals
3. Det är en ros utsprungen
4. Tända ljus i alla fönster
5. Jag gick mig ut en afton
6. Den första julen

=== Side B ===
1. Jungfrun hon går i dansen (Zum Tanze da ging ein Mädel)
2. Nu tändas tusen juleljus
3. Midnatt råder
4. Nu har vi ljus-medley
5. Du tycker du är vacker
6. Stilla natt (Stille Nacht, helige Nacht)

== Personnel ==
- Johan Norberg - guitar
- Sam Bengtsson - bass
- Klas Anderhell - drums
- Peter Ljung - keyboard
- Hector Bingert - flute
