= Här är polisen =

Song
- Genre: children
- Songwriters: Stina Nyström, Nils-Henrik Nyström

"Här är polisen", also called "Poliskonstapeln", is a children's song written by Stina Nyström and Nils-Henrik Nyström. Depicting the role of the police in traffic and society, the song was criticized in the 1970s for scaring children with the police, as in the second to last verse of the song.

== Recordings ==
An early recording was done by Nadja Hjärne-Ohrberg with Stig Holm's ensemble on 28 September 1945, and the record came out in December the same year. The song has also been recorded by the Swedish police force themselves, with the Motala police male choir and Lennart Djärf on the 1980 album Till glädje.

== Publication ==
- Nu ska vi sjunga, 1943, under the lines "Lekvisor"
