= Karin Langebo =

Swedish opera singer and harpist (1927–2019)

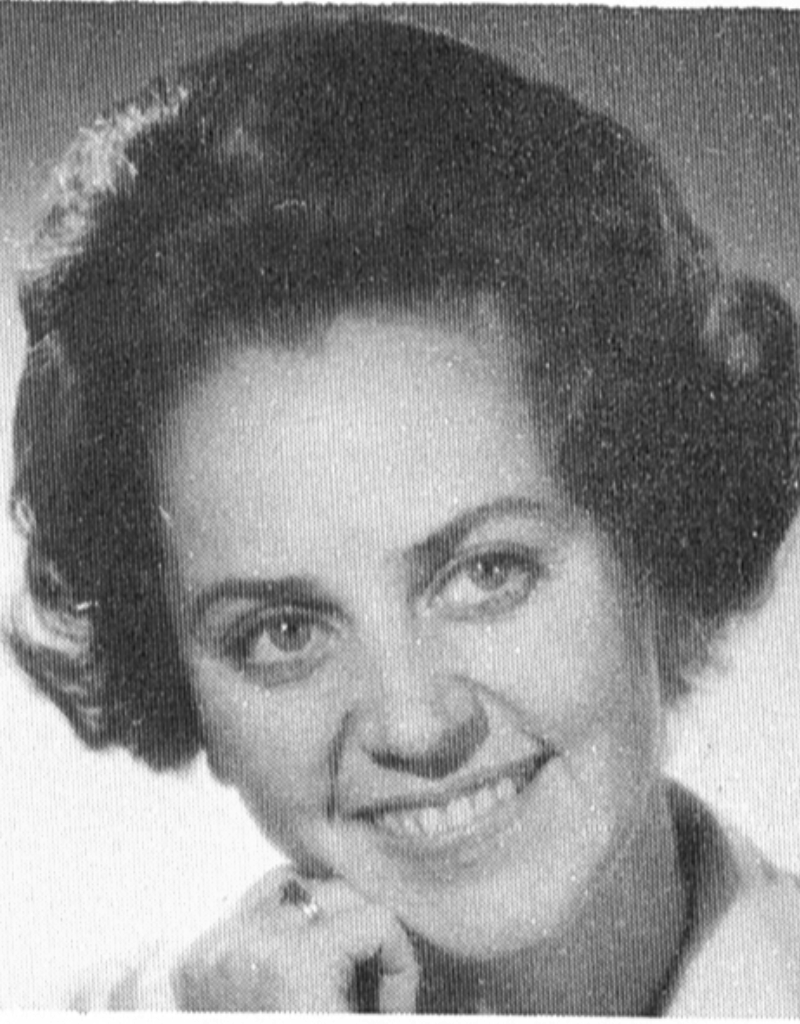
Karen Langebo

Karin Hillevi Langebo-Lilliebjörn (1927–2019) was a Swedish soprano opera singer, harpist and voice teacher. She made her stage debut in 1956 at the Drottningholm Palace Theatre as Ninetta in Mozart's opera buffa La finta semplice. In addition to performing roles at the Royal Swedish Opera, from 1962 to 1966 she was engaged by the Norwegian National Opera. She also performed as a harpist with various orchestras and was a member of the Swedish radio choir.

== Early life and family ==
Born in Skellefteå on 5 October 1927, Karin Hillevi Langebo was the daughter of the organist and choirmaster Simon Konrad Langebo and his wife Vivi Antoinette Karolina née Andersson, a church singer. From 1946 to 1953, she attended the Royal College of Music in Stockholm where she studied singing, opera and the harp and graduated as a music teacher. A student of the soprano Hjördis Schymberg, she also studied in Salzburg, Paris and Vienna. In 1953, she married Lars Gunnar Enar Lilliebjörn with whom she had a son, Peter.

== Career ==
Enjoying grants both as an opera singer and a harpist from the Royal Opera, she performed in a number of different roles, including Lucia in Benjamin Britten's The Rape of Lucretia. Performing both classical and modern roles, in 1963 she appeared in the first production of Ingvar Lidholm's Nausikaa ensam. Performing at the Norwegian Opera from the early 1960s, she is remembered as Mimi in Puccini's La bohème, Rosalina in Johann Strauss' Die Fledermaus and in the title role of Jacques Offenbach's La belle Hélène.

Langebo also performed in concerts and was a member of the Swedish radio choir in the 1950s. She played the harp in orchestras including the Royal Stockholm Philharmonic Orchestra and The Royal Court Orchestra. In the 1970s and 1980s, she also appeared in various Swedish television shows.

Karin Langebo died in Stockholm on 27 November 2019 and was buried in Danderyd Cemetery in Djursholm.
