= Guy A. Marco =

American musicologist (1927–2022)

Guy Anthony Marco (October 4, 1927, New York — April 5, 2022, Chicago) was an American musicologist, librarian, and academic.

== Career ==
After beginning his education at DePaul University, Marco transferred to the American Conservatory of Music in Chicago where graduated with a Bachelor of Music in 1951. He pursued further studies at the University of Chicago where he earned a MA in music in 1952, an MA in Library Science in 1955, and a PhD in music in 1956.

Marco began his career at the Chicago Musical College; serving as music librarian and an instructor in 1953–1954. He then joined the faculty of Chicago City Junior College where he taught both music and humanities in addition to working as a librarian. In 1960 he joined the faculty of Kent State University as dean of the library science school. He remained in that post for the next seventeen years during which time he developed training specific to music librarians.

In 1977 Marco joined the staff of the Library of Congress (LOC) where he served as the LOC's chief of the general reference and bibliography division. From 1981 to 1983 he was director of the library school at San Jose State University in California. From 1985 to 1989 he worked for the United States Army as chief of library activities at Fort Dix in New Jersey. He then returned to Illinois where he taught on the faculty of Rosary College (now Dominican University) from 1990 through 1996.

As an academic, Marco published journal articles and reviews on 17th- and 18th-century music and on opera and on topics related to library science.
