= Rosa Sucher =

German operatic soprano

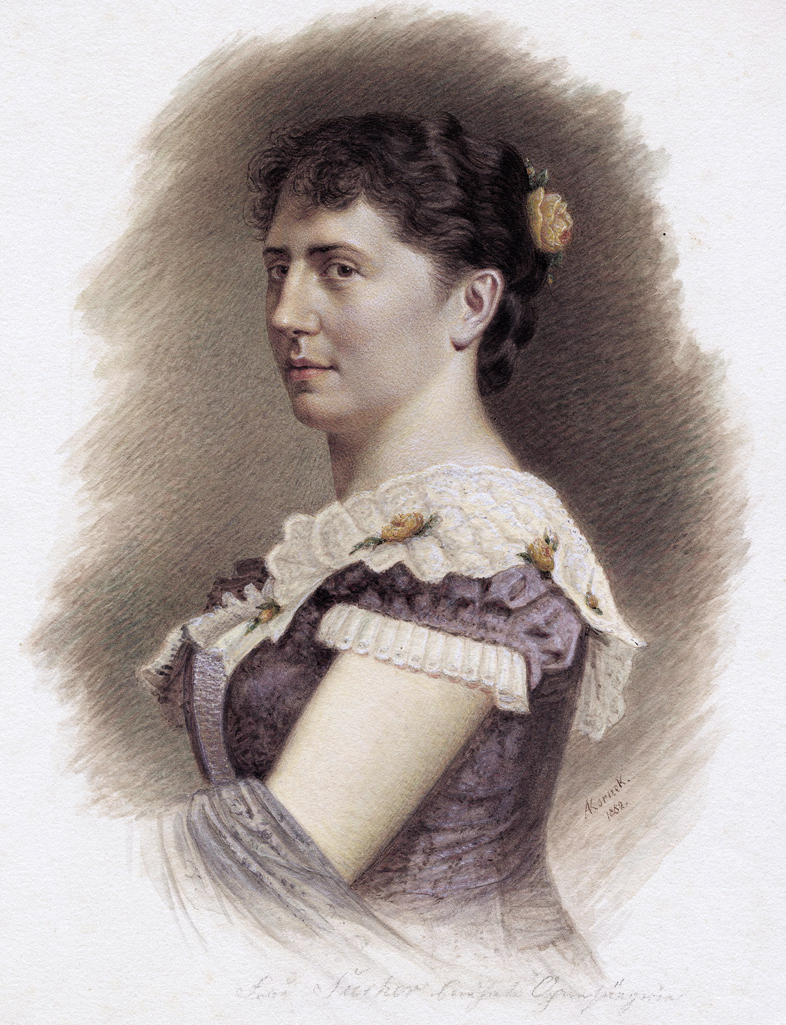
Rosa Sucher (1882)

Rosa Sucher (23 February 1849 – 16 April 1927), née Hasselbeck, was a German operatic dramatic soprano renowned for her Wagnerian performances.

== Life ==
Sucher was born in Velburg on 23 February 1849. Her debut occurred in Munich in 1871 as Waltraute in Die Walküre and engagements followed in Berlin and Leipzig. She married Josef Sucher (1844–1908), a well-known conductor and composer in 1876, when he was conductor at the Leipzig city theatre.

Frau Sucher soon became famous for her interpretations of Wagner's operatic roles, with her seasons in London in 1882 and 1892 proving her great capacity both as singer and actress. In 1886 and 1888, she sang at Germany's Bayreuth, and in later years she was principally associated with the opera stage in Berlin, retiring in 1903. She died at Eschweiler.

Her rendering of the part of Isolde in Wagner's opera was especially acclaimed. Her other roles included Agathe, Euryanthe, Elsa, Eva, Brünnhilde, Kundry, and Desdemona in Otello. Unfortunately, she left no gramophone recordings of her singing.

== Sources ==
Attribution

- The Oxford Dictionary of Opera, by John Warrack and Ewan West (1992), 782 pages, ISBN 0-19-869164-5
