= 1886 in Norwegian music =

The following is a list of notable events and releases of the year 1886 in Norwegian music.

== Births ==
May

- 18 – Ole Windingstad, pianist and composer (died 1959).

== See also ==
- 1886 in Norway
- Music of Norway
