= Davida Afzelius-Bohlin =

Swedish mezzo-soprano

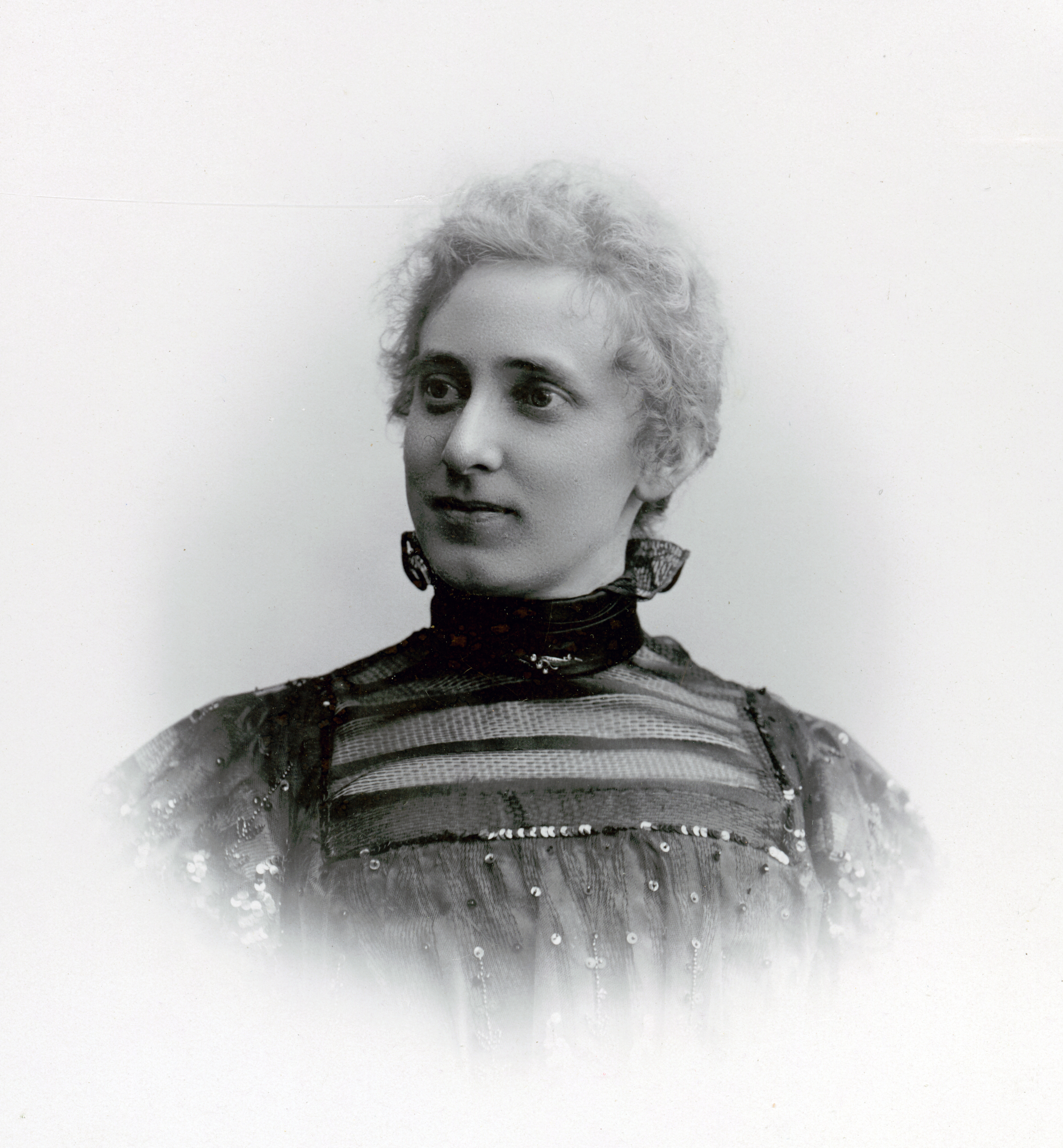
Davida Afzelius (1900)

Davida Carolina Afzelius-Bohlin née Larsson (1866–1955) was a Swedish mezzo-soprano who performed in operas and concerts around the turn of the 20th century. She appeared for the first time when she was 17 at a concert in Gothenburg, the first of many she would give in Sweden and abroad. In May 1900, she made her debut at the Royal Swedish Opera as Amneris in Aida. She was engaged by the Royal Opera until 1902. After marrying the music director Carl Bohlin in 1903, she appeared on occasion as an oratorio and concert singer.

== Biography ==
Born in Gothenburg on 20 December 1866, David Carolina Larsson was the daughter of the farmer Johan Anton Larsson and his wife Hilda née Durchbach. She studied voice in Gothenburg under Andreas Hallén (1882–1883), in Stockholm under Fritz Arlberg (1891–1892) and in Dresden under August Iffert (1896–1898).

She first performed in public when she was 17 at a concert in Gothenburg arranged by Hallen. From 1886 to 1888, she performed in various Stockholm theatres. In 1892, she appeared for the Music Association in Stockholm as the alto in Felix Mendelsohn's oratorio Elijah. Together with the violinist Tor Aulin, the cellist Frans Neruda and the pianist Wilhelm Stenhammar, she went on tour to give recitals abroad in a number of cities including Berlin, Dresden, Braunschweig and Freiburg in Germany.

On 14 May 1900, she made her début at the Royal Swedish Opera as Amneris in Aida. Later the same month, she appeared in the title role of Gluck's Orfeo ed Euridice. She subsequently received an engagement until June 1902, performing roles including Azucena in Il trovatore and Erda in Das Rheingold.

Afzelius-Bohlin was married twice, first from 1885 to 1895 with the Gothenburg doctor Jon Arvid Afzelius (1856–1918) and then in 1903 with the music director Carl Bohlin (1867–1925). After her second marriage, she performed only occasionally, singing in oratorios and giving concert recitals.

She was a member of the women's association Nya Idun.

Davida Carolina Bohlin died in Gothenburg on 13 April 1955.
