= 1927 in country music =

This is a list of notable events in country music that took place in the year 1927.

== Events ==
- July through August –
  - Ralph Peer rents a warehouse in Bristol, Tennessee, for two weeks; the ensuing Bristol sessions produce several hits and introduce Jimmie Rodgers and the Carter Family to America.
  - Rodgers makes his first recordings on August 4 for the Victor Talking Machine Company at Bristol, Tennessee, of "The Soldier's Sweetheart" and "Sleep, Baby, Sleep." The latter did well, but "Sleep" drew little interest, until late in 1927, it took off and became his first hit.
  - The Carter Family's recordings are also made that month; their first release is the double-sided hit "Wandering Boy" and "Poor Orphan Child."
- November 30 – Jimmie Rodgers participates in his second recording session, recording four sides at Camden, New Jersey: "Ben Dewberry's Final Run," "Mother Was a Lady (If Brother Jack Were Here)," "Blue Yodel ('T' for Texas)," and "Away Out on the Mountain."

== Top Hillbilly (Country) Recordings ==
The following songs were extracted from records included in Joel Whitburn's Pop Memories 1890-1954, record sales reported on the "Discography of American Historical Recordings" website, and other sources as specified. Numerical rankings are approximate, they are only used as a frame of reference.

Rank	Artist	Title	Label	Recorded	Released	Chart Positions
1	Carter Family	"Bury Me Under the Weeping Willow"	Victor 21074	August 1, 1927	November 1927	US BB 1927 #101, US #10 for 1 week, 4 total weeks, US Hillbilly 1926 #1
2	Gid Tanner and His Skillet Lickers with Riley Puckett	"John Henry (Steel-Drivin' Man)"	Columbia 15142	March 29, 1927	June 1927	US BB 1927 #248, US #20 for 1 week, 1 total weeks, US Hillbilly 1927 #2
3	Jimmie Rodgers	"Sleep, Baby, Sleep"	Victor 20864	August 4, 1927	November 5, 1927	US Hillbilly 1927 #3
4	Deford Bailey	"Pan American Blues"	Brunswick 146	April 18, 1927	November 1927	US Hillbilly 1927 #4
5	Vernon Dalhart	"Lindbergh (The Eagle of the U.S.A.)"	Columbia 1000	May 24, 1927	June 1927	US BB 1927 #49, US #4 for 1 week, 5 total weeks, US Hillbilly 1927 #5
6	Vernon Dalhart and Carson Robison	"My Carolina Home"	Victor 20795	April 17, 1927	June 1927	US BB 1927 #79, US #7 for 1 week, 4 total weeks, US Hillbilly 1927 #6
7	Vernon Dalhart and Carson Robison	"My Blue Ridge Mountain Home"	Victor 20539	August 24, 1927	November 1927	US BB 1928 #67, US #7 for 1 week, 8 total weeks, US Hillbilly 1927 #7
8	Jimmie Rodgers	"The Soldier's Sweetheart"	Victor 20864	August 4, 1927	November 5, 1927	US BB 1928 #90, US #8 for 1 week, 5 total weeks, US Hillbilly 1927 #8
9	Vernon Dalhart	"Lucky Lindy"	Columbia 1000	May 1, 1927	June 1927	US BB 1927 #137, US #11 for 1 week, 2 total weeks, US Hillbilly 1927 #9
10	Carter Family	"The Poor Orphan Child"	Victor 20877	August 1, 1927	November 18, 1927	US Hillbilly 1927 #10
11	Vernon Dalhart	"The Mississippi Flood"	Victor 20611	April 27, 1927	July 1927	US BB 1927 #207, US #17 for 1 week, 2 total weeks, US Hillbilly 1927 #11
12	The Allen Brothers	"Salty Dog Blues"	Columbia 15175	April 7, 1927	August 12, 1927	US Hillbilly 1927 #12
13	Carter Family	"Single Girl Married Girl"	Victor 20937	August 2, 1927	October 14, 1927	US Hillbilly 1927 #13
14	Uncle Dave Macon and His Fruit-Jar Drinkers	"Sail Away Ladies"	Vocalion 5155	May 7, 1927	June 1927	US Hillbilly 1927 #14
15	Carter Family	"The Storms Are on the Ocean"	Victor 20937	August 1, 1927	October 1927	US Hillbilly 1927 #15
16	Fiddlin' Powers and Family	"Cluck Old Hen"	Edison 52083	October 6, 1925	December 1926	US Hillbilly 1927 #16
17	Ernest Phipps and His Holiness Quartet	"Don't Grieve After Me"	Victor 20834	July 26, 1927	October 10, 1927	US Hillbilly 1927 #17
18	Al Craver (Vernon Dalhart)	"The Wreck Of Number Nine"	Columbia 15121	January 14, 1927	April 1927	US BB 1927 #198, US #16 for 1 week, 2 total weeks, US Hillbilly 1927 #18
19	Gid Tanner and His Skillet Lickers with Riley Puckett	"Run Nigger Run"	Columbia 15158	March 29, 1927	August 1927	US Hillbilly 1927 #19
20	Carter Family	"The Wandering Boy"	Victor 20877	August 2, 1927	November 18, 1927	US Hillbilly 1927 #20

== Births ==
- February 25 – Ralph Stanley, bluegrass pioneer and Grand Ole Opry stalwart (died 2016).
- March 15 – Carl Smith, honky tonk-styled star of the 1950s through 1970s (died 2010).
- July 27 – Charlie Louvin, member of The Louvin Brothers (with brother Ira), and a solo star after their split and Ira's death (died 2011).
- August 12 – Porter Wagoner – enduring Grand Ole Opry star, television host, duet partner of Dolly Parton, singer of hits including "A Satisfied Mind" and "The Carroll County Accident" (died 2007).
- August 17 – E.W. "Bud" Wendell – music executive.
- August 29 – Jimmy C. Newman – Cajun-styled country performer and longtime Grand Ole Opry star (died 2014).
- September 8 – Harlan Howard – Songwriter of many country music standards from the 1950s through 1980s (died 2002).
- October 2 – Leon Rausch, 91, member of The Texas Playboys (died 2019).
- November 8 – Patti Page, crossover female vocalist best known for "Tennessee Waltz" (died 2013).
- December 30 – Bob Ferguson, record producer and songwriter, best known for work with Porter Wagoner and Dolly Parton (died 2001).
