= Auguste Mathieu Panseron =

French composer and voice teacher

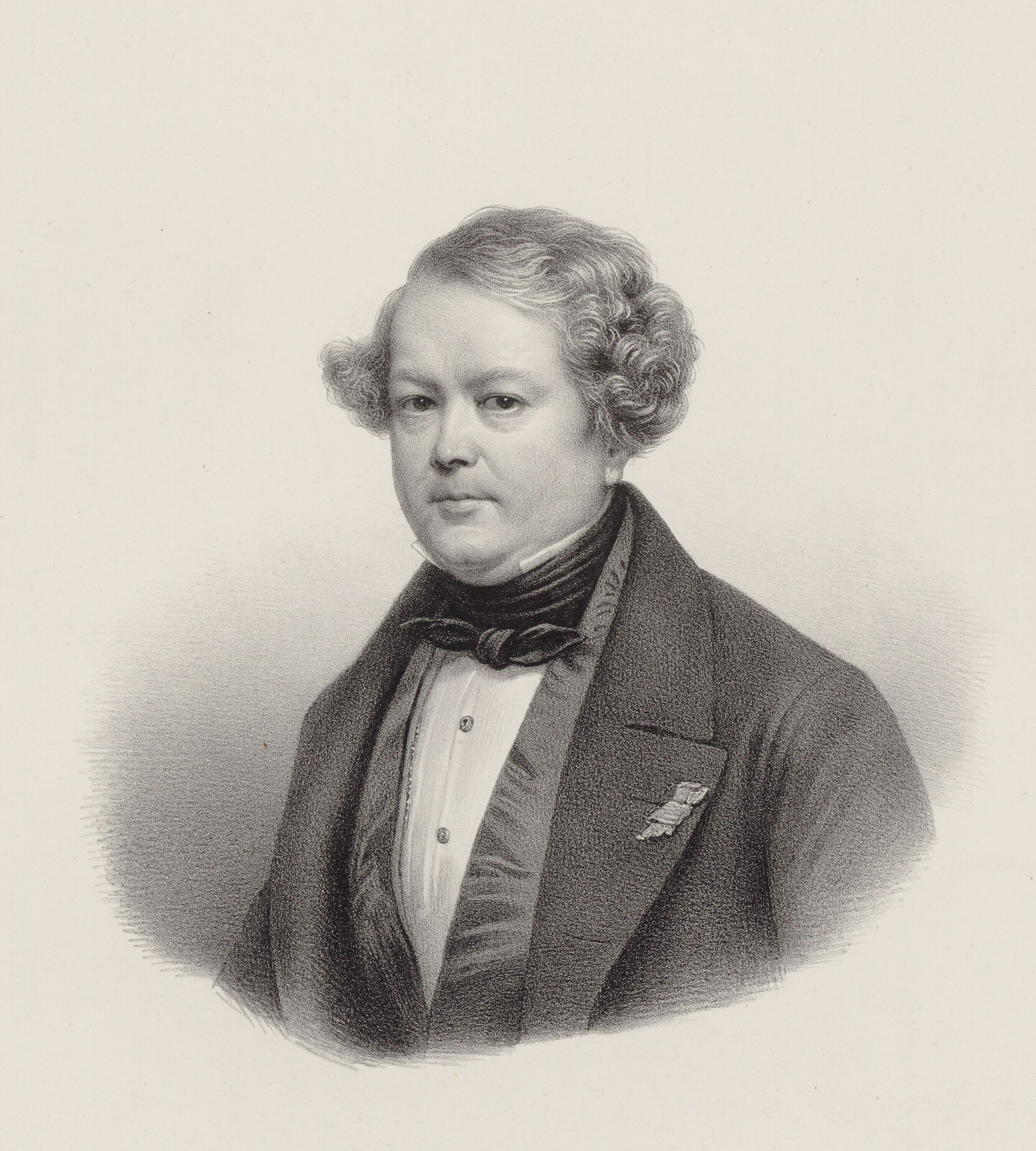
Auguste Mathieu Panseron, ca. 1850.

Auguste Mathieu Panseron (26 April 1796 – 29 July 1859) was a French composer and voice teacher.

== Life ==
Born in Paris, Panseron studied in Vienna with Antonio Salieri, having been accepted by the master thanks to a recommendation by Luigi Cherubini. In 1824, Panseron began teaching singing at the Conservatoire de Paris. Early in his career, he wrote four works for the Opéra-Comique in Paris: La Grille du parc (1820), Les Deux cousines (1821), Le Mariage difficile (1823), and L'École de Rome (1829). Other works for the stage followed. However, he achieved wider recognition as a composer by producing more than 200 popular and patriotic songs, including romances, barcarolles, and chansonettes, and by his large number of religious works in all forms, including seven masses.

Panseron gained a lasting reputation with his pedagogical works, many of which continue to be published and used today. These include his Méthode complète de vocalisation, in editions for all categories of voice; solfège exercises in editions for solo voice, vocal ensembles, piano, and violin; vocalises; and other specialized exercises.

He died in Paris aged 65.
