= 1959 in Norwegian music =

The following is a list of notable events and releases of the year 1959 in Norwegian music.

== Events ==
=== February ===
- 16 – The Norwegian National Opera and Ballet holds its first performance in Folketeatret in Oslo.

=== May ===
- 29 – The 7th Bergen International Festival started in Bergen, Norway (29 May – 14 June).

== Deaths ==
June

- 3 – Ole Windingstad, orchestra conductor, pianist and composer (born 1886).
- 21 – Fridtjof Backer-Grøndahl, pianist, composer and music teacher (born 1885).

== Births ==
January

- 7 – Jon Larsen, guitarist, composer, surrealistic painter, author, scientific researcher, and record producer.
- 24 – Nils Mathisen, jazz keyboardist, multi-instrumentalist, and composer

February

- 27 – Geir Botnen, classical pianist.

March

- 3 – Frode Alnæs, jazz guitarist and composer, Dance with a Stranger and Masqualero.
- 15
  - Eivind Rølles, singer and guitarist, The Monroes (died 2013).
  - Mattis Hætta, Sami singer and recording artist (died 2022).
- 25 – Per Hillestad, drummer and record producer, Lava.
- 30 – Nils Jansen, jazz saxophonist and clarinetist.

April

- 5 – Elin Rosseland, jazz singer, bandleader, and composer.
- 27 – Odd Magne Gridseth, jazz bassist.

June

- 19 – Diesel Dahl, drummer, TNT.

July

- 28 – Bjørn Ole Rasch, keyboardist, composer, music arranger and producer.

August

- 6 – Sigurd Køhn jazz saxophonist, composer, and band leader (died 2004).
- 20 – Gaute Storaas, jazz bassist and composer.
- 27 – Frode Fjellheim, yoiker and keyboardist, Transjoik.

September

- 14 – Morten Harket, singer, A-ha.
- 30 – Hilde Heltberg, singer, guitarist and songwriter (died 2011).

October

- 20 – Ole Hamre, jazz drummer, percussionist, and composer.
- 24 – Per Eirik Johansen, rock singer and music manager (died 2014)

November

- 30 – Lars Anders Tomter, classical viola player.

December

- 29 – Jørn Christensen, artist, actor, and record producer.
- 30 – Kåre Thomsen, jazz guitarist and graphic designer.

Unknown date

- Bjørn Jenssen, jazz drummer, Dance with a Stranger.

== See also ==
- 1959 in Norway
- Music of Norway
