= Tahiti Drink =

Carton of the cocktail

Tahiti Drink is an alcoholic mixed-drink cocktail that has been made by Manutea Tahiti S.A. since 1984. It is manufactured on the island of Moorea and is sold in distinctively colored cartons. The drink, used as both a cocktail and a mixer, is a combination of pineapple, passion fruit and orange juices, to which vanilla and cane spirit are added.

Manutea Tahiti is owned by Jus de Fruits de Moorea S.A., the largest juice and exotic fruit liquor manufacturer in the South Pacific.
