= String Quartet in E-flat major (Sibelius) =

String quartet by Jean Sibelius (1885)

String Quartet in E♭ major
- by Jean Sibelius
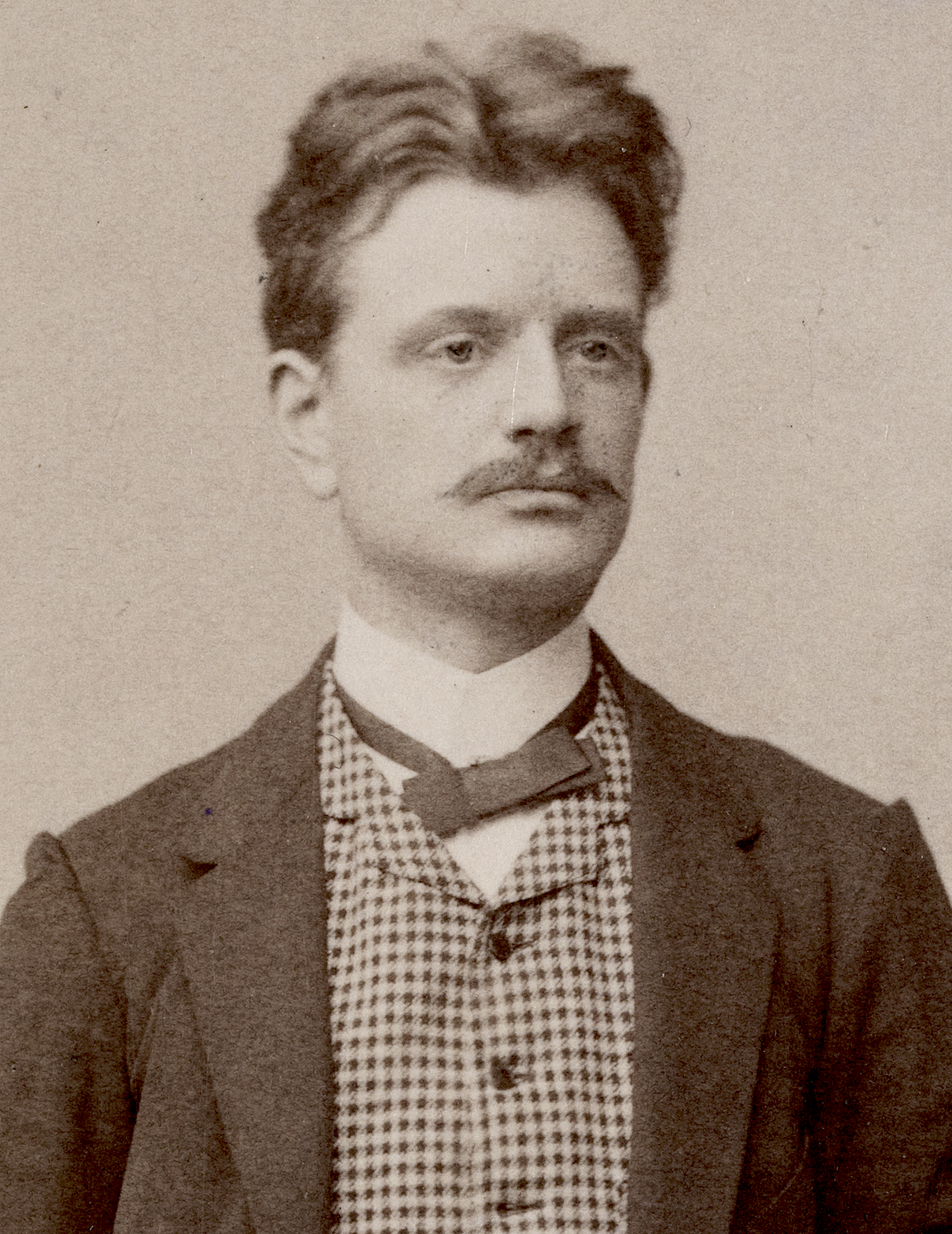
- The composer (c. 1885–1888)
- Catalogue: JS 184
- Composed: 1885
- Publisher: Fazer (1991)
- Duration: 19 mins.
- Movements: Four

The String Quartet in E♭ major, JS 184, is a four-movement chamber piece for two violins, viola, and cello written in June 1885 by the Finnish composer Jean Sibelius. It is the first of Sibelius's four string quartets. The quartet appears in the same sketchbook as two other brief pieces for string quartet: first, the Molto moderato – Scherzo (JS 134), which is Sibelius's earliest piece in the genre; and second, a fragmentary [Scherzo] in B minor (without catalogue marking; completed by Kalevi Aho).

== Structure ==
The quartet is in four movements:

1. Allegro
2. Andante molto
3. Scherzo. Allegretto
4. Vivace

The piece was published posthumously in 1991 by Fazer Music.

== Discography ==
The Sibelius Academy Quartet made the world premiere studio recording of the E♭ major quartet for Finlandia in 1988. The table below lists this and other commercially available recordings:

No.	Quartet	Violin I	Violin II	Viola	Cello	Runtime (Note: All runtimes are official, as printed on CD or LP liner notes.)	Rec. (Note: Refers to the year in which the performers recorded the work; this may not be the same as the year in which the recording was first released to the general public.)	Recording venue	Label	Ref.
1	Sibelius Academy	Seppo Tukiainen	Erkki Kantola	Veikko Kosonen	Arto Noras	18:48	1988	Järvenpää Hall	Finlandia	(Note: Sibelius Academy–Finlandia (4509–95851–2) 1992)
2	Tempera	Laura Vikman	Silva Koskela	Tiila Kangas	Ulla Lampela	17:41	2004	Länna Church, Uppland	BIS	(Note: Tempera–BIS (CD–1376) 2005)

== Notes, references, and sources ==
Notes

Sources

- Barnett, Andrew (2007). Sibelius. New Haven: Yale University Press. ISBN 978-0-300-11159-0.
- Dahlström, Fabian [in Swedish] (2003). Jean Sibelius: Thematisch-bibliographisches Verzeichnis seiner Werke [Jean Sibelius: A Thematic Bibliographic Index of His Works] (in German). Wiesbaden: Breitkopf & Härtel. ISBN 3-7651-0333-0.
