= Kungens lilla piga =

Song
- Language: Swedish
- Genre: children
- Songwriter: Anna-Lisa Frykman

Kungens lilla piga is a children's song written by Anna-Lisa Frykman, describing a working day for a young housemaid girl working at the royal court.

The 1943 "Nu ska vi sjunga" Elsa Beskow illustration shows a little girl acting as the housemaid. Later, the song has been criticized for glorifying child labour.

== Publications ==
- Nu ska vi sjunga, 1943, under rubriken "Lekvisor"

== Recordings ==
An early recording was done by Nadja Hjärne-Ohrberg with Stig Holm's ensemble on 28 September 1945, and the record came out in December the same year.
