= Carl Leopold Sjöberg =

Swedish composer

Carl Leopold Sjöberg (28 May 1861 – 26 January 1900) was a Swedish composer. His song "Tonerna" ("Visions"), composed around 1892, was a staple of the famous tenor Jussi Björling and still appears in the concert repertory.
