= Gud, som haver barnen kär =

Swedish prayer for children

"Gud, som haver barnen kär..." (Swedish for 'God, who holds the children dear') is an old prayer for children, of unknown origin. The prayer was first printed in 1780 in Barnabok, hans Kongl. höghet kronprinsen i underdånighet tilägnad af Samfundet Pro fide et Christianismo ('Children's book, humbly dedicated to his Royal Highness the Crown Prince by the Pro fide et Christianismo Society'), which was published on the occasion of the Swedish crown prince's (later Gustav IV Adolf) second birthday. In the book the prayer is called "En allmän bön för små barn" ('A general prayer for little children') and reads as follows:

Gud som haver barnen kär
Se till mig som liten är
Vart jag mig i världen vänder
Står min lycka i Guds händer
Lyckan kommer lyckan går
Du förbliver fader vår
Den Gud älskar lyckan får
Amen.

Translation:

God who holds the children dear,
Look after me, who is so little
Wherever in the world I may wander
My happiness stands in god's hands
Happiness comes happiness goes
Thou remainest our Father.
Who god loves shall receive happiness
Amen.

It is likely based on an orally transmitted prayer. It was first printed as a hymn in the Salvation Army songbook of 1907. It was later published in the Swedish Sunday School hymnal (1908) where three additional verses were composted by Johan Bernhard Gauffin and Carl Boberg and eventually in the regular hymnal Nya psalmer 1921, the annex to the 1819 Swedish hymnal where Siri Dahlquist extended the prayer by five additional verses, of which the first one begins "Gode Fader, i din vård" ('Good father, in thy care'). Another version, among Swedish-Americans in the 20th century, has as the third and fourth lines (and conclusion) the verse: 'Vart jag viker ellor vänder /Bar du mig i dina händer' - roughly translated, 'wherever I may wander, hold me in your hand.'

The melody, according to Koralbok för Nya psalmer, 1921 was possibly composed in 1531, but in later editions the melody is attributed to Ivar Widéen in 1912. The prayer is also sometimes sung with the same melody as "Twinkle, twinkle, little star". The first printed version of the prayer was sung to the melody "Härlig är Guds himmel blå".

== Sources ==
- Lövgren, Oscar (1964). Psalm och Sånglexikon (in Swedish).
