= Mors lilla Olle =

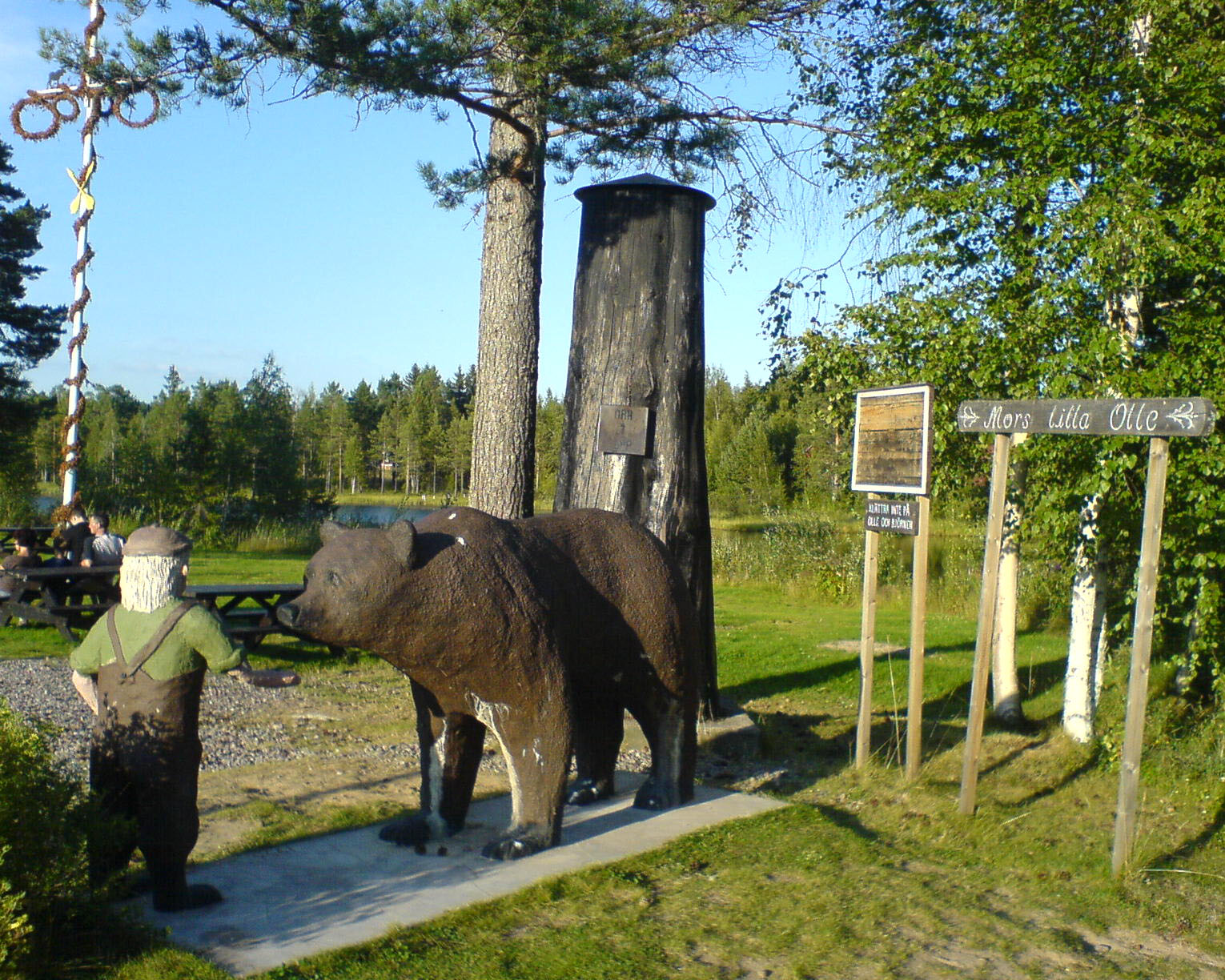
A wooden sculpture outside Särna, Sweden depicting the song's meeting between Olle and the bear.

"Mors lilla Olle" ("Mother's little Olle") is a Swedish children's song by Alice Tegnér. The song is about the boy Olle, who meets a bear in the forest. He is not frightened, believing the bear to be a dog, and feeds the bear all of his precious blueberries. When Olle's mother sees him and the bear she screams loudly, and the bear flees. Olle then asks his mother if the "dog" couldn't come back again.

In the song, Olle is approximately 4–5 years of age, and therefore does not understand what a bear is. The lyrics was inspired by an actual event. In September 1850, a toddler named Jon Ersson and his older siblings picked lingonberries a couple of hundred meters from their home in Morbäcksätern outside the village Särna in Dalarna. Jon, at that time just one year and seven months old, met a female brown bear with two cubs and fed the cubs lingonberry twigs. They got tired and the cubs and Jon all lay to rest next to the female bear. Jon's eldest sister then fetched their mother and she scared off the bears. A Norwegian newspaper wrote an article about this incident in April 1851 and the author Wilhelm von Braun (1813–1860) wrote a poem about it, Stark i sin oskuld ("Strong in his innocence") which starts with the line "Small boy in a mountain forest went, rosy cheeks and angelic look...".

Alice Tegner was inspired by the poem and as a consequence wrote "Mors lilla Olle". It was published in volume 3 of Tegner's Sjung med oss, mamma! ("Sing with us, mom!") in 1895.

"Mors lilla Olle" has also been recorded in a reggae version by Swedish Peps Persson in 1978.
