= Joseph Vidal (composer) =

French composer

Joseph Bernard Vidal (15 November 1859 – 18 December 1924) was a French composer, born in Toulouse. Among his works are two operas Le Mariage d'Yvette (1896) and Le Chevalier de Fontenoy. He died in Paris.
