= An Imaginary Trip to the Faroe Islands =

Carl Nielsen's orchestra music composition

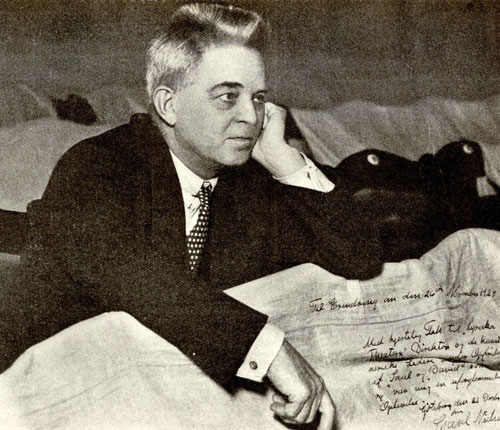
Carl Nielsen in 1928

Carl Nielsen's rhapsody overture An Imaginary Trip to the Faroe Islands (En Fantasirejse til Færøerne) is a musical composition for orchestra. The Royal Danish Theatre in Copenhagen commissioned the piece for a gala concert celebrating a visit from the Faroe Islands. The composer conducted the premiere on 27 November 1927.

== Background ==
In a letter to his wife dated 4 January 1927, Nielsen wrote: "Now over the next 8-10 days I have to write an overture to mark a big Faroese gala at the Royal Theatre supported by the State... I will use motifs from the Faroese ballads, and I can easily manage that, and it will give me some pleasure as it is good that we do something for them." In fact the visit was postponed until November owing to an influenza epidemic.

There were only two performances of the work during Nielsen's lifetime, both of them in connection with the Faroese celebrations. The first was at the Royal Theatre on 27 November 1927, the second at a concert in Copenhagen City Hall with the Copenhagen Philharmonic Orchestra.

== Music ==
A couple of days before the gala performance on 27 November 1927, a long interview with Nielsen was published in Politiken where the composer had the opportunity to comment on his music.

After all, it’s just an occasional work, an example of workmanship if you like... but I have personally been happy working with it and I think it has come to sound very good. I have used many of the Faroese melodies in it, but the introduction and ending are free composition." He then goes on to describe the voyage: "I begin by describing the sea, as you feel it during the crossing – the monotonous mighty sea. It is quiet, but I think that it is precisely when the sea is calm that you most strongly sense its terrible depth... its depth and endlessness at the same time. During the voyage, we suddenly hear a bird cry that makes us think that we are near land. Of course, generally speaking, I am no great lover of programme music, but this time I think that the occasion called for a programme for the journey... some people on board now seem to see land, they get enthusiastic, a fanfare tells you, but the mist obscures the view, and it quietens down again. Then new bird cries rise up, and the land looms ahead. The music grows in volume and seriousness and breaks into a Faroese melody; on the shore many people are waiting to welcome us, and we hear them shouting and stamping. With no explanatory transition, I now place the traveller in the midst of a feast, with singing and dancing. I depict this feast in powerful music, where the ballad motifs play a role – and the depiction of the feast is interrupted by a Faroese folk tune. It calms down the music for a moment, creates a mood of gentleness amidst the dancing. But again, the feast livens up to dancing and merriment, until the end – then it all subsides in one long note, a very low clarinet note that quietly fades away...

When asked how he became acquainted with Faroese tunes, Nielsen explained:

They have interested me for many years. I knew Hjalmar Thuren, who collected many of them out there, getting people to sing them for him, and I have studied Dr. Grüner-Nielsen's large collection. Many of the songs are very beautiful, and they have a wealth of songs on the Faroe Islands. They are often closely related to the Danish ones, but with small variations – just as there are variants of the old texts that Svend Grundtvig collected. But some of the melodies also have their own tone. It’s borne up by a certain quiet seriousness. It reminds me of people who go around quietly and yet have a strong effect on others because behind the calm you sense solid substance. You can’t call Faroese song melancholy – rather, it gives the impression of a mind that is resigned to the will of Fate. It is these melodies that I have had as material... they have set the tone for my overture. I did not create so much of it myself through any spiritual experience, and yet the work has filled me with pleasure. I have tried to offer some of the same spirit that the painter or sculptor creates when he places his abilities at the service of applied art.

The programme for the concert listed the following subtitles for the work:

- The Calm Sea
- The Land on Arrival
- Dancing and Singing
- Farewell
- Calm at Sea

A typical performance lasts a little over ten minutes.
