= Oskar Lindberg (composer) =

Swedish composer, church musician and teacher (1887–1955)

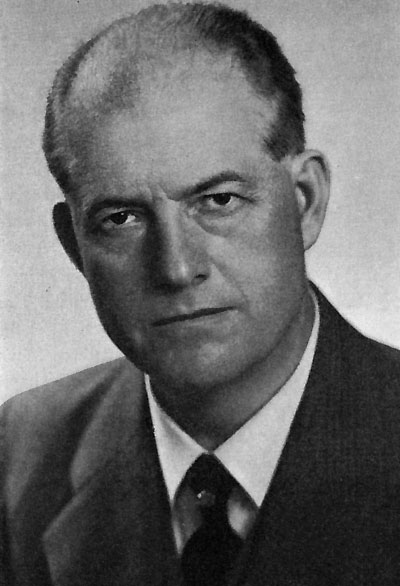
- Lindberg, c. 1945
- Born: Oskar Fredrik Lindberg; 23 February 1887; Gagnef, Dalarna, Sweden
- Died: 10 April 1955 (aged 68); Stockholm, Sweden
- Education: Royal Swedish Academy of Music
- Occupations: Composer; church musician; teacher; professor
- Employer: Royal Swedish Academy of Music
- Style: Classical
- Relatives: Nils Lindberg (nephew)
- Musical career
- Instrument: Organ

Oskar Fredrik Lindberg (23 February 1887 – 10 April 1955) was a Swedish composer, church musician, teacher and professor. In 1939 he edited the Church of Sweden's hymnbook. His 1912 Requiem was of particular importance to the history of Swedish liturgical works.

== Biography ==
Lindberg was born in Gagnef, Dalarna, Sweden in 1887. At age 14, he was already playing the organ at mass in his home town. From 1903 to 1911, he studied at the Royal Swedish Academy of Music, where he graduated as an organist in 1906. At the same time, he studied composition with Ernst Ellberg and Andreas Hallén, supplementing this with studies in conducting at the academy in Sondershausen, with further specialization in Germany and Austria.

From 1906 to 1914, he worked as organist at the Holy Trinity Church in Stockholm and, from 1914 to 1955, at Engelbrekt Church. He taught harmony at the Royal Academy of Music from 1919 to 1952 and was appointed professor there in 1936. He was a member of the Royal Swedish Academy of Music from 1926 until his death.

Lindberg participated in the production of the 1939 hymn book. He also wrote many non-religious works, including a symphony and symphonic poems. At a meeting in the Gagnef mission house, he heard a song that stuck in his mind, a folk melody from the village of Älvdalen. For a radio broadcast in 1936, he wrote an arrangement for organ, and this "Gammal fäbodpsalm från Dalarna" is probably his most widely performed work. (The same melody is interpreted by Merit Hemmingsson on her 2021 album Huvva vad tiden går. She attributes it to Bälter Erik Olsson, Älvdalen.)

Lindberg died in Stockholm in 1955. He was the uncle of the jazz musician and composer Nils Lindberg.

== Style ==
Lindberg wrote in a tonal idiom which blended features of composers such as Rachmaninoff and Sibelius with folk music and impressionistic elements.
