= Wilhelm Harteveld =

Swedish composer and musicologist (1859–1927)

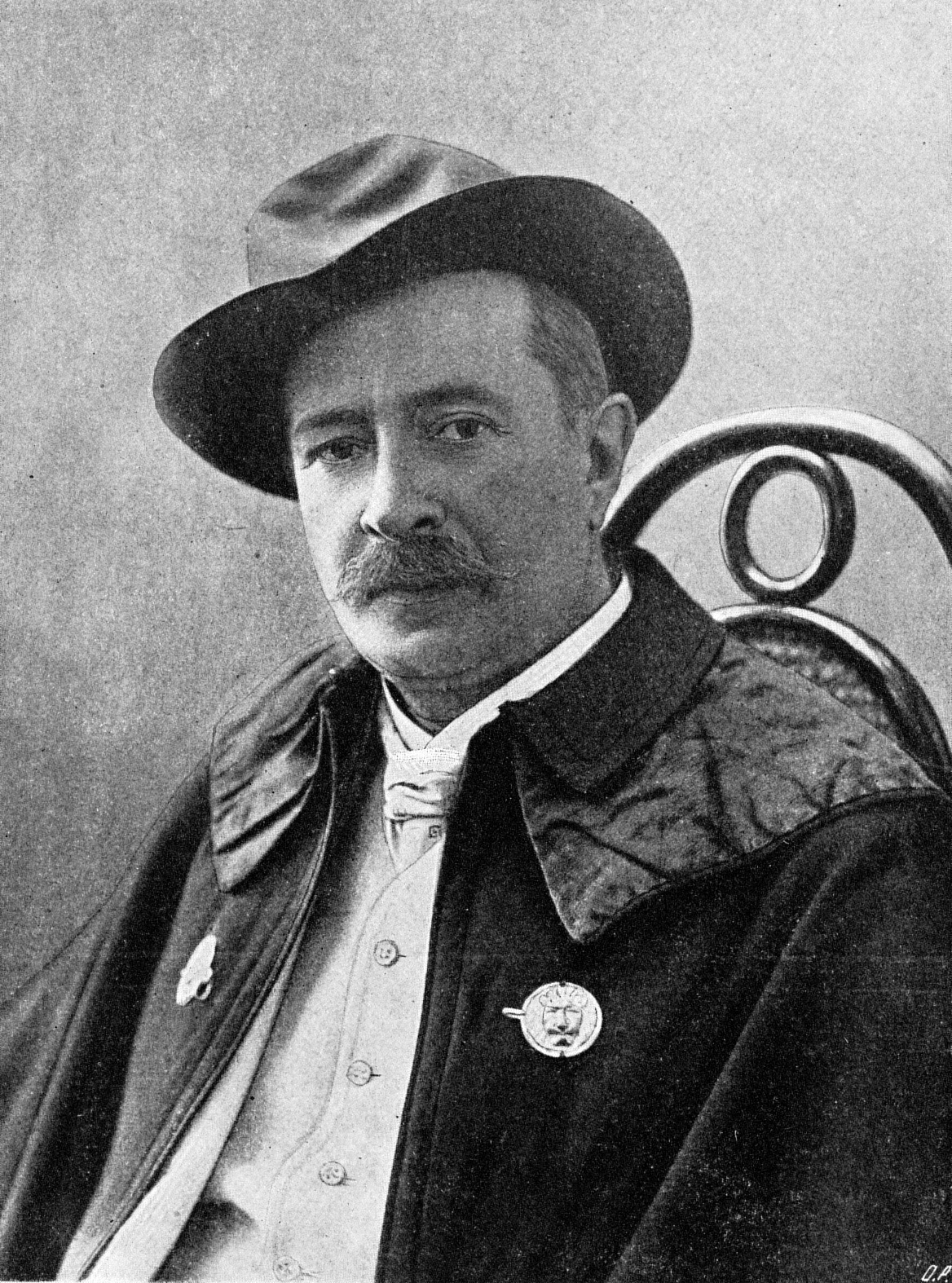
Wilhelm Harteveld

Julius Napoleon Wilhelm Harteveld (5 April 1859 – 1 October 1927) was a Swedish composer and musicologist. He was born and died in Stockholm.

He lived in Russia for over 35 years, working as a teacher and conductor. During his time there, he collected Siberian folk songs and founded Kiev’s music society.

His works include Kärlekens triumfsång (based on Ivan Turgenev’s novel) ,Kiev and Rymlingen: lösdrivarnas sånger som musikaliskt rollspel; he also wrote a travelogue, Svart och rött. Sorglustiga historier från det gamla och nya Ryssland.

== Family ==
Harteveld had three children while in Russia; he later married Anna Peder and they had a daughter named Magda.
