= Alice Tegnér =

Swedish music teacher, poet and composer (1864–1943)

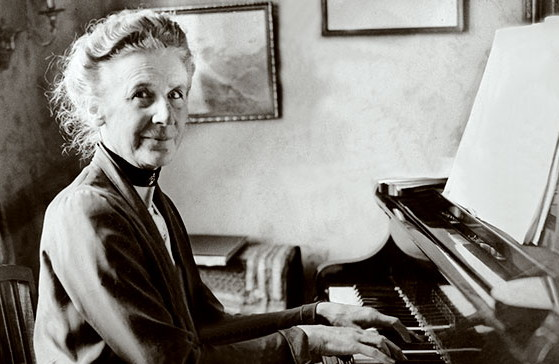

Background information
- Born: Alice Charlotta Sandström; 12 March 1864; Karlshamn, Sweden
- Died: 26 May 1943 (aged 79) Djursholm, Sweden
- Genres: Children's songs Hymn
- Occupations: Composer; Music teacher Organist
- Years active: 19th-20th centuries
- Spouse: Jakob Tegnér (m. 1885)

Alice Charlotta Tegnér (Swedish: [aˈliːs tɛŋˈneːr]; née Sandström; 12 March 1864 – 26 May 1943) was a Swedish music teacher, poet and composer. She is the foremost composer of Swedish children's songs during the late 19th century and the first half of the 20th century.

== Background ==
Alice Charlotta Sandström was born in Karlshamn, Sweden, the daughter of Eduard Sandström (1829–1879), a ship's captain. The family moved to Stockholm in 1877 and Alice attended Åhlinska skolan. From 1880 to 1883 Sandström attended the Royal Seminary (Högre lärarinneseminariet) in Stockholm to train as a teacher. After graduation, she worked as governess. Her first position, in Finland, lasted a year. Her second position was with the publisher Frans Beijer in Stockholm.

In 1885, she married Jakob Tegnér (1851–1926), a lawyer, and later secretary of the Swedish Publishers' Association and editor of Svenska Bokhandelstidningen. The couple moved to the new suburb of Djursholm in 1891. Alice Tegnér worked voluntarily as a teacher at Djursholms samskola and with the choir in the Djursholm chapel where Natanael Beskow was a preacher.

== Career ==
Alice Tegnér wrote many well-known children's songs in Swedish, most notably Mors lilla Olle. It was published during 1895 in volume 3 of Sjung med oss, mamma!

Tegnér also worked in such classical genres as chamber and sacred music together with choral music, cantatas, cello and violin sonatas. Her songs and compositions were inspired by both folk and art music. Her well-known hymnbook Nu ska vi sjunga, with illustrations by Elsa Beskow, was published in 1943.

== Awards ==
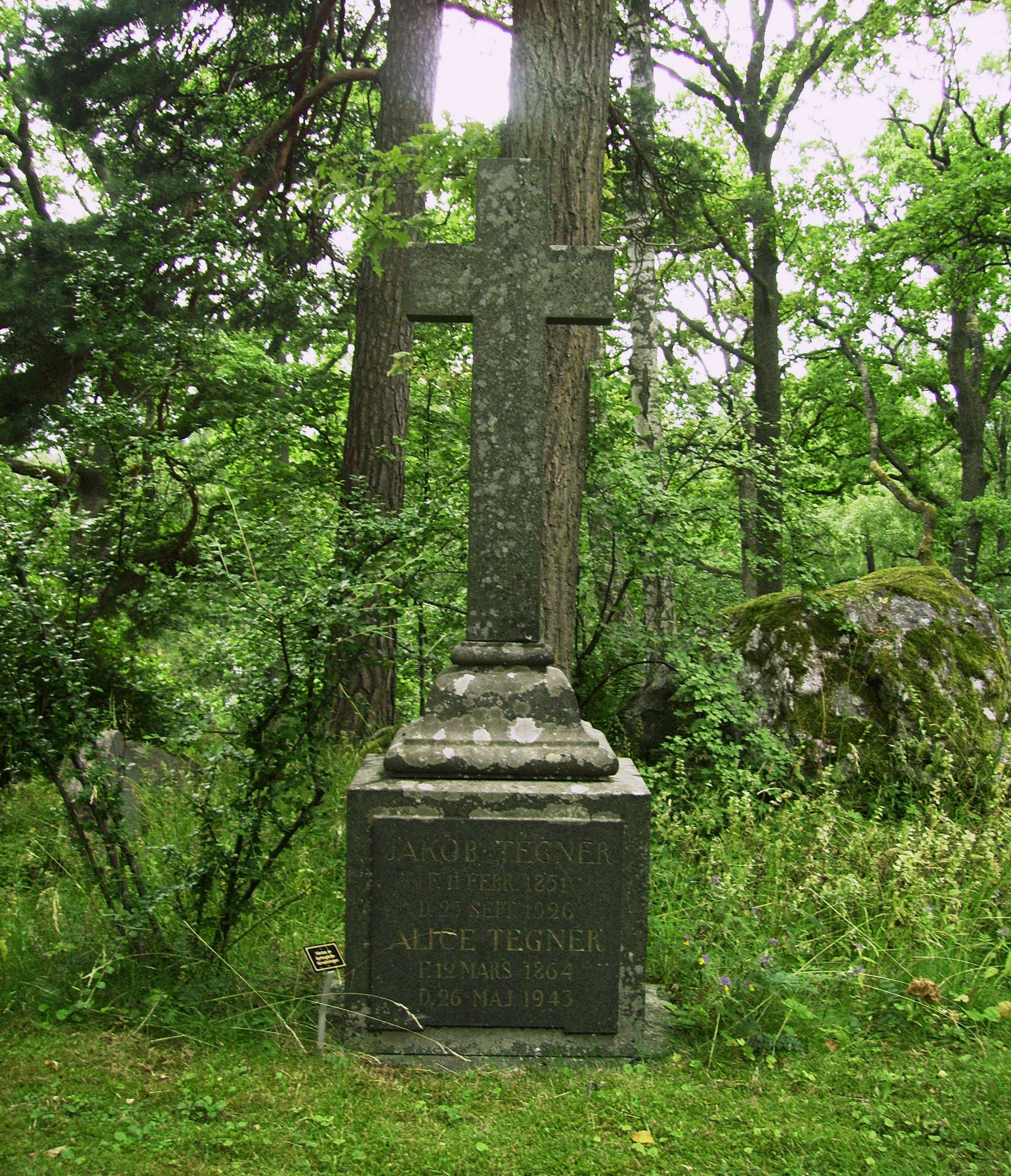
Alice Tegnér's grave, Djursholm burial ground

- 1914 Litteris et Artibus
- 1926 member of the Swedish Royal Academy of Music (Kungliga Musikaliska akademien)
- 1929 First prize in the magazine Idun tonsättartävling

== Selected works ==
=== Children's songs ===
- Asarumsdalen
- Baka kaka
- Borgmästar Munthe
- Bä, bä, vita lamm
- Dansa min docka
- Ekorrn satt i granen
- Hemåt i regnväder (text: Zacharias Topelius)
- I skogen
- Julbocken
- Kring julgranen
- Lasse liten (text: Zacharias Topelius)
- Marschlek
- Skogsblommorna till barnen (text: Elsa Beskow)
- Sockerbagare

=== Other songs ===
- Var är den Vän, som överallt jag söker (text: Johan Olof Wallin)
- Betlehems stjärna (Gläns över sjö och strand) (text: Viktor Rydberg)
- Hell, vårt land!

=== Other works ===
- Violin Sonata in A Minor
