= Barnens svenska sångbok =

1999 Swedish song book by Anders Palm and Johan Stenström

- Language: Swedish
- Genre: Songbook
- Publication date: 1999
- Publication place: Sweden

Barnens svenska sångbok ("Children's Swedish Song book") is a 1999 Swedish song book by Anders Palm and Johan Stenström. It follows the 1997 song book Den svenska sångboken and is followed by the 2009 song book Evert Taube – Sångboken.

The books include songs for children from the 17th and 18th centuries as well as more contemporary works and the songs are meant to be sung at home, at kindergarten and/or at school.

== Contents ==
=== Sånger för småfolk ("Songs For Children (little people)") ===
- 1.Det gåtfulla folket ("The Puzzling People")
- 2.Mors lilla Olle ("Mother's Little Olle")
- 3.Tula hem och tula vall
- 4.Vart ska du gå, min lilla flicka? ("Where are you going, my little girl?")
- 5.Tummeliten
- 6.Sockerbagaren ("The Pastry chef")
- 7.Blinka lilla stjärna
- 8.Lilla Ludde
- 9.Vem kan segla förutan vind? ("Who Can Sail Without the Wind?")
- 10.Lunka på ("Plod on")
- 11.Tycker du om mig ("Do You Like Me")
- 12.Alfabetsvisan ("The Alphabet Song")
- 13.Herr Gurka ("Mr Cucumber")
- 14.Krakel Spektakel
- 15.Dinkeli dunkeli doja
- 16.Vattenvisan ("The Water Song")
- 17.Hej, sa Petronella ("Hi, said Petronella")
- 18.Önskevisa ("Wish song")
- 19.Markisen av Carabas ("The Marquis of Carabas")
- 20.Annabell Olsson
- 21.Tom-balalajka
- 22.Vaggvisa för en liten grön banan ("Lullaby For a Little Green Banana")
- 23.Här kommer Pippi Långstrump ("Here comes Pippi Longstocking")
- 24.Mors lilla lathund ("Mother's Little Lazybones")
- 25.Du käre lille Snickerbo ("You Dear Little Carpenter House")
- 26.Fattig bonddräng ("Poor Farmworker")
- 27.Piluttavisan
- 28.Luffarvisan ("The Hobo Song")
- 29.Vargsången ("The Wolf Song")
- 30.Falukorvsvisan ("The Falukorv Song") (falukorv is a kind of sausage)
- 31.Alla ska sova för nu är det natt ("Everyone Should Sleep Because Now It's Night")
- 32.Røvervise (by Thorbjørn Egner) (Swedish-language version)
- 33.Gubben i lådan ("The Jack in the Box")
- 34.Sudda sudda ("Erase Erase") (by Gullan Bornemark)
- 35.Lillebror ("Little Brother") (by Gullan Bornemark)
- 36.Gunga åt öster ("Swing East")
- 37.Blommig falukorv ("Floral Falukorv") (by Hans Alfredson)
- 38.Galen i glass ("Crazy about Ice-cream")
- 39.Det brinner, det brinner ("It burns, it burns")
- 40.Jag vill ha munkar ("I Want Doughnuts")
- 41.Rimtramsa ("Rhyme Silly")

=== Året runt ("All Year Round") ===
- 1.Årstiderna ("The Seasons")
- 2.Månaderna ("The Months")
- 3.Vintern rasat ut
- 4.Ägg ("Egg")
- 5.Vår på Saltkråkan ("Spring at Saltkråkan")
- 6.Sommarlov ("Summer Holiday")
- 7.Sommarlov, solen lyser skönt ("Summer holiday, the Sun Lights Beautifully")
- 8.Idas sommarvisa ("Ida's Summer song")
- 9.Sommarsången ("Summer Song")
- 10.Här är den sköna sommar ("Here's the Beautiful Summer") (by Evert Taube)
- 11.Brevet från Lillan ("The Letter From Lillan") (by Evert Taube)
- 12.Sjösala vals ("Waltz of Sjösala") (by Evert Taube)
- 13.Överbyvals ("Waltz of Överby")
- 14.Barfotavisan ("Barefoot Song")
- 15.Jag tror på sommaren ("I Believe in the Summer")
- 16.Ute blåser sommarvind ("Outside the Summer Wind's Blowing")
- 17.Den blomstertid nu kommer ("Now the Time of blossoming Arrives")
- 18.I denna ljuva sommartid
- 19.Gubben Höst ("The old man Autumn")
- 20.Vem tar hand om hösten ("Who Takes Care of the Autumn")
- 21.Nej se det snöar ("No See It Snows")
- 22.Adventstid ("Advent Time")
- 23.Lusse lelle
- 24.Lucia
- 25–27. Saint Lucia-songs
- 28.Nu vaknen och glädjens
- 29–31.Saint Stephen-songs
- 32.Goder afton, goder afton (Julafton) ("Good evening, good evening (Christmas Eve)")
- 33.Jullov ("Christmas holiday")
- 34.Raska fötter springa tripp, tripp, tripp
- 35.Julpolska
- 36.Kring julgranen ("Around the Christmas tree")
- 37.Tomtarnas julnatt ("The Tomtes' Christmas night")
- 38.Tre pepparkaksgubbar ("Three Gingerbread men")
- 39.Musevisa (Swedish-language version)
- 40.Hej tomtegubbar ("Hi Tomte Men")
- 41.Ett barn är fött på denna dag ("A Child's Born On This Day")
- 42.Vaggsång till Jesus ("Lullaby to Jesus")
- 43.När det lider mot jul ("When It draws towards Christmas")
- 44.Stilla natt ("Silent Night")
- 45.Bereden väg för Herran ("Prepare a Way For the Lord")
- 46.Hosianna, Davids son ("Hosanna, Son of David")
- 47.Nu tändas tusen juleljus ("Now Thousand Christmas lights are Lit")
- 48.Var hälsad, sköna morgonstund ("Hail, Blessed Morning")
- 49.När juldagsmorgon glimmar ("When Christmas day morning Glimmers")
- 50.Gläns över sjö och strand ("Shine over Lake and Beach")

=== Djur och natur ("Animal and Nature") ===
- 1.Blåsippor ("Hepaticas")
- 2.Videvisan ("Willow Song")
- 3.Ask ("Ash")
- 4.Blåklint ("Cornflower")
- 5.Ek ("Oak")
- 6.Humle ("Common hop")
- 7.Rönn ("Sorbus aucuparia")
- 8.Har du sett herr Kantarell ("Have You Seen Mr Chanterelle")
- 9.Plocka svamp ("Picking Mushrooms")
- 10.Alla fåglar kommit ren ("All the Birds have already arrived")
- 11.Gåsa, gåsa klinga
- 12.Bä, bä, vita lamm (Baa, baa, white lamb)
- 13.Ekorr'n satt i granen ("The Squirrel Sat in the Spruce")
- 14.Lilla snigel ("Little Slug")
- 15.Vem krafsade på dörren? ("Who Straches on the Door")
- 16.Tänk om jag hade en liten, liten apa ("Imagine If I Had a Little, Little Monkey")
- 17.Jonte Myra ("Jonte the Ant")
- 18.Balladen om den kaxiga myran ("The Ballad About the Cocky Ant")
- 19.Ville Valross ("Ville the Walrus")
- 20.Jag är en liten undulat ("I'm a Little Budgerigar")
- 21.Klättermusvisan ("The Song about the Climbing Mouse")
- 22.Pepparkakebagarns visa ("The Song about the Gingerbread Baker")
- 23.Visan om Bamsefars födelsedag
- 24.Teddybjörnen Fredriksson ("Fredriksson, the Teddy Bear")
- 25.Bamses signaturmelodi ("Bamse's Theme")
- 26.Okända djur ("Unknown Animals")

=== Sång med lek och dans ("Songs With Play and Dance") ===
- 1.Björnen sover ("The Bear Sleeps")
- 2.Fem fina fåglar ("Five Nice Birds")
- 3.Kaninvisan ("The Rabbit Song")
- 4.Vipp-på-rumpan-affärn
- 5.Huvud, axlar, knän och tår ("Head, Shoulders, Knees and Toes")
- 6.Imse vimse spindel
- 7.Rockspindeln ("The Rock Spider")
- 8.En elefant balanserade ("An Elephant balanced")
- 9.Klappa händerna ("Clap Your Hands")
- 10.Tomten och haren ("The Tomte and The Hare")
- 11.En kulen natt ("A Chilly Night")
- 12.Tigerjakten ("The Tiger Hunt")
- 13.Bockarna Bruse ("The Billy Goats Gruff")
- 14.Moster Ingeborg ("Aunt Ingeborg")
- 15.Min gamle kompis Kalle Svensson ("My Old Friend Kalle Svensson")
- 16.Wodeli Atcha
- 17.Sabukuaja
- 18.Jag skakar på händerna ("I shake My Hands")
- 19.Fader Abraham ("Father Abraham")
- 20.Hånki tånki
- 21.När vi gick på stan ("When We Walked in the Town")
- 22.Små grodorna ("Little Frogs")
- 23.Tre små gummor ("Three Little Old Women")
- 24.Törnrosa ("Sleeping Beauty")
- 25.Bro bro breja
- 26.Känner du Lotta, min vän ("Do you know Lotta, my friend")
- 27.Så gå vi runt om ett enerissnår ("Here We Go Round the Mulberry Bush")
- 28.Vi äro musikanter ("We Are Musicians")
- 29.Viljen I veta och viljen I förstå ("Do You Want to Know and Do You Want to Understand")
- 30.Flickorna de små ("The Little Girls")
- 31.Skära, skära havre ("Cutting, cutting corn")
- 32.Vi ska ställa till en roliger dans ("We Will Start a Joyful Dance")
- 33.Morsgrisar
- 34.Och flickan hon går i dansen ("And the Girl Goes Dancing")
- 35.Ritsch, ratsch, filibom
- 36.Räven raskar över isen ("The Fox Hurries over the Ice")
- 37.Sju vackra flickor ("Seven Pretty Girls")
- 38.Karusellen ("The Carousel")

=== Hemma i världen ("Home in the World") ===
- 1.Mitt eget land ("My Own Country")
- 2.Broder Jakob ("Brother John")
- 3.Lincolnvisan ("The Lincoln Song")
- 4.I en sal på lasarettet ("In a Room at the Hospital")
- 5.Möte i monsunen ("Rendezvous in the Monsoon") (by Evert Taube)
- 6.Oxdragarsång ("Pulling-oxen-song")
- 7.Pepita dansar ("Pepita Dances")
- 8.Änglamark ("Angelic Land") (by Evert Taube)
- 9.I natt jag drömde ("Last Night I Had the Strangest Dream")
- 10.Jag hade en gång en båt ("I Once had a Boat")
- 11.Brev från kolonien ("Letter from the Summer Camp")
- 12.Turistens klagan ("The Tourist's Complaining")
- 13.Hej hå ("Hi Ho")
- 14.En tokig sång ("A Clumsy Song")
- 15.Bibbidi bobbidi boo
- 16.Apans sång ("I Wan'na Be Like You (The Monkey Song)")
- 17.Alla snubbar vill ju va katt ("Everybody Wants to Be a Cat")
- 18.O-de-lally
- 19.Du och jag ("You and Me")
- 20.Du är min bästa kompis ("You're My Best Friend")
- 21.Bangzulusång
- 22.Sträck ut din hand ("Stretch Out Your Hand")
- 23.David och Goljat
- 24.Titta vad jag fann ("See What I Found")
- 25.Vi sätter oss i ringen ("We Sit in the Ring")
- 26.Tryggare kan ingen vara
- 27.Du gamla, du fria (The Swedish National Anthem)

=== Gladsång och poplåt ("Lucky songs and pop songs") ===
- 1.Josefin mä symaskin ("Josephine with Sewing machine")
- 2.Spel-Olles gånglåt
- 3.Sill i dill ("Herring in Dill")
- 4.I Medelhavet ("In the Mediterranean sea")
- 5.Hemma på vår gård ("Home at our Farm")
- 6.Spöket Huckehajen ("Huckehajen the Ghost")
- 7.Tidigt varje morgon ("Early Every Morning")
- 8.Mellanmål ("Snack")
- 9.Klara, färdiga, gå ("Ready, Steady, Go")
- 10.Äppelmelodin ("The Apple Melody")
- 11.Vi cyklar runt i världen ("We Ride Bicycle Around in the World")
- 12.Yllevisan ("The Woolen Song")
- 13.Macken ("The Filling Station")
- 14.En rullande pantarmaskin
- 15.Änglahund ("Angel Dog")
- 16.Ooa hela natten
- 17.Trettifyran ("The 34")
- 18.Jag vill ha en egen måne ("I Want a Moon of My Own")
- 19.Sol, vind och vatten ("Sun, Wind and Water")
- 20.Främling ("Stranger")
- 21.Sommaren är kort ("Summer's Short")
- 22.Pom pom
- 23.Kung av sand ("King of Sand")
- 24.Sommartider ("Summer Times")
- 25.Gå och fiska! ("Go Fishing")
- 26.Banankontakt ("Banana Connector")
- 27.Min Piraya Maja ("My Piranha Maja")
- 28.Zvampen ("'The Mushroom'")
- 29.Ett rött litet hjärta ("A Red Little Heart")
