= Vaggsång till Jesus =

1971 Swedish Christmas song

"Vaggssång till Jesus"
- Hymn
- Text: by Britt G. Hallqvist
- Language: Swedish
- Melody: by Bertil Hallin
- Published: 1971

"Vaggssång till Jesus", "Somna nu lilla barn" or "Vaggsång för en liten timmerman" is a 1971 Swedish Christmas song, with lyrics by Britt G. Hallqvist and music by Bertil Hallin. The song was originally published in the 1971 songbook "Det visste inte kejsarn om" at Verbum Förlag AB. The compilation consists of 20 songs talking about people and incidents in the New Testament about the life of Jesus. The songs were recorded by Ulla Neuman, and the record was released in Denmark, Norway and Sweden. The song has also been published in Barnens svenska sångbok (1999), Nya barnpsalmboken (2001) and circa 20 other songbooks.

The song is written as a lullaby that Mary sings for Jesus, as she thinks Jesus will one day become a timberman just like Jesus’ Earthly father Joseph, but meanwhile she thinks of what the angel said according to the Bible, and the gifts from the Three Wise Men.

== Publication ==
- Barnens svenska sångbok, 1999, under the lines "Året runt".

== Recordings ==
An early recording, entitled "Vaggsång", was done by a choir consisting of 10−13-year-olds from the Immanuel Church in Norrköping on the 1976 album Hela jorden sjunger.

Artur Erikson also recorded a version in 2011 under the title Vaggsång - Somna nu lilla barn on the album Ropa ut från bergen

== See also ==
- Christian child's prayer § Lullabies
