= Nu tändas tusen juleljus (Agnetha Fältskog and Linda Ulvaeus album) =

Studio album by Agnetha Fältskog and Linda Ulvaeus
- Released: October 1981
- Recorded: November 1980
- Genre: Christmas music
- Length: 32:48
- Label: Polar Music
- Producer: Agnetha Fältskog; Michael B. Tretow

Agnetha Fältskog and Linda Ulvaeus chronology
Tio år med Agnetha (1979)	Nu tändas tusen juleljus (1981)	Wrap Your Arms Around Me (1983)

Nu tändas tusen juleljus (Now a thousand Christmas candles are lit) is a Christmas album in Swedish, recorded in 1980 by Swedish pop singer and ABBA member Agnetha Fältskog and her daughter Linda Ulvaeus, who was at the time 7 years old.

== Album information ==
The album was co-produced by Fältskog and Michael B. Tretow and recorded in the Polar Studios with the same musicians as on contemporary ABBA recordings. The album was recorded in November 1980 but since it wasn't completed in time for Christmas 1980 it was postponed and not released until nearly a year later, in October 1981. Nu tändas tusen julejus, which was Fältskog's first Swedish language recording for the Polar Music label after having left CBS-Cupol, peaked at No. 6 on the Swedish album chart in January 1982, has been re-released on CD by Polar Music/PolyGram/Universal Music all through the 1990s and 2000s and is one of the best-selling Swedish Christmas albums of all time. The album name is derived from one of Scandinavia's best-known Christmas carols.

== Track listing ==
Side A
No.	Title	Writer(s)	Lead-Vocalist	Length
1.	"Nej se det snöar"	Felix Körling		0:56
2.	"Bjällerklang" (Jingle Bells)	Trad.-arr. Lars O. Carlsson	Agnetha Fältskog	2:34
3.	"Nu tändas tusen juleljus"	Trad.-arr. Lars O. Carlsson	Linda Ulvaeus, Agnetha Fältskog	2:40
4.	"Två små röda luvor"	Trad.-arr. Lars O. Carlsson	Linda Ulvaeus	2:47
5.	"Nu står jul vid snöig port"	Trad.-arr. Lars O. Carlsson	Agnetha Fältskog	2:32
6.	"Jag såg mamma kyssa tomten" (I Saw Mommy Kissing Santa Claus)	Tommie Connor, Ninita	Linda Ulvaeus	2:27
7.	"När juldagsmorgon glimmar"	Trad.-arr. Lars O. Carlsson	Linda Ulvaeus, Agnetha Fältskog	2:32
Total length:				16:32

Side B
No.	Title	Writer(s)	Lead-Vocalist	Length
1.	"Potpurri" a. "Nu har vi ljus här i vårt hus" b. "Tre små pepparkaksgubbar" c. "Räven raskar över isen" d. "Vi äro musikanter" e. "Hej tomtegubbar" f. "Jungfru jungfru kär" g. "Nu är det jul igen""	Trad.-arr. Lars O. Carlsson; Alice Tegnér, Astrid Gullstrand; Trad.-arr. Lars O. Carlsson; Trad.-arr. Lars O. Carlsson; Trad.-arr. Lars O. Carlsson; Trad.-arr. Lars O. Carlsson Trad.-arr. Lars O. Carlsson	Linda Ulvaeus; Agnetha Fältskog, Linda Ulvaeus; Linda Ulvaeus, Agnetha Fältskog; Linda Ulvaeus; Linda Ulvaeus; Agnetha Fältskog Agnetha Fältskog, Linda Ulvaeus	(6:37) 0:48; 0:49; 0:54; 0:57; 0:47; 1:13 0:44
2.	"Hej, mitt vinterland"	Britt Lindeborg	Linda Ulvaeus	2:30
3.	"Så milt lyser stjärnan"	Trad.-arr. Lars O. Carlsson	Linda Ulvaeus	2:09
4.	"Mössens julafton"	Ulf Peder Olrog, Alf Proysen	Agnetha Fältskog	2:26
5.	"När det lider mot jul"	Ruben Liljefors, Jeanna Oterdahl	Agnetha Fältskog	2:33
Total length:				16:16

== Charts ==
Weekly charts for Nu tändas tusen juleljus.
Chart (1981)	Peak position
Swedish Albums (Sverigetopplistan)	6

== Personnel ==
The following musicians contributed to the recording of Nu tändas tusen juleljus:

- Agnetha Fältskog: vocals, producer
- Linda Ulvaeus: vocals
- Michael B. Tretow: producer, sound engineer
- Ola Brunkert: drums
- Rutger Gunnarsson: bass
- Anders Glenmark: guitar
- Åke Sundkvist: percussion
- Lasse Westmann: guitar
- Kjell Öhman: piano
- KOS Kyrkokör, directed by Gerd Hillert, arranged by Lars O. Carlsson
