= Jul med tradition =

Studio album by Anita Lindblom
- Released: 1975
- Genre: Christmas, schlager
- Label: Marilla
- Producer: Johan Röhr

Anita Lindblom chronology
En dans på rosor (1974)	Jul med tradition (1975)	Anita på Börsen (1976)

Jul med tradition is a 1975 Anita Lindblom Christmas album. Sven-Olof Walldoffs's choir and band contribute, and the album was later rerelased at the EMI label in 1985 to cassette tape and in 1985 to CD.

== Track listing ==
1. Betlehems stjärna
2. Hosianna
3. Luciasången (Natten går tunga fjät)
4. Var hälsad, sköna morgonstund
5. Stilla natt (Stille Nacht, heilige Nacht)
6. Det är en ros utsprungen (Es ist ein Ros entsprungen)
7. Rudolf med röda mulen (Rudolph the Red-Nosed Reindeer)
8. Medley: dancing games
  1. Morsgrisar är vi allihopa
  2. Vi äro musikanter
  3. Räven raskar över isen
  4. Mormors lilla kråka
  5. Karusellen
9. Kring julgranen
10. Julbocken
11. White Christmas
