= Det är advent =

- Hymn
- English: This is Advent
- Occasion: Advent
- Text: by Britt G. Hallqvist
- Language: Swedish
- Melody: by Bertil Hallin
- Published: 1977

"Det är advent" or Ett litet barn av Davids hus, is a Swedish Advent song with lyrics written by Britt G. Hallqvist in 1966 and music by Olle Widestrand. Music is often mentioned to have been published in 1981, but sources say the tune is older, and was in use already in the 1970s, as the song is published in Swedish 1977 children’s songbook Smått å Gott.

During SVT's Luciamorgon in 2014 the song lyrics were performed to a tune credited traditional from Latin America.

== Publication ==
- Smått å Gott, 1977
- Psalmer och Sånger 1987 as number 485 entitled "Ett litet barn av Davids hus", under the lines "Advent".
- Segertoner 1988 as number 443 entitled "Ett litet barn av Davids hus", under the lines "Advent".
- Verbums psalmbokstillägg 2003 as number 736 entitled "Ett litet barn av Davids hus", under the lines "Advent".
- Frälsningsarméns sångbok 1990 as number 718 under the lines "Kyrkoårets högtider, Advent".
- Julens önskesångbok, 1997, under the lines "Advent".

== Recordings ==
The song was recorded by the Glenmark Family on 1983 album Från advent till jul.
