= Karusellen =

Karusellen may refer to:

- Karusellen (song), also known as Jungfru skär.
- Karusellen (radio programme) – led by Lennart Hyland.
- Carousel (1923 film), Swedish 1923 film directed by Dimitri Buchowetzki
