= Olle Widestrand =

Swedish parish-musician, teacher, and composer (1932–2018)

- Born: July 9, 1932
- Died: March 25, 2018 (aged 85) Jönköping, Sweden
- Genres: children's songs, Christian hymns
- Occupations: parish-musician, teacher, composer

John Olof "Olle" Widestrand (9 July 1932 – 25 March 2018), was a Swedish parish-musician, teacher and composer. He is represented in Den svenska psalmboken 1986 with two works (number 61 and 90) and several other hymnals with one hymn. He has written several children's songs and published songbooks and educational materials for schools. He lived in the town of Jönköping until his death.

== Hymns ==
- Blott i det öppna (1986 number 90), lyrics by Britt G. Hallqvist set to music 1974 by Olle Widestrand and re-written by himself 1980
- Det är advent (also known as "Ett litet barn av Davids hus) in several hymnals
- Lågorna är många (1986 number 61), set to music in 1974, lyrics by Anders Frostenson.
