= Julbocken (song) =

Song
- Language: Swedish
- Published: 1913
- Genre: children, Christmas
- Songwriter: Alice Tegnér

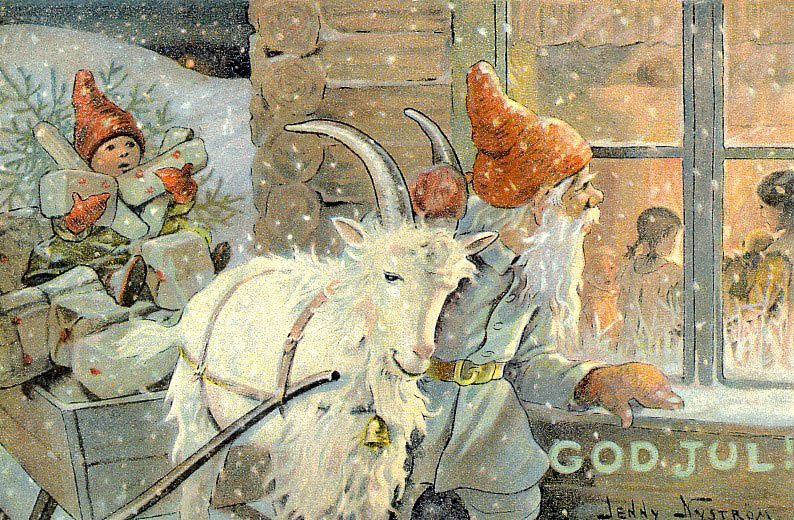
The song describes when the Christmas goat still brought the presents (Note: 19th century Swedish Christmas card, God Jul by Jenny Nyström)

"Julbocken", with the opening lines "En jul när mor var liten", (Note: "One Christmas when Mother was small") is a Christmas song written by Alice Tegnér. The lyrics describe a time when the Julbocken (Yule goat or Christmas goat) was still a more popular Christmas gift-bringer in Sweden than the Jultomten (Christmas elves or gnomes) (Note: Cf. Brownie (folklore)) or Santa Claus. The lyrics describe the goat giving presents, a doll for "Mother" when she was a child, who was frightened when the goat jumped; and for her brother, a drum and a trumpet. When the goat is old, he returns to "Mother", who now has children of her own.

== Publications ==
- Sjung med oss, Mamma! 6, 1913

== Recordings ==
A recording was done by Alice Babs in Stockholm in November 1963. Another recording was done by pupils from Stockholms musikgymnasium and Stockholms musikklasser on the 1972 album God morgon, mitt herrskap. The song was also recorded by Anita Lindblom on her 1975 Christmas album Jul med tradition.
