= Vattenvisan =

Song
- Language: Swedish
- Published: 1960
- Genre: children
- Composer: Lille Bror Söderlundh
- Lyricist: Lennart Hellsing

Vattenvisan ("The Water Song") is a children's song with lyrics by Lennart Hellsing and Lille Bror Söderlundh, and published in 1960 in Våra visor 3. The song was written for the school radio programme Bara vanligt vatten in 1957, and originally had seven verses. During publication, two of them were removed.

== Publication ==
- Våra visor 3, 1960
- Barnvisboken, 1977, as "Dripp dropp dripp dropp (Vattenvisan)"
- Smått å gott, 1977
- Barnens svenska sångbok, 1999, under the lines "Sånger för småfolk".
- Barnvisor och sånglekar till enkelt komp, 1984

== Recordings ==
An early recording was done by Kerstin Andeby's children's choir & Peter Wanngren's band, and originally released as a record in 1995.
