= Jag vill ha en egen måne =

Single by Ted Gärdestad

from the album Undringar
- A-side: "Jag vill ha en egen måne"
- B-side: "När du kommer"
- Released: April 1972
- Genre: Vispop, soft rock, folk rock
- Label: Polar
- Songwriters: Ted Gärdestad; Kenneth Gärdestad

Ted Gärdestad singles chronology
"Jag vill ha en egen måne" (1972)	"Jag ska fånga en ängel" (1973)

"Jag vill ha en egen måne" (English: I want my own moon) is a song written by Swedish lyricist Kenneth Gärdestad and singer-songwriter Ted Gärdestad. Ted Gärdestad recorded the song, and released it as a single (Polar POS 1155) in April 1972. The song became his breakthrough, charting at Svensktoppen, where it stayed for 14 weeks between 11 June and 10 September 1972, topping the charts. All ABBA members appeared in the studio during the recording; Anni-Frid Lyngstad and Agneta Fältskog appear as background singers.

The song has also been recorded by Thorleifs on the 1978 album Kurragömma and Wahlströms låten on 2010 album Vårt älskade 80-tal.

A rock-version was performed by the Gamblers at Dansbandskampen 2009.
