= Prästens lilla kråka =

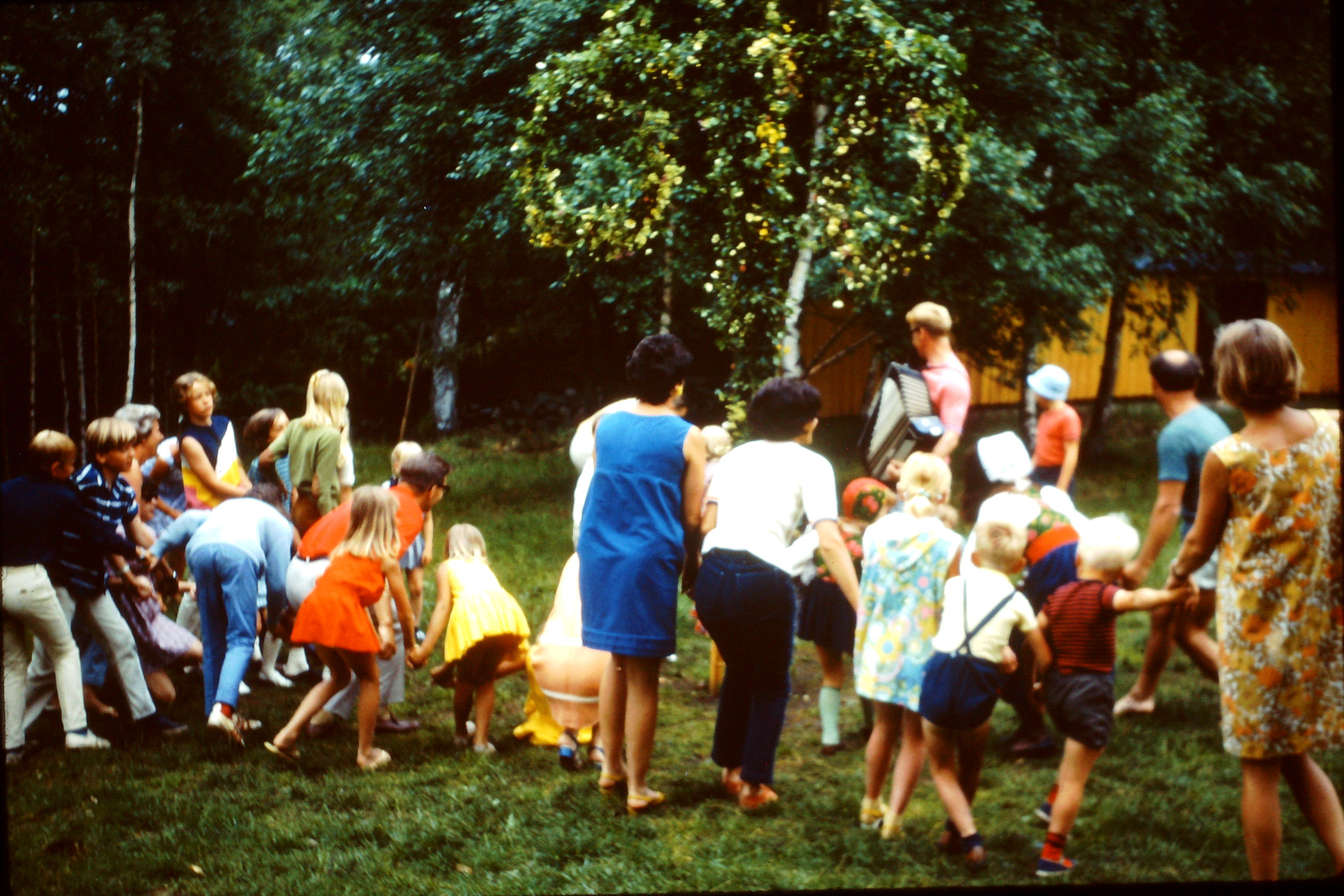
Midsummer dance to prästens lilla kråka in Årsnäs in Sweden in 1969. The participants are about to pull themselves towards the midsummer pole.

Prästens lilla kråka is a Swedish singing game, now also a children's song, which is used when dancing around the Christmas tree and the Midsummer pole. There are several versions of whose little crow it is, for example mormors ("grandmother's"), mosters ("aunt's"), prostens (the provost's) and so on. However, prästens (the priest's) is the most common.

When dancing around the Christmas tree or the midsummer pole the ring of people is moving inwards and outwards, before being split up and finally throwing themselves on the floor or grass.

When sung with a child in the knee, the child is rocked in one direction, and the person singing it moves in the other direction and when the lyrics come to "slank han/hon ned i diket" the singer removes his thigh to make the child feel it will fall down.

== Recordings ==
An early recording was done as an acoustic version by Eric Sellin in Stockholm in 1912 as "Gammal polska från Nerike (Prestens krage)", and the record was released the same year. Another early recording was done by Anna Jönsdotter in August 1898.

The song has also been recorded by Glenmarks on the 1974 Christmas album Jul a la carte, and by Anita Lindblom on the 1975 Christmas album Jul med tradition.
