= Räven raskar över isen =

"Räven raskar över isen" (Swedish), or "Reven rasker over isen" (Norwegian) or "Ræven rasker over isen" (Danish) ("The Fox Hurries Across the Ice") is an old Scandinavian folksong performed as a singing game when dancing around the Christmas tree and in Sweden also the midsummer pole. The opening verses are often "flickornas visa" ((in Swedish; the "girls' song"), where the participants curtsey) or "pojkarnas visa" ((in Swedish; the "boys' song"), where the participants bow). After that, the verses may vary. However, in Swedish the "songs" of Grin-Olle and Skratt-Olle ("crybaby Olle" and "laughing Olle") are common.

According to the Olaus Rudbeck's historical compilation Atlantica the song opens: "Hå, hå, Räfwen han låckar på isen". In the 1950 Carl-Herman Tillhagen and Nils Deckers compilation Svenska folkvisor och danser is a version opening with the line "Räven raskar över riset".

== Publication ==
- Lek med toner, 1971 (as "Sånglek")
- Julens önskesångbok, 1997, under the heading "Nyare julsånger", also under "Tjugondag Knut dansas julen ut"
- Barnens svenska sångbok, 1999, under the heading "Sång med lek och dans"

== Recordings ==
An early recording was made by Margareta Schömström in Stockholm in May 1925; the record was released in January 1926. The song has also been recorded by Anita Lindblom on the 1975 Christmas album Jul med tradition.

== Film music ==
The song was also used as film music for the 1987 film Mer om oss barn i Bullerbyn.

== Other versions ==
During the early 1970's, Gullan Bornemark wrote two new lyrics versions of the same versions. Both of them were traffic-related, and appeared in her Anita och Televinken show. "Strunta i att gå i vägen" ("Ignore going in the way") deals with, for example, not following after emergency vehicles like the fire truck during accidents not involving oneself, and "Hej, nu åker vi" ("Hey, let's ride") is a wintertime song arguing for the hillside being the best place to ride the toboggan or the pulk, as opposed to the road, which is made for motor vehicles like cars and buses.

Over the 2002–2003 Christmas and holiday season, a film from the Swedish Environmental Protection Agency about the greenhouse effect and global warming was often shown as a television commercial. Depicting a fictional Knut's dance in the future, the participants were children, singing "Räven simmar över sjön" ("the fox swims across the lake") instead of "Räven raskar över isen" ("The fox runs across the ice") and crawling on the floor; pretending to be foxes swimming through lake water, before throwing the Christmas tree out in the rain. What was feared was a future Sweden, where children in an era of global warming would no longer be aware of ice and frozen waters.
