= Hej, sa Petronella =

Song
- Language: Swedish
- Published: 1957
- Genre: children
- Composer: Knut Brodin
- Lyricist: Lennart Hellsing

"Hej, sa Petronella" is a song with lyrics by Lennart Hellsing and music by Knut Brodin, and published in 1957 in Våra visor I. The song deals with fictional person Petronella from Plaskeby (from the Swedish verb plaska, "to splash", and the noun by, "village"), and the theme is trying to be happy in all conditions and weather. Creating a boat out of items is a common theme in many fairy tales. The melody is based on a folk tune.

== Recordings ==
An early recording was done by Parkskolan in Västerhaninge on the 1971 album Lek med toner 2.

== Publication ==
- Barnens svenska sångbok, 1999, under the lines "Sånger för småfolk".
