= Christian child's prayer =

Easily memorable prayers recited by children

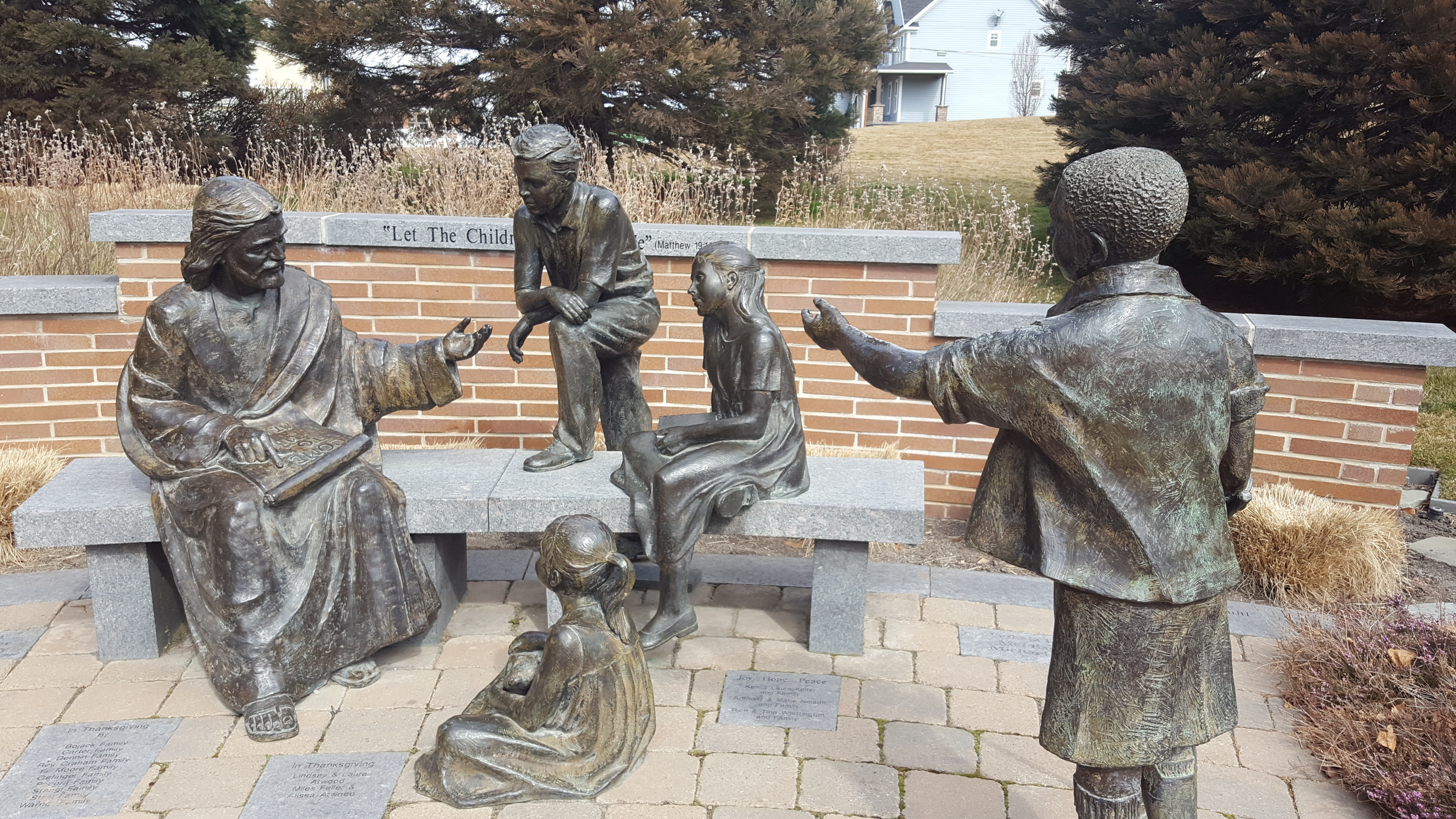
Jesus teaching the children, outside Saint John the Baptist Catholic Church, Draper, Utah

A Christian child's prayer is Christian prayer recited primarily by children that is typically short, rhyming, or has a memorable tune. It is usually said before bedtime, to give thanks for a meal, or as a nursery rhyme. Many of these prayers are either quotes from the Bible, or set traditional texts.

While termed "Christian child's prayer", the examples here are almost exclusively used and promoted by Protestants. Catholic and Orthodox Christians have their own set of children's prayers, often invoking Mary, Mother of Jesus, angels, or the saints, and including a remembrance of the dead. Some adult prayers are equally popular with children, such as the Golden Rule (Luke 6:31, Matthew 7:12), the Doxology, the Serenity Prayer, John 3:16, Psalm 145:15–16, Psalm 136:1, and for older children, The Lord's Prayer and Psalm 23.

== Bedtime prayer ==
=== The New England Primer ===
Evening Prayer from the 1777 New England Primer

== Morning prayer ==
=== Luther's morning prayer ===
I thank Thee, my Heavenly Father, through Jesus Christ, Thy dear Son, that Thou hast kept me this night from all harm and danger; and I pray Thee to keep me this day also from sin and all evil, that all my doings and life may please Thee. For into Thy hands I commend myself, my body and soul, and all things. Let Thy holy angel be with me, that the Wicked Foe may have no power over me. Amen.

=== The New England Primer ===
Morning prayer from the 1777 New England Primer:

Almighty God the Maker of every thing in Heaven and Earth; the Darkness goes away, and the Day light comes at thy Command. Thou art good and doest good continually. I thank thee that thou has taken such Care of me this Night, and that I am alive and well this Morning. Save me, O God, from Evil, all this Day long, and let me love and serve thee forever, for the Sake of Jesus Christ thy Son. Amen.

== Giving thanks ==
=== All Good Gifts ===
The chorus to We Plough the Fields and Scatter may be used as a table grace.

=== For this Food ===
For this food and joy renewed, we praise your name, O Lord!

== Organized prayer ==
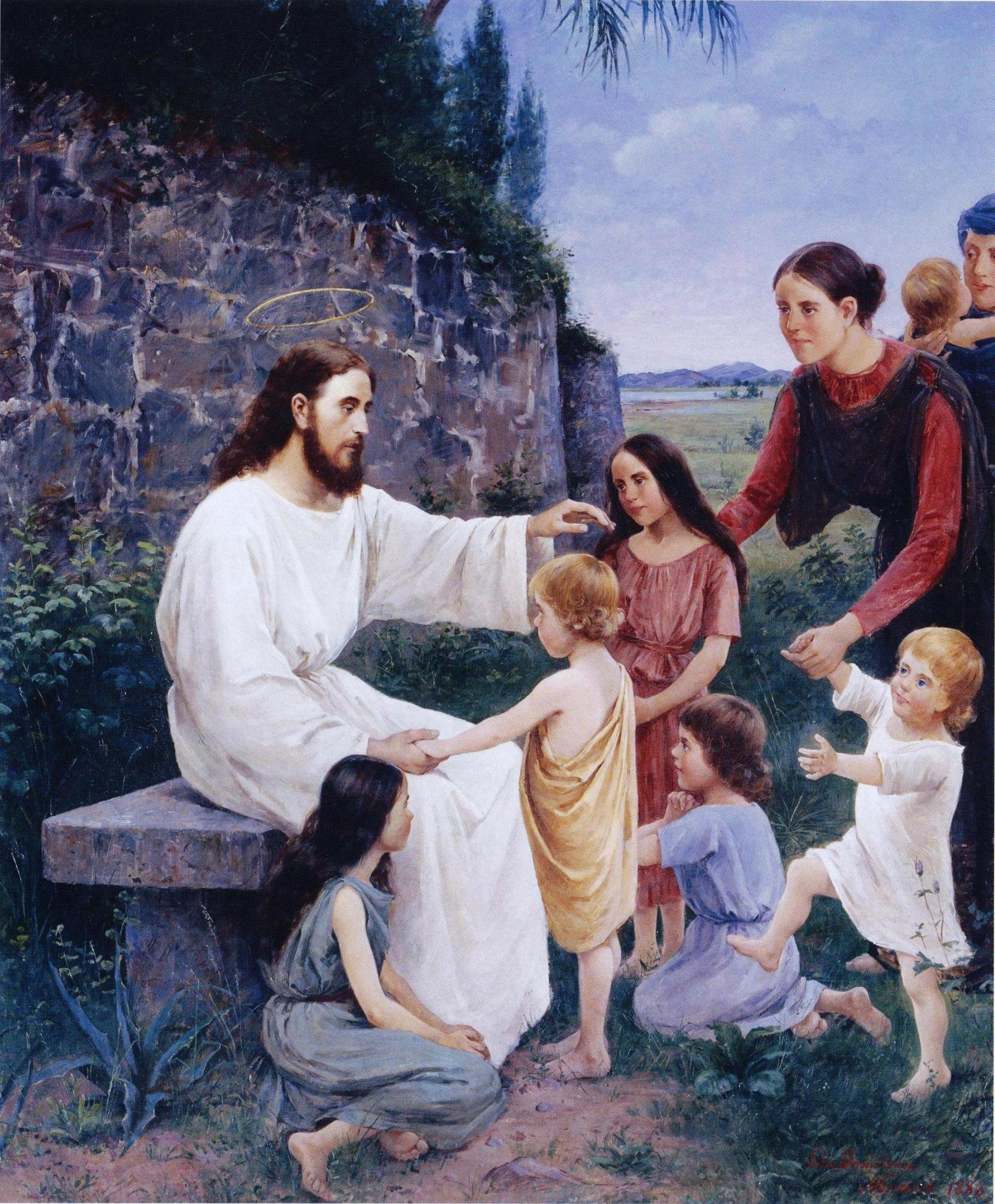
Jesus Blesses Children, from an 1888 altarpiece by Elin Danielson-Gambogi in Ahlainen, Finland.

== Spirituals ==
=== He's Got the Whole World in his Hands ===
He's Got the Whole World in His Hands

== Other songs ==
- Oil in My Lamp
- Zacchaeus
- This Little Light of Mine
- I've Got the Joy Joy Joy Joy
- Children of the Heavenly Father – original in Swedish, Tryggare kan ingen vara.
- My Tribute (To God Be The Glory)
- Seek Ye First
- Jesus Bids Us Shine
- Den blomstertid nu kommer – Swedish song
- Vi sätter oss i ringen – Swedish song
- All Things Bright and Beautiful - by Cecil Frances Alexander

== Historical songbooks ==
- Divine Songs Attempted in Easy Language for the Use of Children by Isaac Watts, 1715
- Hymns for the Amusement of Children by Christopher Smart, 1771
- Hymns in Prose for Children by Anna Laetitia Barbauld, 1781
- Hymns for Little Children by Cecil Frances Alexander, 1848

== Print sources ==
- Bobb, Barry All God's People Sing. St. Louis: Concordia Publishing House, 1992, 316 pp.
- English Evangelical Lutheran Synod of Missouri and other States. Sunday-School Hymnal. Pittsburgh: American Lutheran Publication Board, 1901, 464 pp.
- O'Neal, Debbie Trafton Thank you for This Food: Action Prayers, Songs, and Blessings for Mealtime. Minneapolis: Augsburg Fortress, 1994, 32 pp.
- Johnson, David A. My First Hymnal. St. Louis: Concordia Publishing House, 2011, 128 pp.
- Kirkpatrick, William J. Joy and praise: a Sunday-school song book Cincinnati, Ohio: Fillmore Music House, 1908, 266 pp.
- Wesleyan Methodist Church The Methodist Sunday-school hymn-book, compiled by direction of the Wesleyan-methodist conference London: Wesleyan-Methodist Sunday-School Union, 1879, 488 pp.
