= Tomten och haren =

Swedish song

Tomten och haren, or I ett hus vid skogens slut, is a song often used as a Christmas song, but also used as a mimic song. The song is often sung among children, and the lyrics deal with a Santa Claus/elf/tomte figure sitting inside a cottage noticing a hare, saving it from the hunter by allowing it into safety inside the cottage. The tune is of unknown origin, but is reminiscent of the Sunday school song Är du glad av hjärtat nöjd, and the Evert Taube song Flickan i Havanna.

== Publication ==
- Lek med toner, 1971 (credited as "game song")
- Barnens svenska sångbok, 1999, under the lines "Sånger med lek och dans"

== Recordings ==
An early recording, with arrangement by Plinque plonque musique, was released on a cassette tape in 1989.
