= Den svenska sångboken =

1997 Swedish song book by Anders Palm and Johan Stenström

Den svenska sångboken ("The Swedish Song book") is a 1997 Swedish book with 331 songs (in 2003 a new version with 365 songs was published), written by Anders Palm and Johan Stenström. It was followed by the 1999 book Barnens svenska sångbok ("Children's Swedish Song book").

The book includes the most famous Swedish songs from earlier time until present, and the songwriters are among Carl Michael Bellman, Birger Sjöberg, Evert Taube, Lars Forssell, Olle Adolphson, Ulf Lundell, Mikael Wiehe, Lasse Berghagen, Benny Andersson, Eva Dahlgren, Lisa Ekdahl, Lasse Dahlquist and Åsa Jinder. In the end of the books there are comments and references to the songs.
