= Västanfors Church =

Coordinates: 59°59′16″N 15°48′22″E

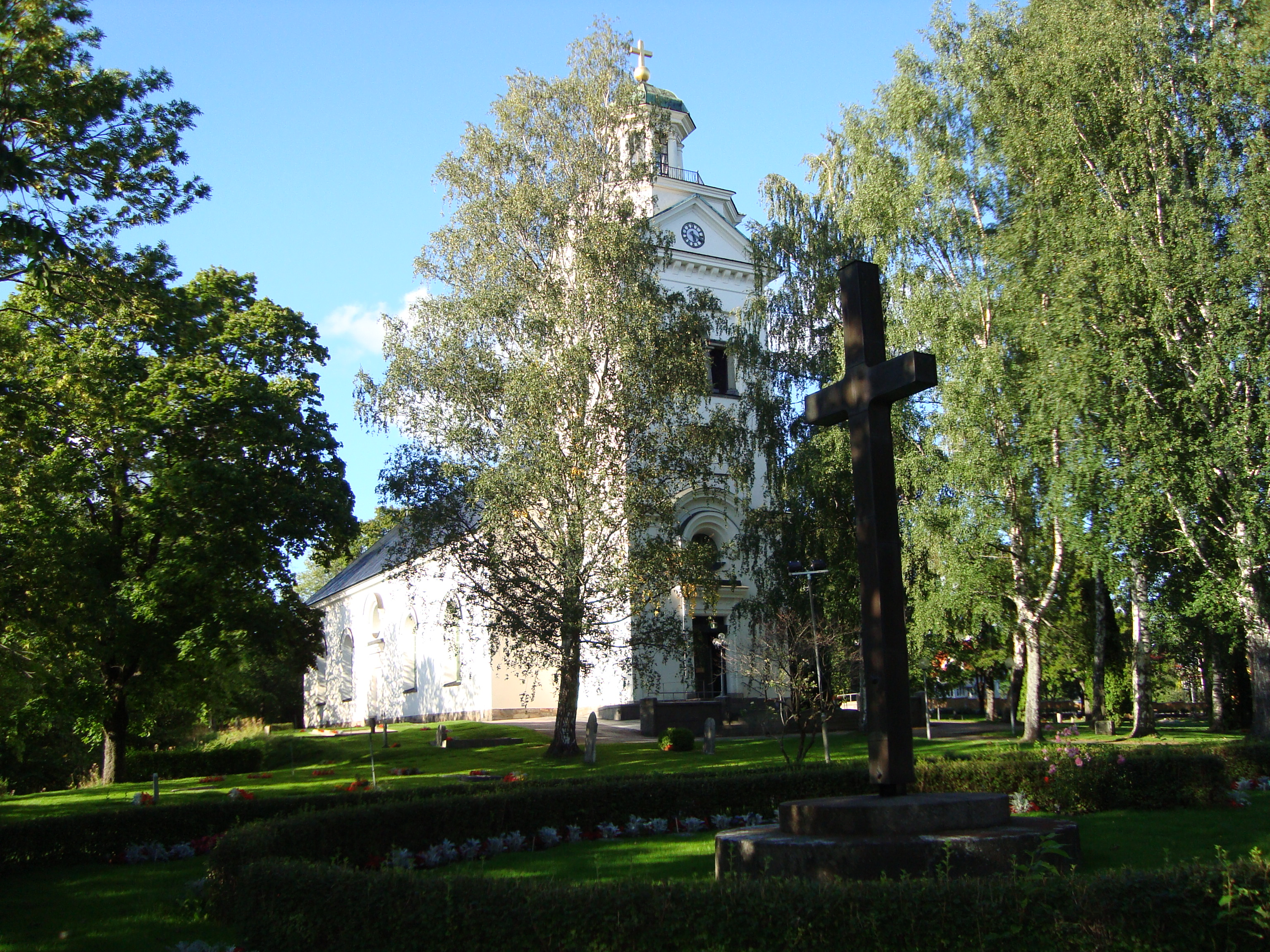
Västanfors Church

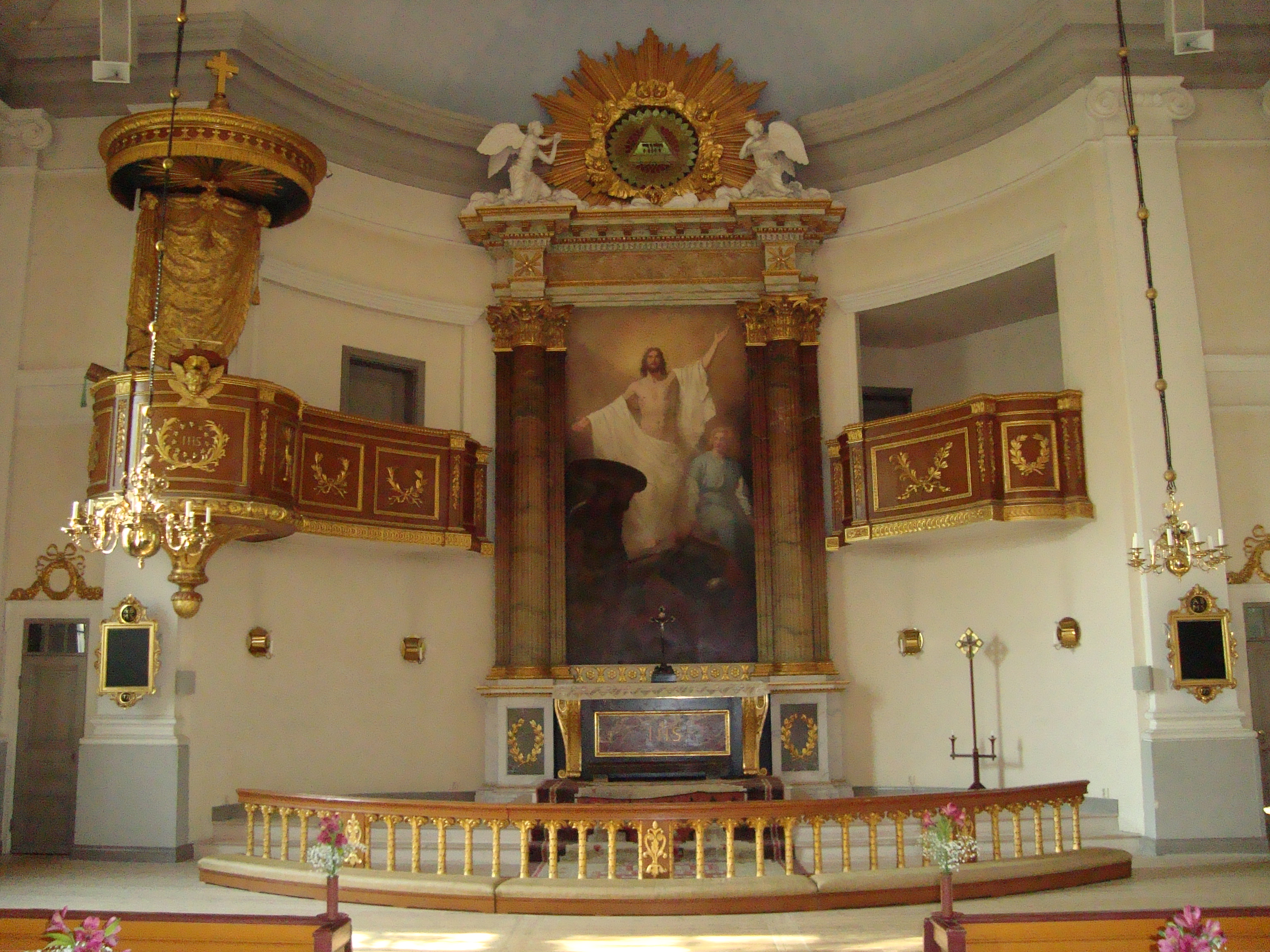
Västanfors Church altar

Västanfors Church (Swedish: Västanfors kyrka) is located at Västanfors in Fagersta Municipality, Västmanland County, Sweden.

== History ==
Before the church was built, a wood church was built in 1642. Drawings for a new church were established in 1818 by architect Lorens Axel Fredrik Almfelt (1781-1844). The present church building was built in1824–27 and opened in 1830. The last renovation of the church was in 1987–88, according to a drawing by architect Jerk Alton.
