= Västanfors =

Coordinates: 59°59′28″N 15°48′58″E

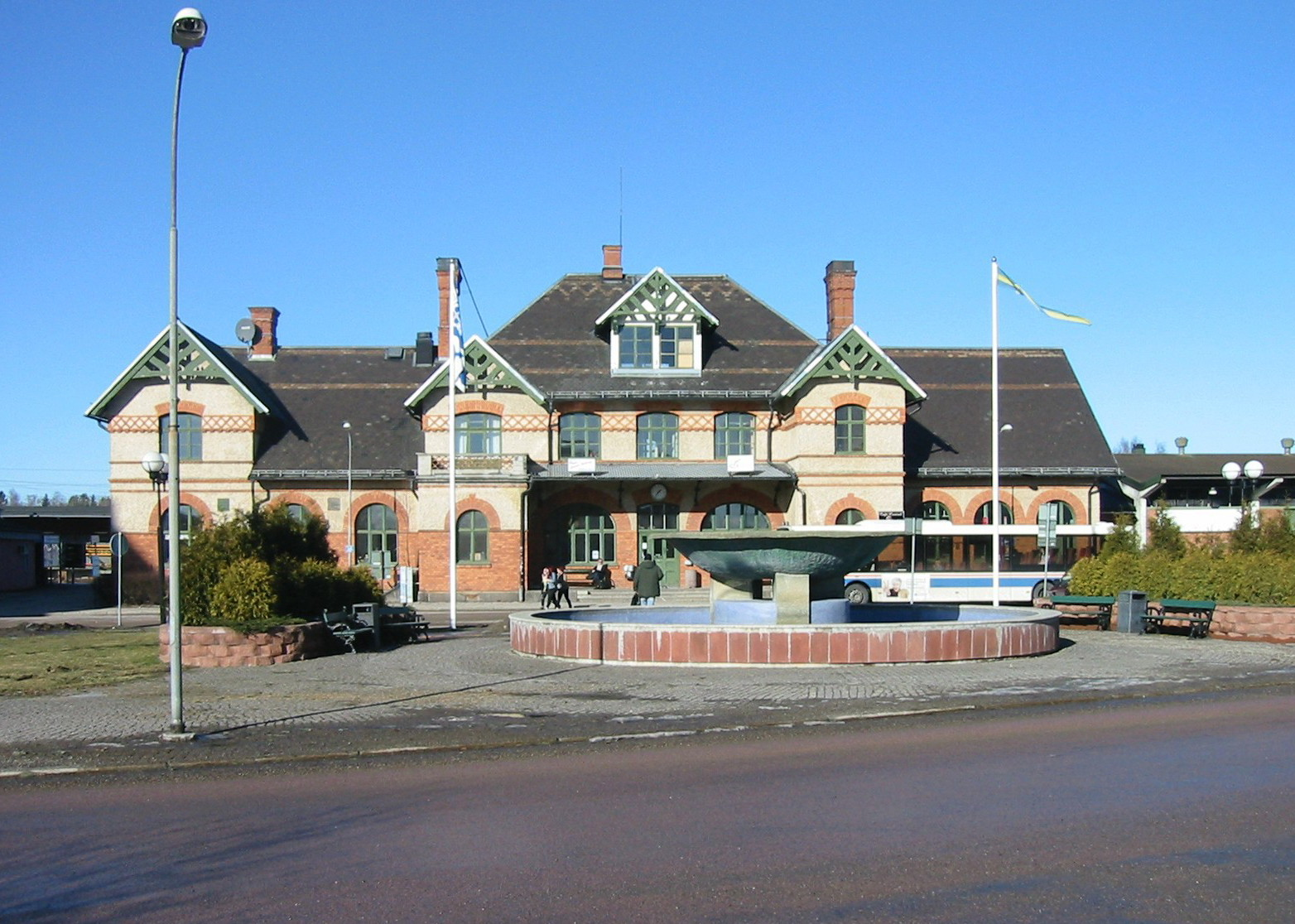
Fagersta Central Station is located in Västanfors

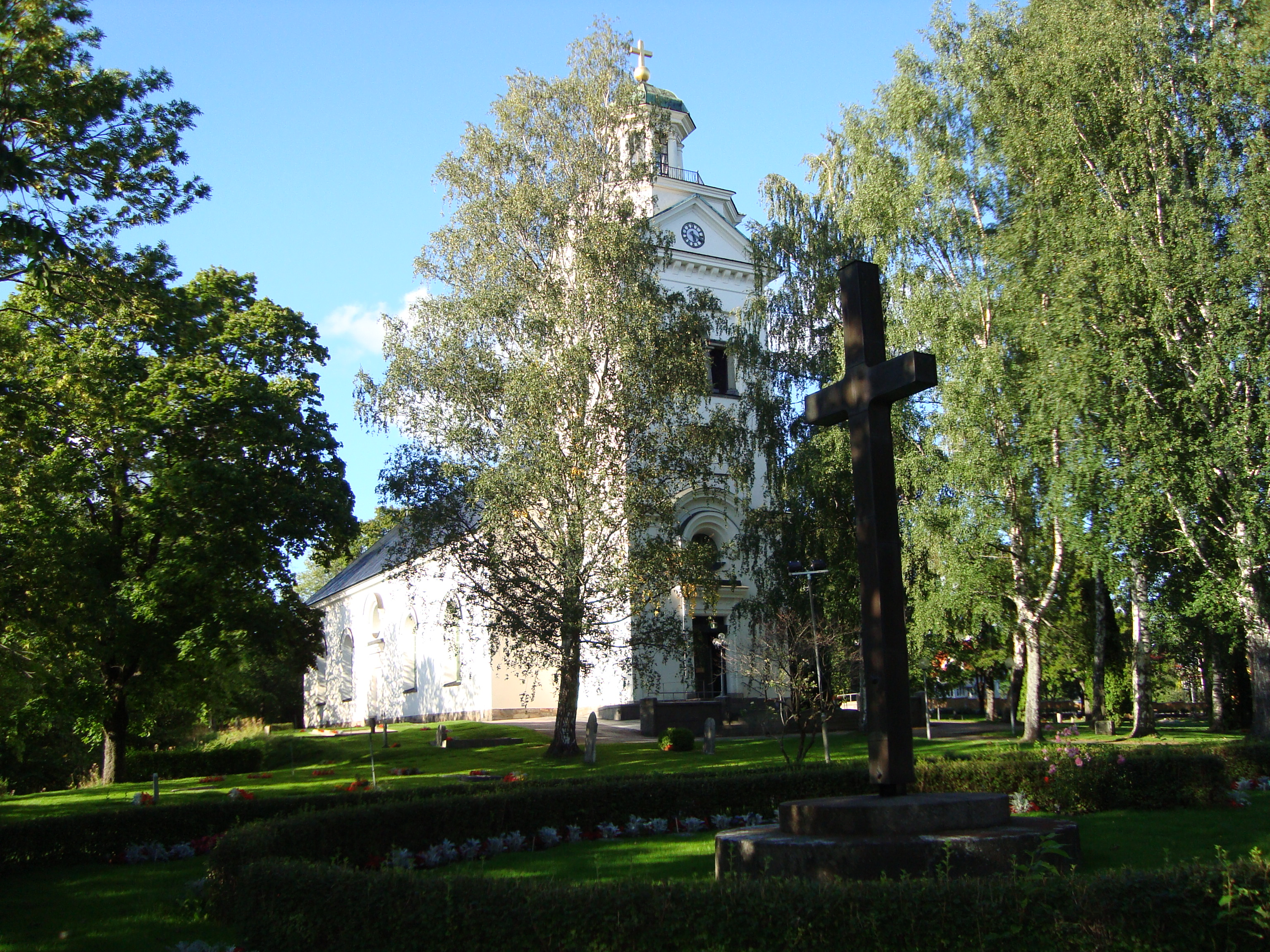
Västanfors Church

Västanfors is a district (stadsdel) of Fagersta and is located in Fagersta Municipality, Sweden.

== Notable People From Västanfors ==
- Anitra Steen, Swedish civil servant, politician, and spouse of Sweden's former prime minister Göran Persson.
- Rune Lindström, Swedish screenwriter and actor.
- Lennart Hellsing, Swedish writer and translator.
- Per "Pelle" Almqvist, also known as "Howlin' Pelle Almqvist", Swedish singer and songwriter, lead singer of garage rock band The Hives.
