= Vårt älskade 80-tal =

Studio album by Wahlströms
- Released: 2 June 2010
- Genre: modern dansband music
- Length: 43.49 minutes
- Label: Kavalkad
- Producer: Tobias Nyström

Wahlströms chronology
Om du vore här (2008)	Vårt älskade 80-tal (2010)

Vårt älskade 80-tal is a Wahlströms studio album, released on 2 June 2010, mostly consisting of recordings of 1980s songs. It also included the newly-written song "Anna".

== Track listing ==
#	Title	Writer	Length
1.	"Oh Julie"	Shakin' Stevens, Monica Forsberg	2.34
2.	"Ord (Words)"	Robert Fitoussi, Monica Forsberg	3.31
3.	"Låt det svänga (La det swinge)"	Rolf Løvland, Ingela "Pling" Forsman	2.54
4.	"När kärleken föds" ("It Must Have Been Love")	Per Gessle, Ingela "Pling" Forsman	4.27
5.	"Rock n' Roll is King"	Jonas Warnerbring, Susanne Wigforss	3.12
6.	"Jag vill ha en egen måne"	Kenneth Gärdestad, Ted Gärdestad	3.23
7.	"Ge mig ditt namn, ditt nummer" ("Give Me Your Name, Give Me Your Number")	Clive Lonie, Tommy Hagman	2.45
8.	"Islands in the Stream"	Maurice Gibb, Barry Gibb, Robin Gibb	3.38
9.	"Guardian Angel"	Chris Evans-Ironside, Kurt Gebergen	4.22
10.	"Marie, Marie"	Dave Alvin, Lars Wiggman	2.37
11.	"Anna"	Leif Melander	3.14
12.	"Diggi-loo diggi-ley"	Torgny Söderberg, Torgny Söderberg	3.05
13.	"Nothing's Gonna Change My Love for You"	Gerry Goffin, Michael Masser	4.05

== Contributors ==
- Wahlströms
- Tobias Nyström - Producer

== Chart positions ==
Chart (2010)	Peak position
Sweden	23
