= Yule goat =

Scandinavian decorative Christmas straw goat

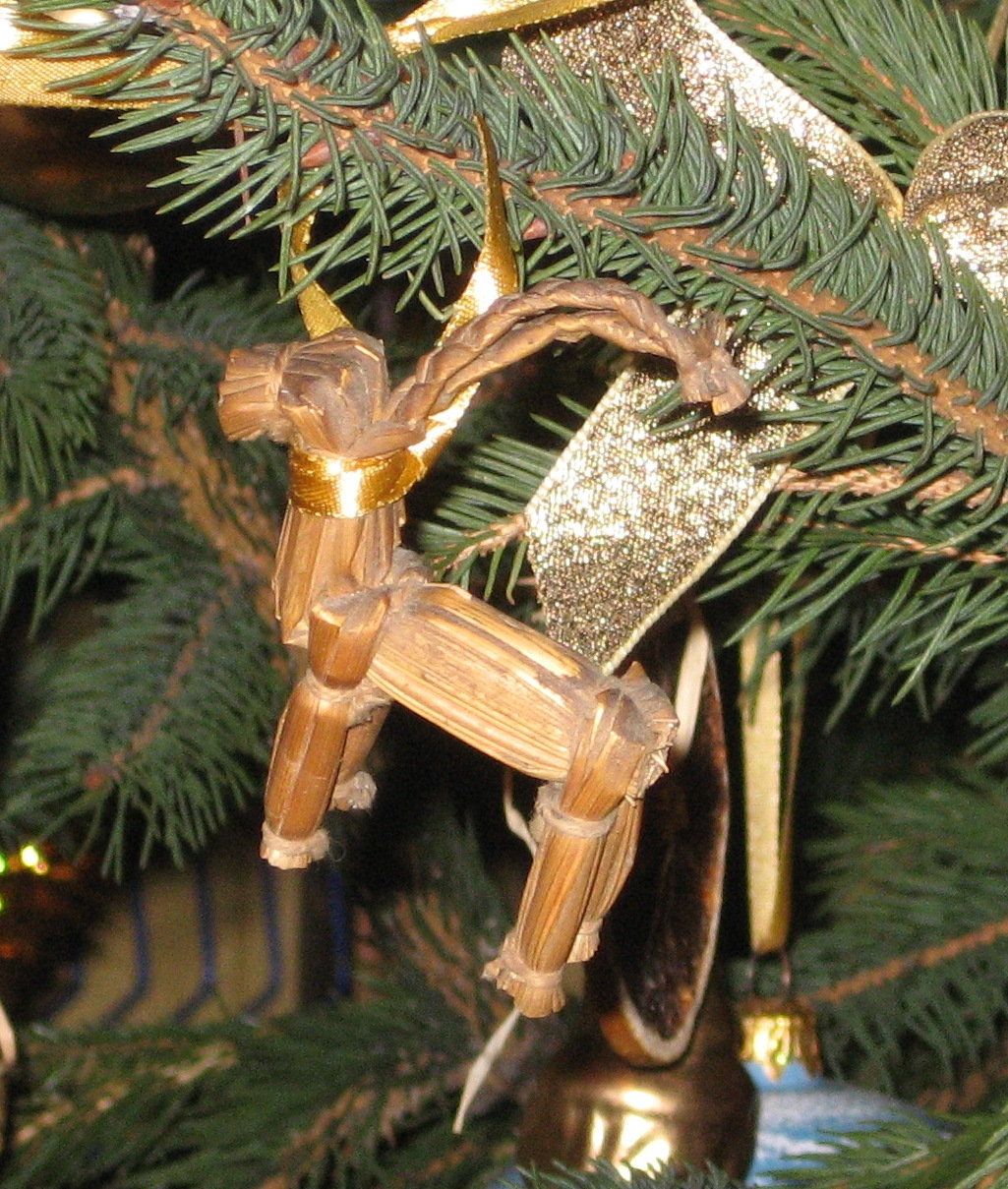
A Yule goat on a Christmas tree.

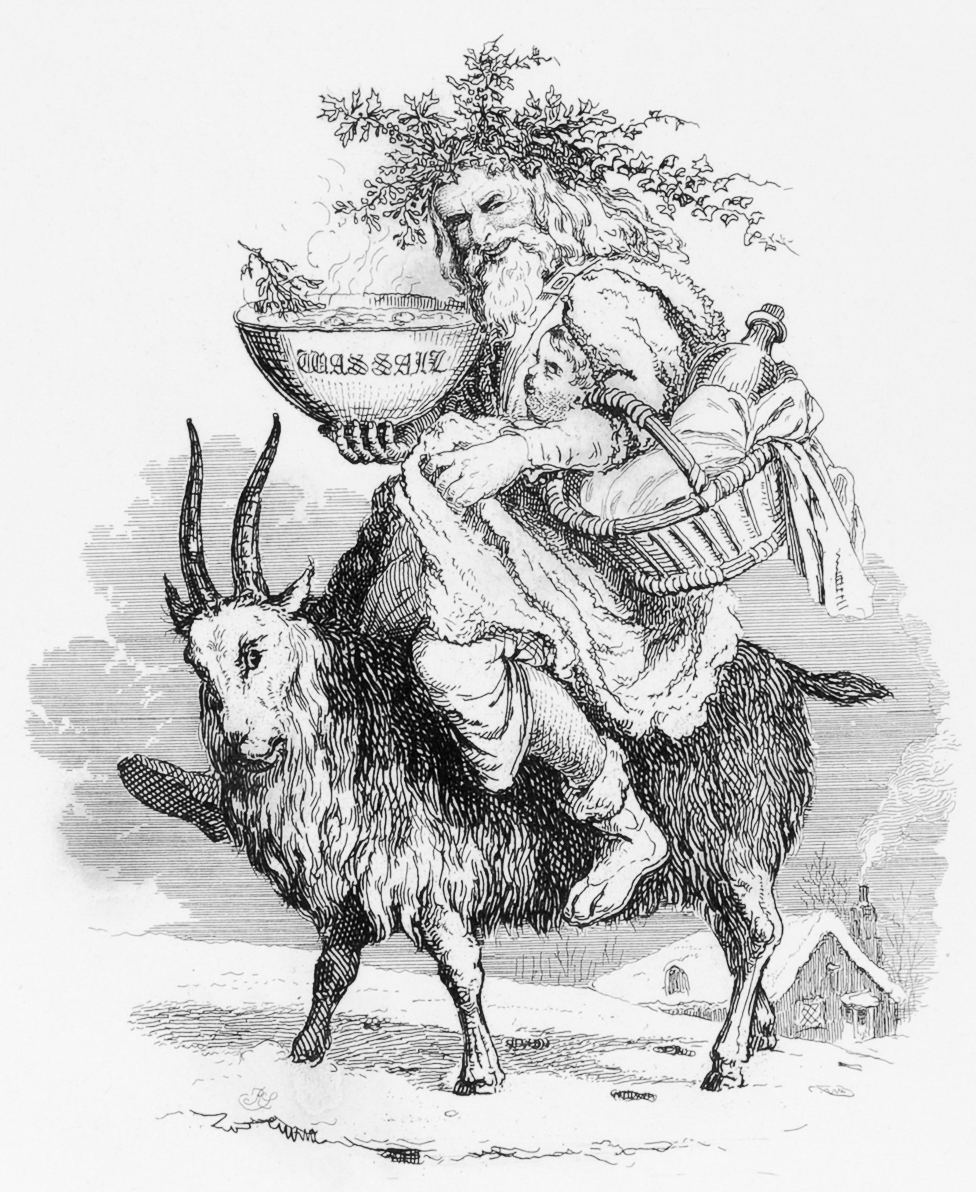
'Old Christmas', riding a yule goat; 1836 illustration by Robert Seymour

The Yule goat is a Scandinavian and Northern European Yule and Christmas symbol and tradition. Modern representations of the Yule goat are typically made of straw.

== History ==
While its origins are unclear, a popular theory is that the celebration of the goat is connected to worship of the Norse god Thor, who rode the sky in a chariot drawn by two goats, Tanngrisnir and Tanngnjóstr; it goes back to common Indo-European beliefs. The last sheaf of grain bundled in the harvest was credited with magical properties as the spirit of the harvest and saved for the Yule celebrations, called among other things Yule goat (Julbocken).

A man-sized goat figure is known from 11th-century remembrances of Childermas, where it was led by a man dressed as Saint Nicholas, symbolizing his control over the Devil.

Written mentions of the Yule goat as an established Yule tradition go back as far as the 16th and 17th centuries. One of the absolutely earliest mentions comes from the book Visitatsbog by theologian Peder Palladius, likely written some time between 1537-1560. In it, he mentions that the Yule goat had been banned by the landsting, along with other nighttime drinking traditions.

Other traditions are possibly related to the sheaf of corn called the Yule goat. In Sweden, people regarded the Yule goat as an invisible spirit that would appear some time before Christmas to make sure that the Yule preparations were done right. Objects made out of straw or roughly-hewn wood could also be called the Yule goat, and in older Scandinavian society a popular Christmas prank was to place this Yule goat in a neighbour's house without them noticing; the family successfully pranked had to get rid of it in the same way.

The function of the Yule goat has differed throughout the ages. In a Scandinavian custom similar to the English tradition of wassailing, held at either Christmas or Epiphany, young men in costumes would walk between houses singing songs, enacting plays and performing pranks. This tradition is known from the 17th century and still continues in certain areas. The group of Christmas characters would often include the Yule goat, a rowdy and sometimes scary creature demanding gifts.

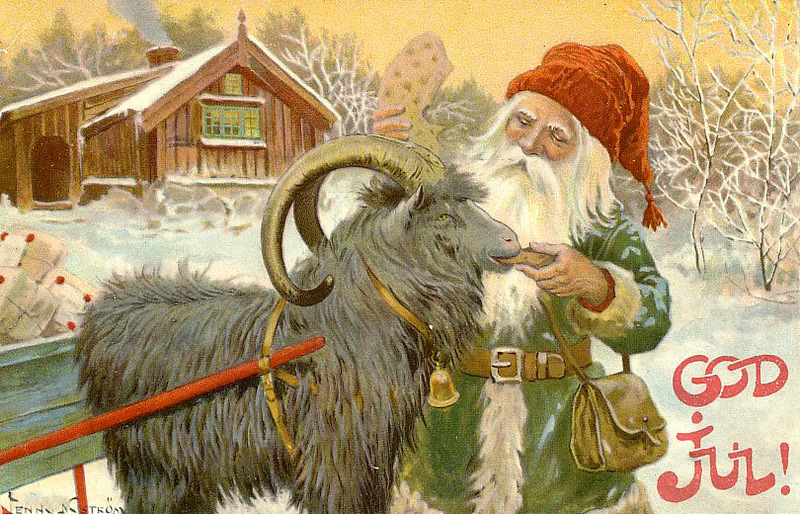
A 19th century Christmas card God Jul by Jenny Nyström.

During the 19th century the Yule goat's role all over Scandinavia shifted towards becoming the Christmas gift-bringer, with one of the men in the family dressing up as the Yule goat. In this, there might be a relation to Santa Claus and the Yule goat's origin in the medieval celebrations of Saint Nicholas. The goat was then replaced by the jultomte (Father Christmas/Santa Claus) or julenisse during the second half of the 19th century and early 20th century, although he is still called the Joulupukki (Yule goat) in Finland, and the tradition of the man-sized goat disappeared.

== The modern Yule goat ==
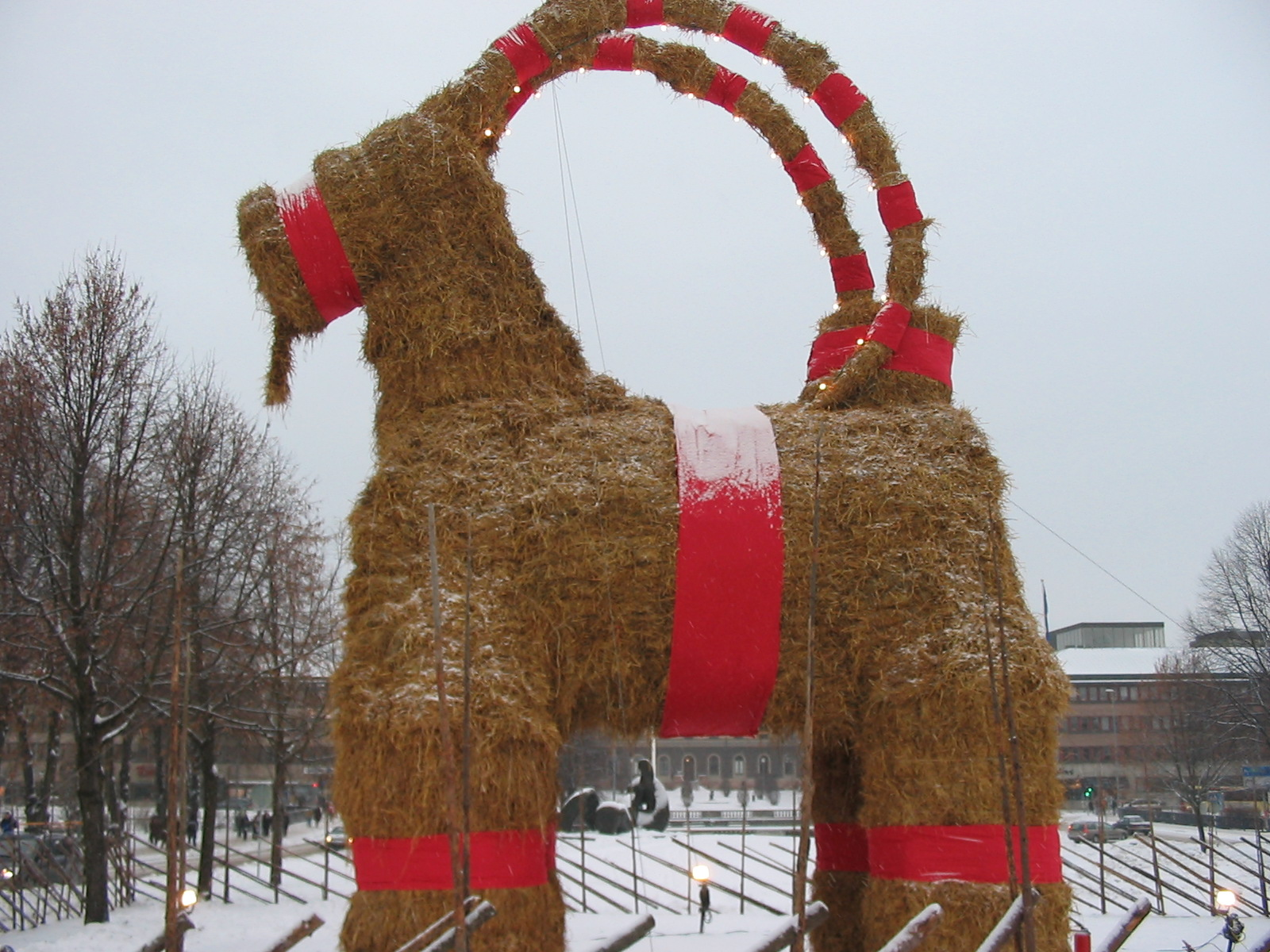
A Swedish Gävle goat (Gävlebocken).

The Yule goat in Nordic countries today is best known as a Christmas ornament. This modern version of the Yule goat figure is a decorative goat made out of straw and bound with red ribbons, a popular Christmas ornament often found under or on the Christmas tree. Large versions of this ornament are frequently erected in towns and cities around Christmas time; a tradition started with the Gävle goat in 1966. This tradition has been plagued by vandalism and arson. To prevent this, the ornament has been fortified in a variety of ways. However, this has simply resulted in more creative attempts to burn it down.

== Julebukking ==
Julebukking is a Christmas tradition of Scandinavian origin. Between Christmas and New Year's Day, people wearing masks and costumes (Julebukkers) go door to door, where neighbors receiving them attempt to identify who is under the disguise. In one version of Julebukking, people go door to door singing Christmas songs. After they have sung, they are usually rewarded with candy. Another tradition requires that at least one person from the visited household join the band of Julebukkers and continue to the next household.

In certain aspects, the custom resembled the modern-day tradition of Halloween trick-or-treating. Julebukkers will often disguise their voices and body language to further the masquerade. Offering people holiday treats and something to drink is customary. Once identities are known and the food is eaten, the Julebukkers continue to the next home.

== Popular culture ==
The Christmas goat is mentioned in many older Christmas songs dated back to the late 19th and early 20th century, when the Santa Claus tradition had not been fully established throughout Sweden. Among the songs are "Julbocken", "Julpolska" and "Raska fötter springa tripp, tripp, tripp".

== See also ==
- Joulupukki – Christmas figure from Finland
- Kekri (festival) – Finnish autumn festival
- Krampus – Christmas figure in Alpine folklore
- Namahage – Japanese folklore character associated with new year's ritual
- Ded Moroz – Christmas figure in eastern Slavic cultures

== Depictions ==
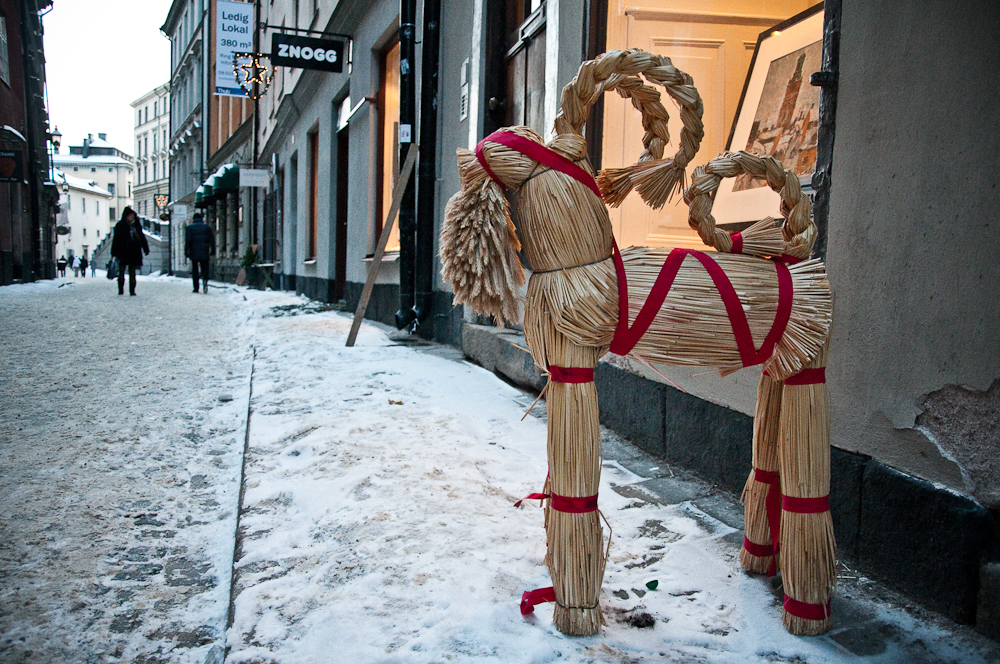
Yule goat in Stockholm

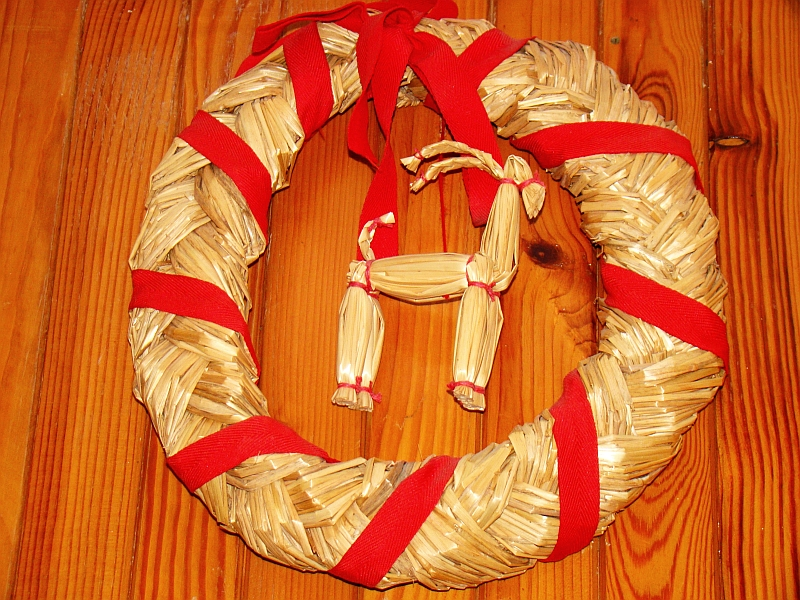
Straw Christmas tree ornaments

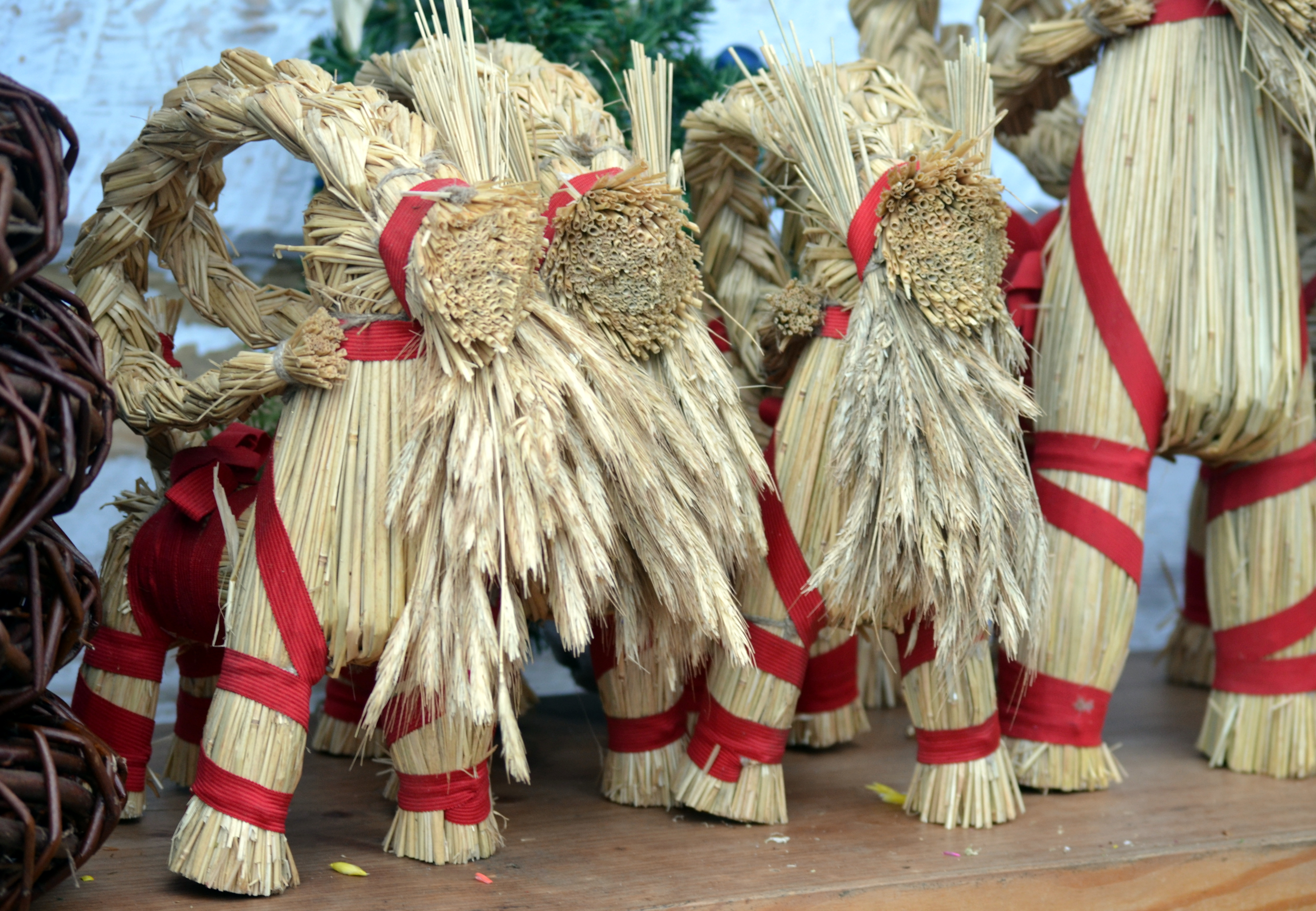
Yule goat ornaments in Poland

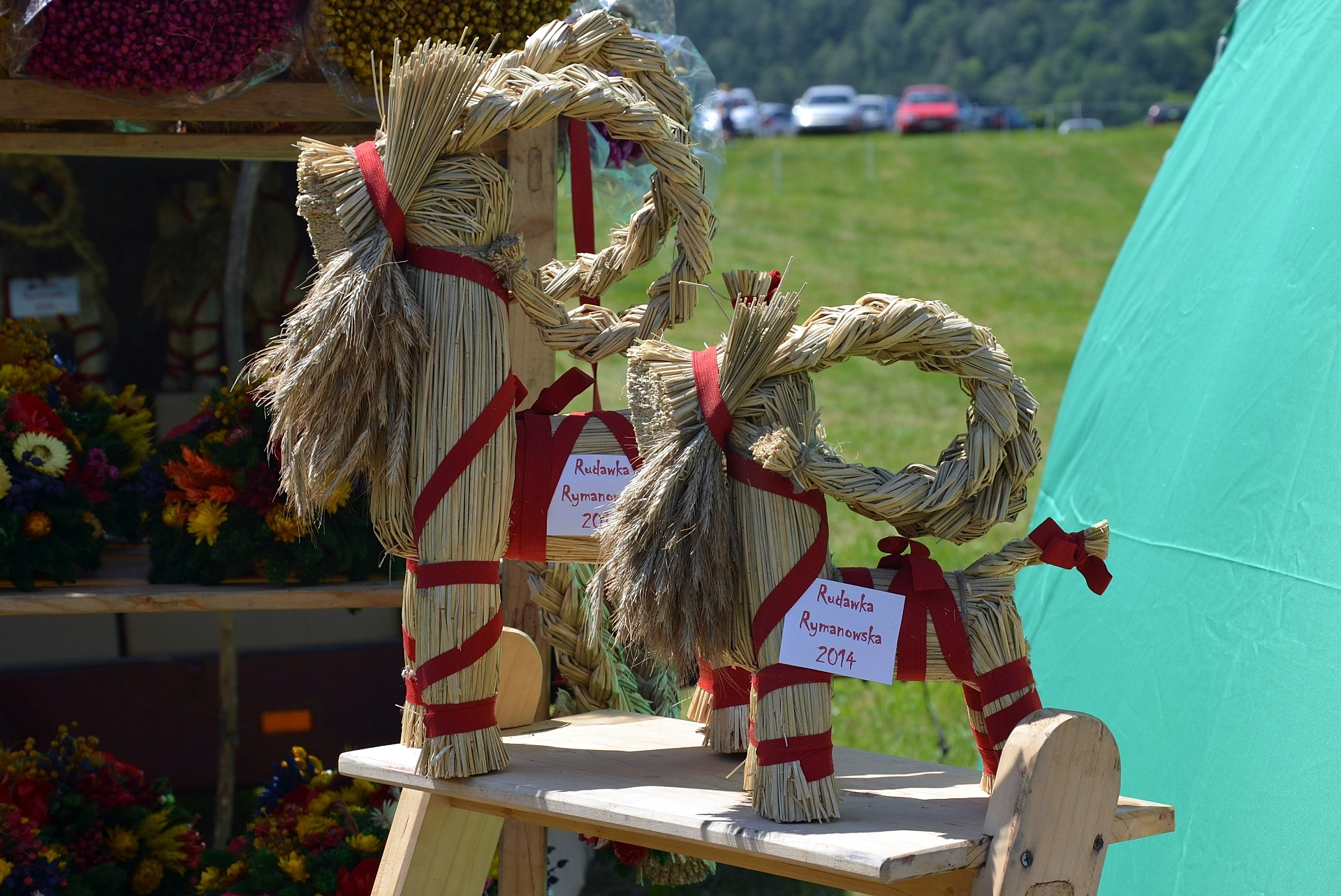
Yule goat ornaments in Poland

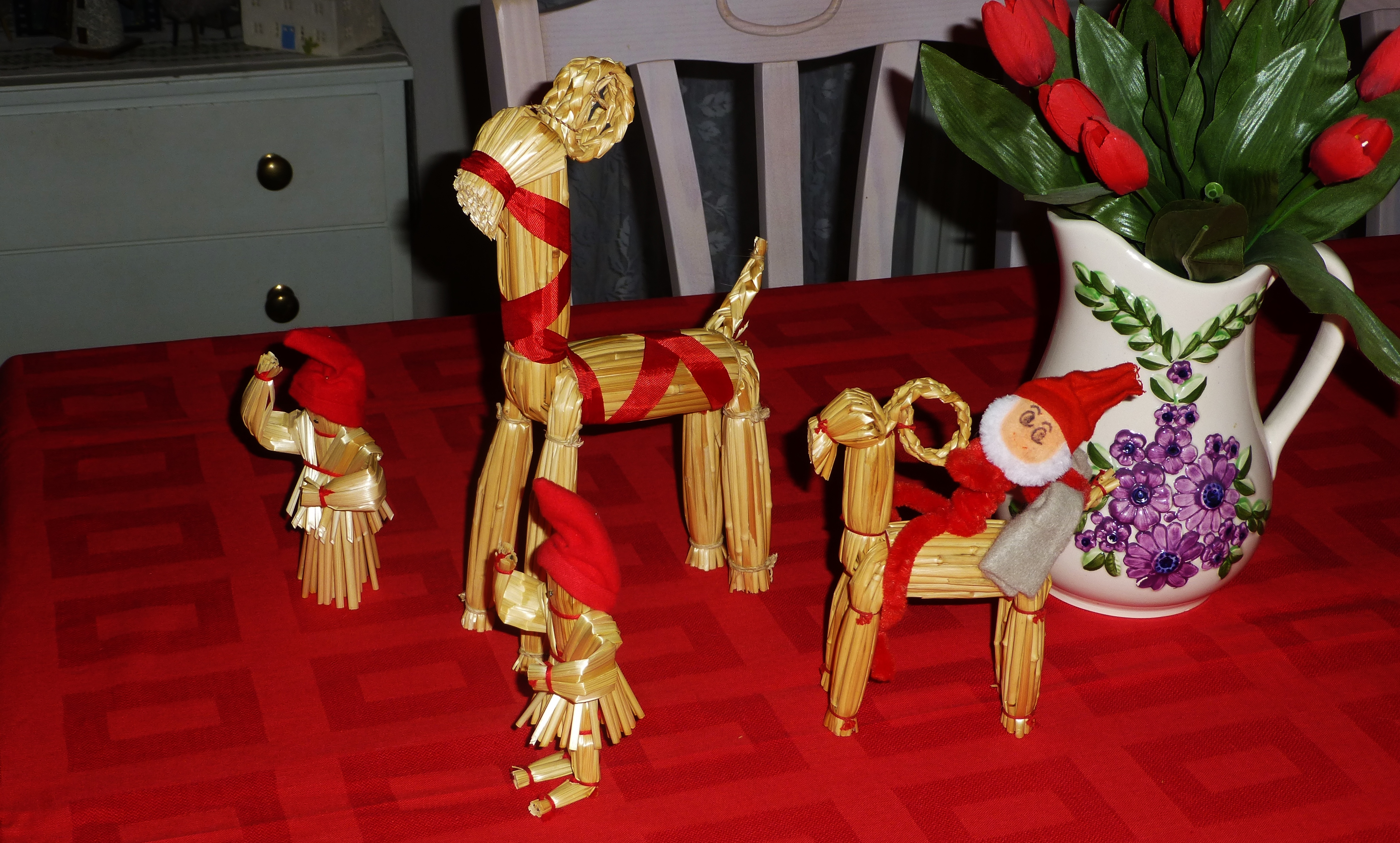
Swedish Yule goat ornaments

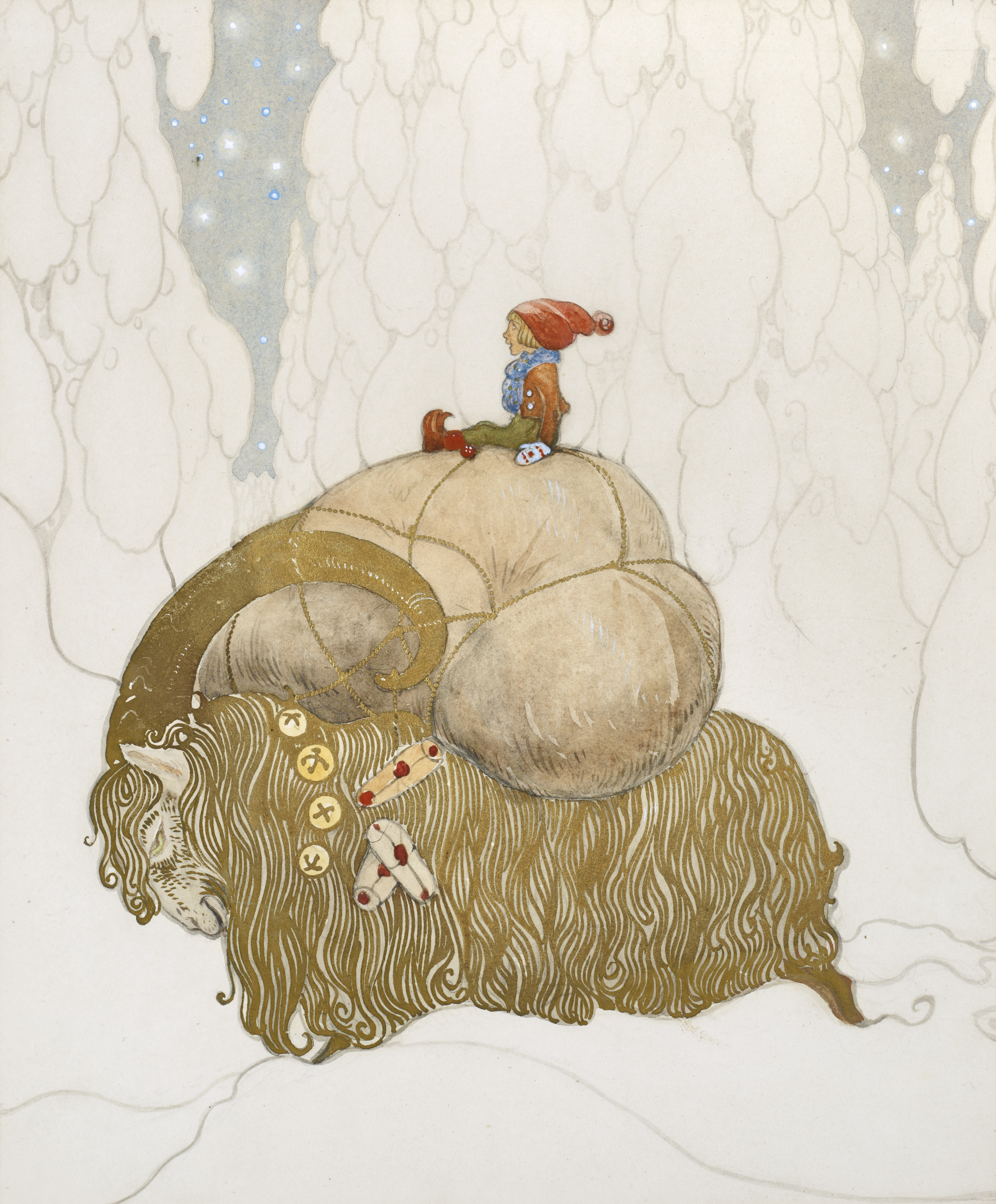
Julbocken by John Bauer (1912)

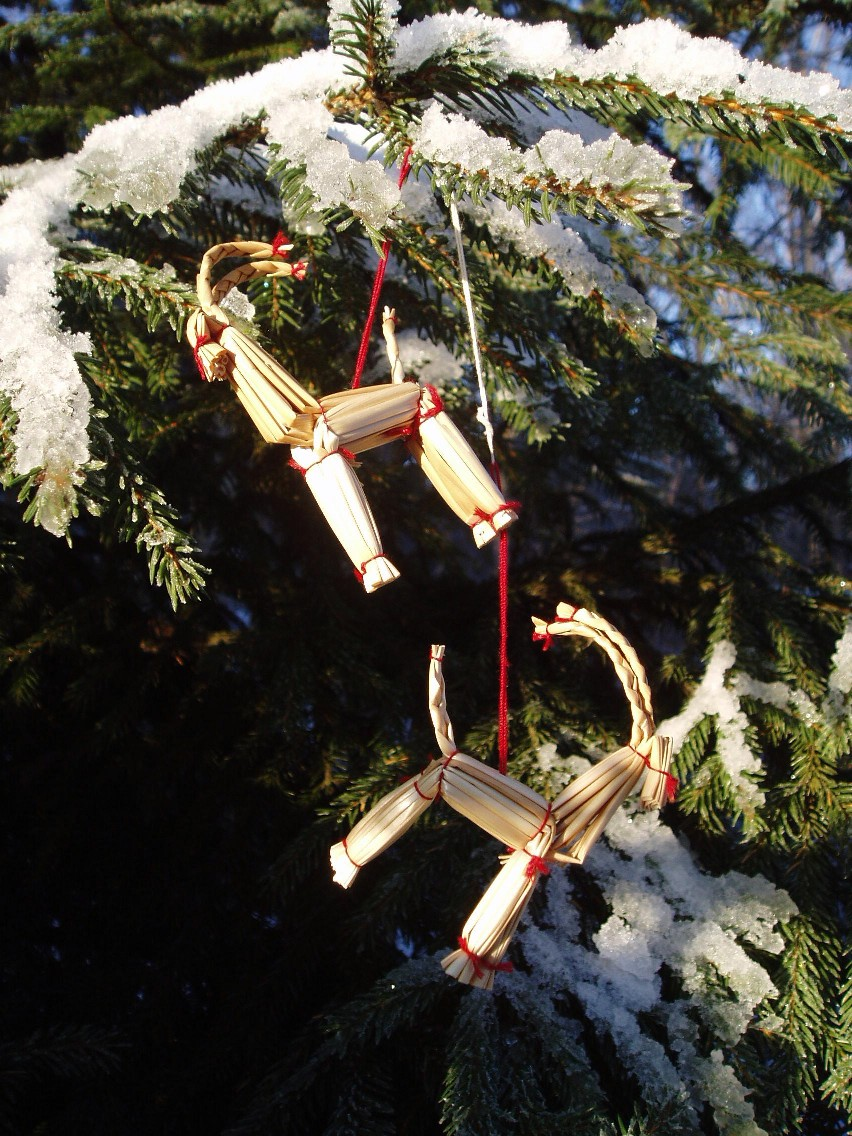
Modern Yule goat ornaments

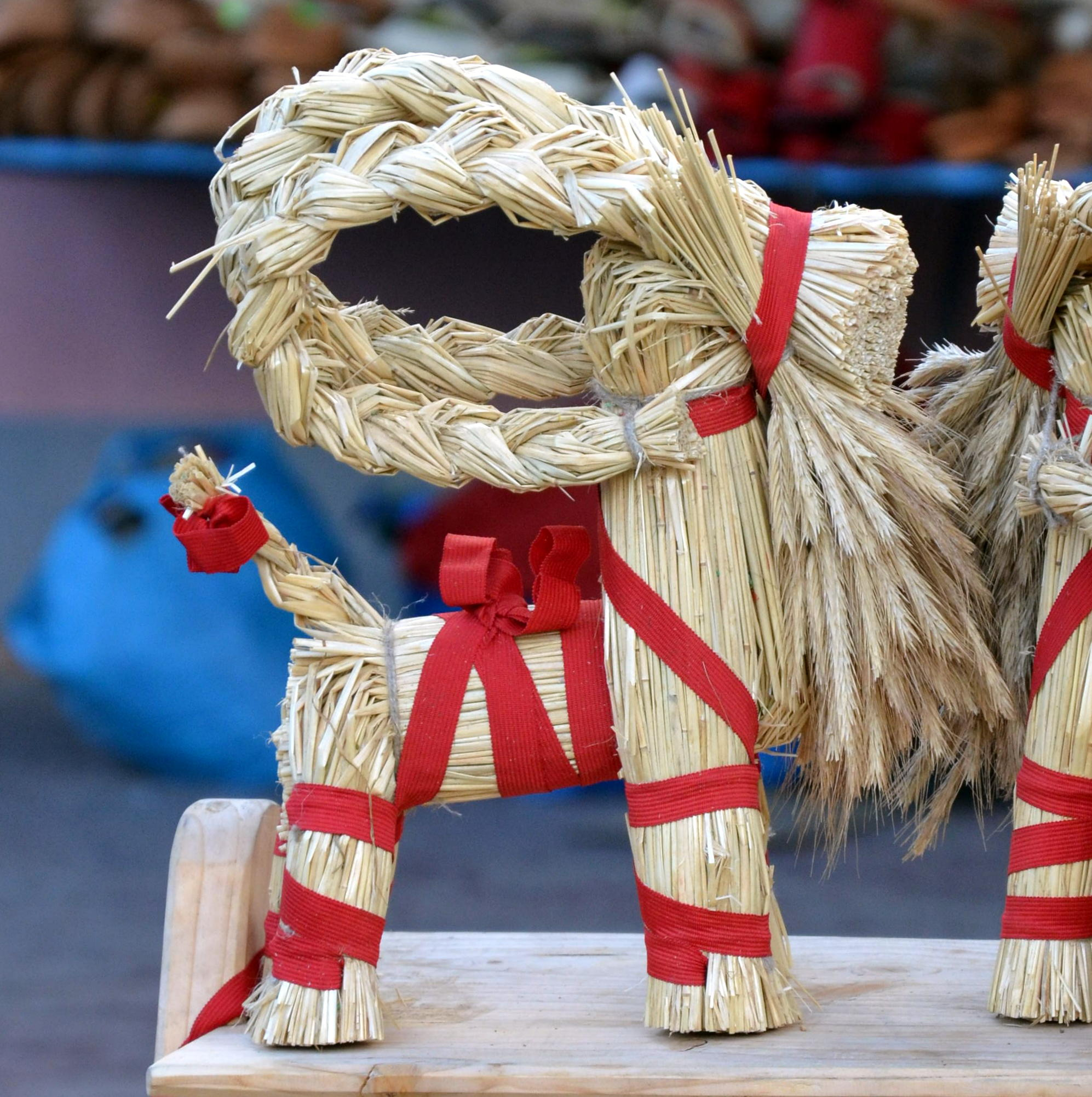
Straw Yule goat ornament from Poland

== Other sources ==
- Reade, Arthur (1919) Finland and the Finns (Dodd, Mead and Company)
- Rossel, Sven H.; Elbrönd-Bek, Bo (1996) Christmas in Scandinavia. (Lincoln: University of Nebraska Press) ISBN 0-8032-3907-6
- Berg, Knut Anders (1993) Julen i norsk og utenlandsk tradisjon (Oslo: Gyldendal) ISBN 8205217688
