= Nej se det snöar =

Song
- Language: Swedish
- Published: 1913
- Genre: children, Christmas
- Songwriter: Felix Körling

"Nej se det snöar" is a Swedish children's song with lyrics and music by Felix Körling. It was originally published in 1913 in Kisse-Misse-Måns och andra visor, entitled "Hurra för vintern!".

The song lyrics describe, from a child's perspective, the happiness and expectations during the first snowfall of winter.

== Recording ==
A recording with Peter Himmelstrand was released in 1978. Agnetha Fältskog and her daughter Linda Ulvaeus recorded the song on their 1981 Christmas album Nu tändas tusen juleljus.
