= Zacchaeus (song) =

Song

Song
- Genre: children's music
- Songwriter: Unknown

Zacchaeus, sometimes Zaccheus, or Zacchaeus Was a Wee Little Man, or other variations, is a traditional Christian children's song. The song recounts the story of Zacchaeus as reported in Luke 19:1–10. As the song tells of Zacchaeus's attempts to see Jesus by climbing a sycamore tree, there are a series of hand motions that accompany the song. The song is one of the more popular children's Bible songs, and has been featured on numerous Christian children's music collections.

== Lyrics ==
Zacchaeus was a wee little man,
And a wee little man was he.
He climbed up in a sycamore tree (pretend to climb a tree)
For the Lord he wanted to see.

And as the Savior passed that way
He looked up in the tree,
And he said, "Zacchaeus you come down, For I'm going to your house today!" (cup hands around mouth)
For I'm going to your house today! (clap to the beat)

Version used in England:
Zacchaeus was a very little man,
And a very little man was he.
He climbed up into a sycamore tree
For the Saviour he wanted to see.

And when the Saviour passed that way
He looked up in the tree,
And said, "Zacchaeus you come down,
For I'm coming to your house for tea!"
