= Lillebror =

Song by Gullan Bornemark

from the album Gumman i lådan
- Language: Swedish
- Published: 1964
- Songwriter: Gullan Bornemark

Lillebror is a children's song with lyrics and music by Gullan Bornemark, published in Hallå, hallå in 1964. Compared to the original version, the lyrics have been changed a little bit later. The inspiration to the lyrics came from the Gullan's daughter's Eva's baby brother Sven, who thought he could do anything.

== Publication ==
- Hallå, hallå, 1964
- Barnens svenska sångbok, 1999, under the lines "Sånger för småfolk".

== Recordings ==
Together with Malmö snurrorkester Gullan Bornemark recorded the song at the "Gumman i lådan" single together with her children Eva and Sven.
