= Linda Ulvaeus =

Swedish actress and singer (born 1973)

- Born: Linda Elin Ulvaeus; 23 February 1973 (age 53); Danderyd, Sweden
- Occupations: Actress; singer
- Partner: Jens Ekengren
- Children: 3
- Parents: Björn Ulvaeus (father); Agnetha Fältskog (mother)
- Musical career
- Instrument: Vocals
- Years active: 1980–present

Linda Elin Ulvaeus (born 23 February 1973) is a Swedish actress and singer. She is the first child of pop group ABBA members Agnetha Fältskog and Björn Ulvaeus.

== Early life ==
Ulvaeus is the first of two children of Agnetha Fältskog and Björn Ulvaeus, and was born in Danderyd Hospital on 23 February 1973. Her younger brother, Peter Christian Ulvaeus, was born on 4 December 1977.

== Career ==
Ulvaeus made her musical debut in 1981 at age 8, releasing the album she recorded alongside her mother the previous year, Nu tändas tusen juleljus ("Now a thousand Christmas candles are lit"). The album, which was produced by Fältskog alongside Michael B. Tretow, consisted of 18 traditional Christmas carols and children's songs in Swedish. Although the album had been recorded in November 1980 (when Ulvaeus was seven years old), it was not released until the following October.

She is the inspiration behind the song "Slipping Through My Fingers", written by her father and recorded by her parents' band ABBA.

Ulvaeus has since established herself as a stage and screen actress. Her acting debut came in the film Under solen (1998) in the role of Lena. She then appeared in the television series Labyrinten in 2000. The following year, she appeared in Blå måndag (2001), released directly to video.

Ulvaeus was a backing vocalist on her mother's 2004 comeback single, "When You Walk in the Room", which reached #11 in Sweden. Ulvaeus returned to the big screen in the role of Sofia in the film Meningen med alltihopa (2006). She later appeared in the television series Playa del Sol in 2007. Ulvaeus returned to film, playing Birgitta Ståle in Quick (2019).

== Filmography ==
=== Film ===
- Under solen (1998) as Lena
- Meningen med alltihopa (2006) as Sofia
- Quick (2019) as Birgitta Ståle

=== Television ===
- Labyrinten (2000) as Nurse
- Playa del Sol (2007) as Bikinitjejen

=== Video ===
- Blå måndag (2001) as Anki

== Discography ==
- 1981: Nu tändas tusen juleljus, with Agnetha Fältskog
