= Anders Palm =

Swedish literary scholar and linguist

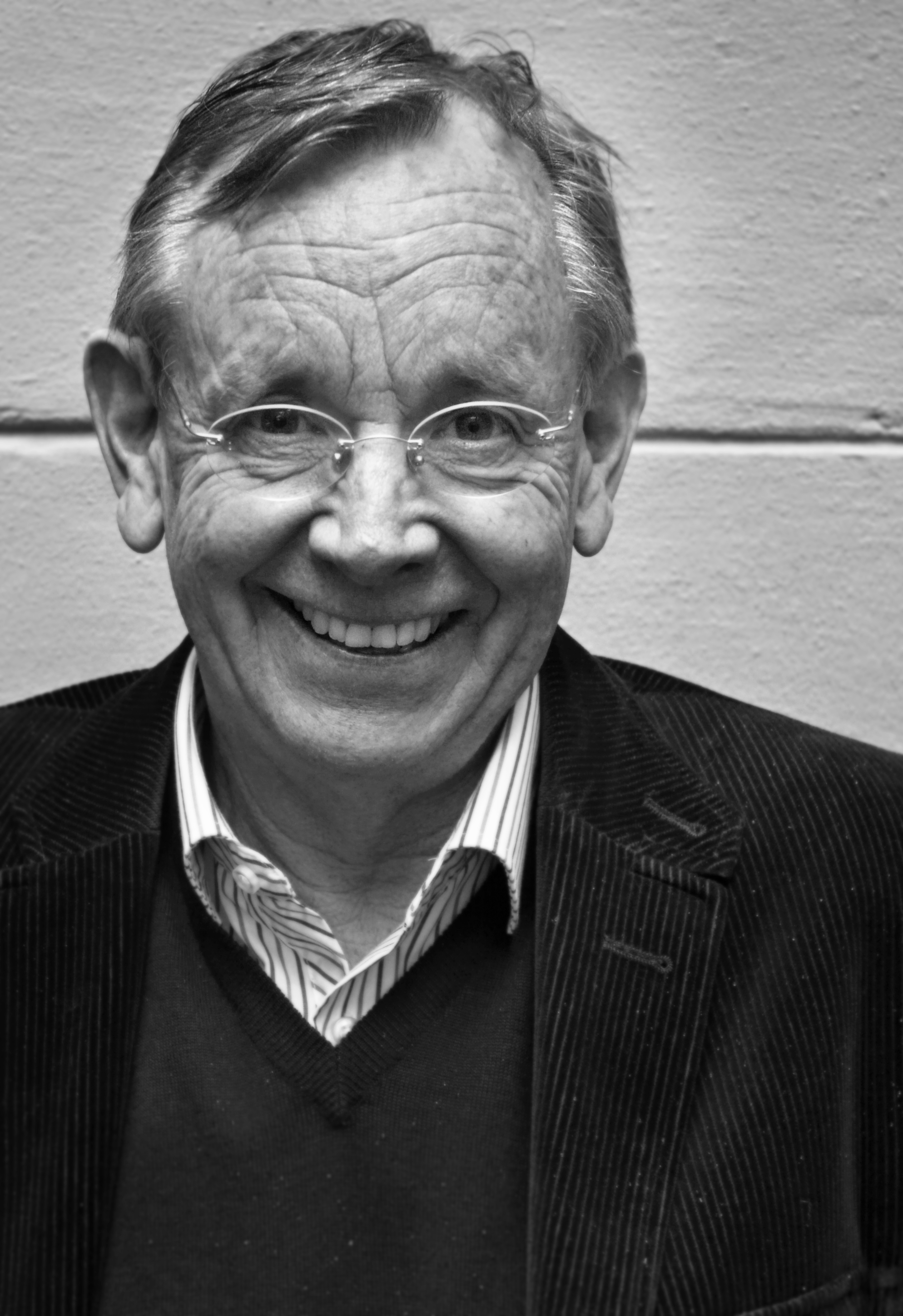
Anders Palm.

Anders Palm (born 6 July 1942 in Malmö) is a Swedish literary scholar and linguist. He is professor of history of literature at Lund University. In 2011 he received an honorary degree of medicine. Palm is the principal architect of "Medical Humanities" which today is included in the Swedish physician education, and means that the body is seen from a humanities perspective as from a normal medical perspective.

Palm has also written books, among them Den svenska sångboken ("The Swedish Song book") together with Johan Stenström.

Palm received the Dobloug Prize in 2003.
