= Jag tror på sommaren =

Single by Mats Olin
- A-side: "Jag tror på sommaren"
- B-side: "Gossen med gyllene äpplet"
- Label: Polar
- Songwriter: Stig Olin

"Jag tror på sommaren" is a summertime song written by Stig Olin and recorded by Mats Olin and released as a single in 1967. The Mats Olin recording became a Svensktoppen hit for 12 weeks between 21 May-6 August 1967.

The song was written for the final broadcasting of the 1966 Frukostklubben autumn season, on 21 December 1966 on request by producer Bertil Perrolf and performed by Stig Olin together with his wife Britta Holmberg and the children Mats and Lena. Mats performed the song in 1967 at Hylands hörna.
