= Johan Stenström =

Swedish literary scholar

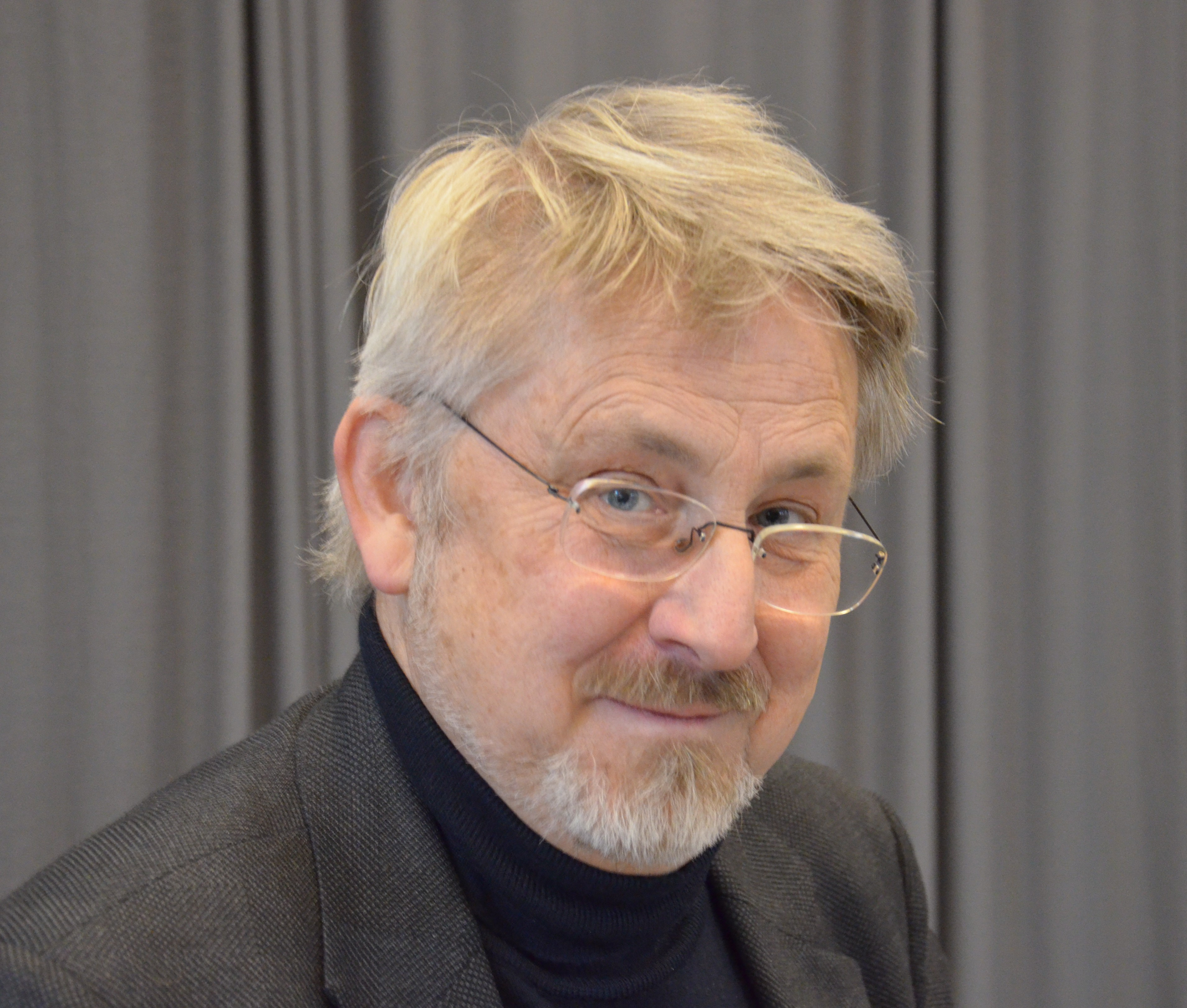
Johan Stenström Photographer: Bengt Oberger

Johan Gunnar Stenström (born 23 August 1951) is a Swedish literary scholar. He works at Lund University as docent (since 2002) and as professor (since 2009).

Stenström grew up in Helsingborg. He studied at Malmö Academy of Music and later history of literature at Lund University. He has written books, among them Den svenska sångboken (1997, together with Anders Palm) and Med fantasins eld - Ingemar Leckius och bilden (2002).
