= Lilla snigel =

Song
- Language: Swedish
- Published: 1957
- Genre: children

Lilla snigel is a traditional Swedish children's song for very young children, which is very simple to sing. The song is about a snail and was published in Våra visor, part 1, 1957.

== Publications ==
- Våra visor 1, 1957.
- Lek med toner, 1971 (angiven som "Lekvisa")
- Barnvisor och sånglekar till enkelt komp, 1984

== Recordings ==
An early recording was done in an arrangement by Plinque plonque musique, and released on a record in 1989. A Persian-language-version, "Halzun", was recorded by Simin Habibi in 1991.
