= Morsgrisar =

Morsgrisar is a song and singing game, of unknown origin (1999). The word "morsgris", referring to a "mother-bound and spoiled child" are dated back to 1613, which may show how old the song might be.

== Recordings ==
An early recording was done in 1901.
