= Gamblers (band) =

American rock band

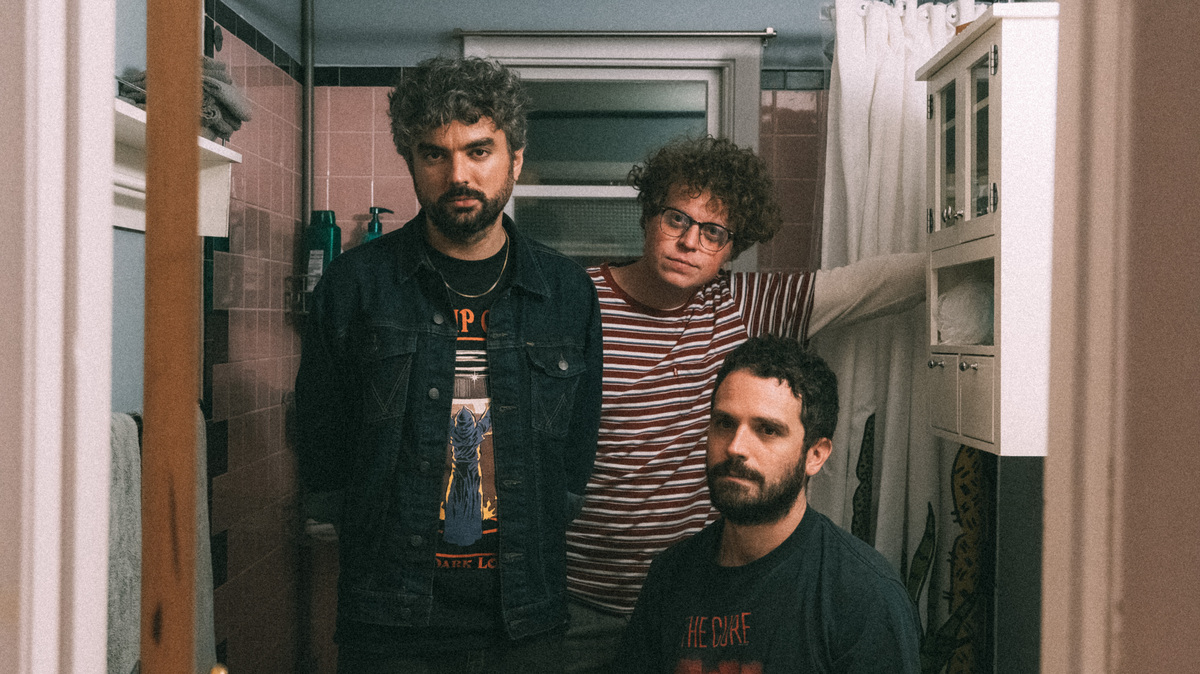
- Gamblers in 2021. Left to right: Michael McManus, James Usher, and Johnny Hoblin

Background information
- Origin: Long Island, New York, U.S.
- Genres: Indie rock, pop rock, alternative rock
- Years active: 2014-present
- Members: Michael McManus; James Usher; Johnny Hoblin

Gamblers is an American rock band formed in 2014 based in Long Island, New York. The band’s lineup consists of vocalist/guitarist and principal songwriter Michael McManus, lead guitarist James Usher, and drummer Johnny Hoblin. The band is known for rock and electronic music, particularly their application of hip hop-influenced beat construction to songwriting that encompasses elements of indie rock, indie electronic, and pop music.

== History ==
Formation and Early Years (2014-2017)

Gamblers was formed in 2014 by Michael McManus and Gary O’Keefe, who initially collaborated while touring with the Long Island-based band Vision Through Sound (later renamed Yankee Longstraw). McManus, who had developed an interest in hip hop production during his time at Hunter College, and O’Keefe created the band as an outlet for their musical ideas, gradually drawing in other musician friends, including Johnny Hoblin.

In 2016 and 2017, McManus collaborated with rapper/producer Heems of Das Racist/Swet Shop Boys on several projects, including a reworking of the U.S. National Anthem for Anthony Bourdain’s Parts Unknown and a track for the Viceland show Gaycation.

For their initial five years, Gamblers was primarily based in Williamsburg, Brooklyn. The band began recording their debut album "Small World" in Manhattan, at first in Harlem and later in Chelsea, before completing the project in Brooklyn.

Originally, Gamblers drew much of its inspiration from Long Island's complex social landscape, which McManus described as a place with a dark underbelly, including issues such as racism, organized crime, and the notorious Long Island serial killer case.

Corinthian Order EP and Pet Sematary/Monster Mash (2018-2019)

Gamblers released their debut EP, Corinthian Order, on September 7, 2018. In 2019, drummer Billy Rymer of The Dillinger Escape Plan joined the band, and they released Halloween-themed cover versions of Pet Sematary by the Ramones and Monster Mash by Bobby Pickett. These covers received airplay on SiriusXM's Underground Garage and WFUV’s The Alternate Side.

Small World (2020-2021)

In July 2020, Gamblers released the title track from their debut full-length album, Small World, which was officially released on September 25, 2020.

The album reached #12 on the Alternative Rock chart and was the 4th most added album on the NACC. The album was driven by the lead single We’re Bound To Be Together.

Small World features themes such as addiction, unhealthy relationships, existential angst, and serial murder, filtered through pop-inspired melodies and harmonies.

On New Year’s Eve 2020, Gamblers debuted a new lineup with a live-streamed performance at Patchogue Theatre for the Performing Arts in Patchogue, NY, marking their first performance with new lead guitarist James Usher, who was a former member of Edison Glass.

When We Exit (2022)

In 2022, Gamblers released the remix EP When We Exit, featuring collaborations with Mick Jenkins, Skyzoo, Lydia Luce, and NOVA ONE. The EP, which included the single Another Dose, highlighted the band's electronic, dance, and hip hop influences.

Pulverizer (2024-Present)

Gamblers released their second full-length album, Pulverizer, on March 29, 2024. The album continues to blend organic and synthetic elements, with a focus on themes of mortality and personal struggle. The title track, conceived during the global Covid-19 shutdown in March 2020, features a unique use of a vocoder, contributing to its Daft Punk-like sound.

"Pulverizer" follows the band's 2022 release, When We Exit, which included the widely streamed single "Another Dose" in collaboration with Mick Jenkins, accumulating over 12 million streams on Spotify.

== Band members ==
The band currently consists of vocalist/guitarist Michael McManus, lead guitarist James Usher and drummer Johnny Hoblin.

== Albums ==
=== Studio albums ===
- Small World (2020)
- Pulverizer (2024)

=== Extended plays ===
- When We Exit (2022)
- Pet Sematary/Monster Mash (2019)
- Corinthian Order (2018)
