= Sommaren är kort =

Single by Tomas Ledin

from the album Gränslös
- A-side: "Sommaren är kort"
- B-side: "Du tänder mig"
- Released: May 1982
- Genre: Pop
- Label: Polar Music
- Songwriter: Tomas Ledin

Tomas Ledin singles chronology
"Kärleken är som en studsande boll" (1982)	"Sommaren är kort" (1982)	"Never Again" (1982)

"Sommaren är kort" (In English: "Summer is short") is a song recorded by Swedish singer, songwriter and musician Tomas Ledin, which calls for seizing times when the sun is shining, as it can rain even in summertime, and time moves fast till the arrival of autumn again. The song was released at Ledins ninth album, Gränslös (1982). It was also recorded in English as "Taken by Surprise" (on his 10th album The Human Touch, 1982) and in Spanish as "Y Me Sorprendio". The Spanish-language version was the B-side for the single, Never Again (1983).

The single was released in May 1982 and peaked at 7th place on the Swedish singles chart. The song also stayed at Svensktoppen for four weeks from 23 May through 13 June 1982, climbing one step each week, from 10th to 7th place. and stayed at the last Svensktoppen chart before the 1982 disestablishment. In 2000, a pop version of the song titled "Sommaren är kort 2000" was released. It is also one of the title for the book Tusen svenska klassiker (2009).

Stefan Borsch recorded the song in 1982 for his album En liten fågel. The song was performed by E-Type at Så mycket bättre.

== Charts ==
Chart (1982)	Peak position
Finland (Suomen virallinen lista)	12
Sweden (Sverigetopplistan)	7
