= Hej tomtegubbar =

Christmas song

"Hej tomtegubbar" ("Hey, tomte-men") is a Swedish drinking song, also used as a children's round dance at Christmastime.

== Background ==
The tune was originally published in 1815, without lyrics. Parts of the lyrics exist in an 1833 record. It's also said that in 19th century Scania, the "Nigarepolskan" melody was used. Under that title, the song appeared in several compilations of singing games, starting in 1898.

In the 20th century, the use of the song as a drinking song begun.

== Publications ==
- Julens önskesångbok, 1997, under the lines "Traditionella julsånger", defined as "Swedish folksong"
- Barnens svenska sångbok, 1999, under the lines "Året runt".

== Lyrics ==
- In Swedish and English

== Recording ==
An early recording was done by Emma Meissner at Malmskillnadsgatan in Stockholm on 15 February 1910.
