= Wahlströms =

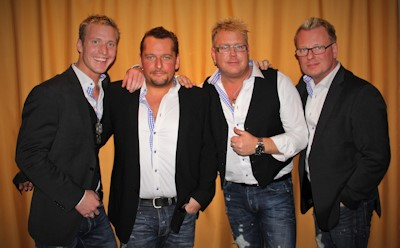
- Wahlströms in 2012

Background information
- Origin: Vadstena, Sweden
- Genres: Dansband music
- Years active: 1985-

Wahlströms was a dansband from Vadstena, Sweden, established in 1985.

In 1999, the band participated in the "Dansbandslåten" contest with the song "Blå blå ögon".

On 27 September 2011, it was announced that the band was to be disestablished following the last appearance at Brunnsparken in Örebro on 14 January 2012.

Wahlströms participated at Dansbandskampen in 2008.

== Members ==
- Anders Hildeskog - drums, vocals
- Tobias "Tobbe" Nyström - keyboard/piano, vocals
- Daniel Wahlström - vocals, guitar
- Henrik "Turbo" Wallrin - bass, vocals
- Chris Andersen - lead guitar, vocals (2008–2009)

== Discography ==
=== Albums ===
- Blå, blå ögon - 1999
- Min ängel (compilation album) - 1999
- Lovar & svär - 2001
- Allt jag vill ha - 2003
- Varannan vecka - 2006
- XX En samling - 2007
- Om du vore här - 2008
- Vårt älskade 80-tal - 2010
- Also appears on the charity compilation album "Jag ser en sol" - 1997

=== Singles ===
- Vi gör det ikväll - 1995
- Om hon bara visste - 1998
- Jag fick ditt namn och ditt nummer - 1999
- Min ängel - 2000
- Hela världen för mig - 2000
- Sofie - 2001
- Lovar & svär - 2001
- Utan att säga farväl - 2001
- Förlorad igen - 2002
- Allt jag vill ha - 2003
- Nyskild, lonely & ensam - 2005
- Varannan vecka - 2006

== Svensktoppen songs ==
- Jag fick ditt namn och ditt nummer (1999)
- Blå, blå ögon (1999-2000)
- Min ängel (2000)
- Hela världen för mig (2000)
- Sofie (2001)
- Lovar & svär (2001)
- Utan att säga farväl (2001)
