= Vi sätter oss i ringen =

Swedish Christian children's hymn

- Hymn
- Written: 1969
- Text: by Margareta Melin
- Language: Swedish
- Melody: by Lars Åke Lundberg
- Composed: 1970
- Published: 1977

"Vi sätter oss i ringen" is a well-known Swedish Christian children's hymn with 1969 lyrics by Margareta Melin and 1970 music by Lars Åke Lundberg. Written for Kyrkans barntimmar, the song received major coverage throughout Sweden in the 1970s, with the album Vi sätter oss i ringen. Ilon Wikland also drew a poster with children from different parts of Earth.

== Publication ==
- Smått å Gott, 1977
- Number 608:31 of Den svenska psalmboken 1986 under the lines "Barn och familj".
- Number 714 of Psalmer och Sånger 1987 under the lines "Tillsammans i världen".
- Number 635 of Segertoner 1988 under the lines "Tillsammans med barnen".
- Barnens svenska sångbok, 1999, under the lines "Hemma i världen".

== Recordings ==
An early recording was done Lars Åke Lundberg, and the record came out in 1972.
