= Lennart Hellsing =

Swedish children's book writer and poet

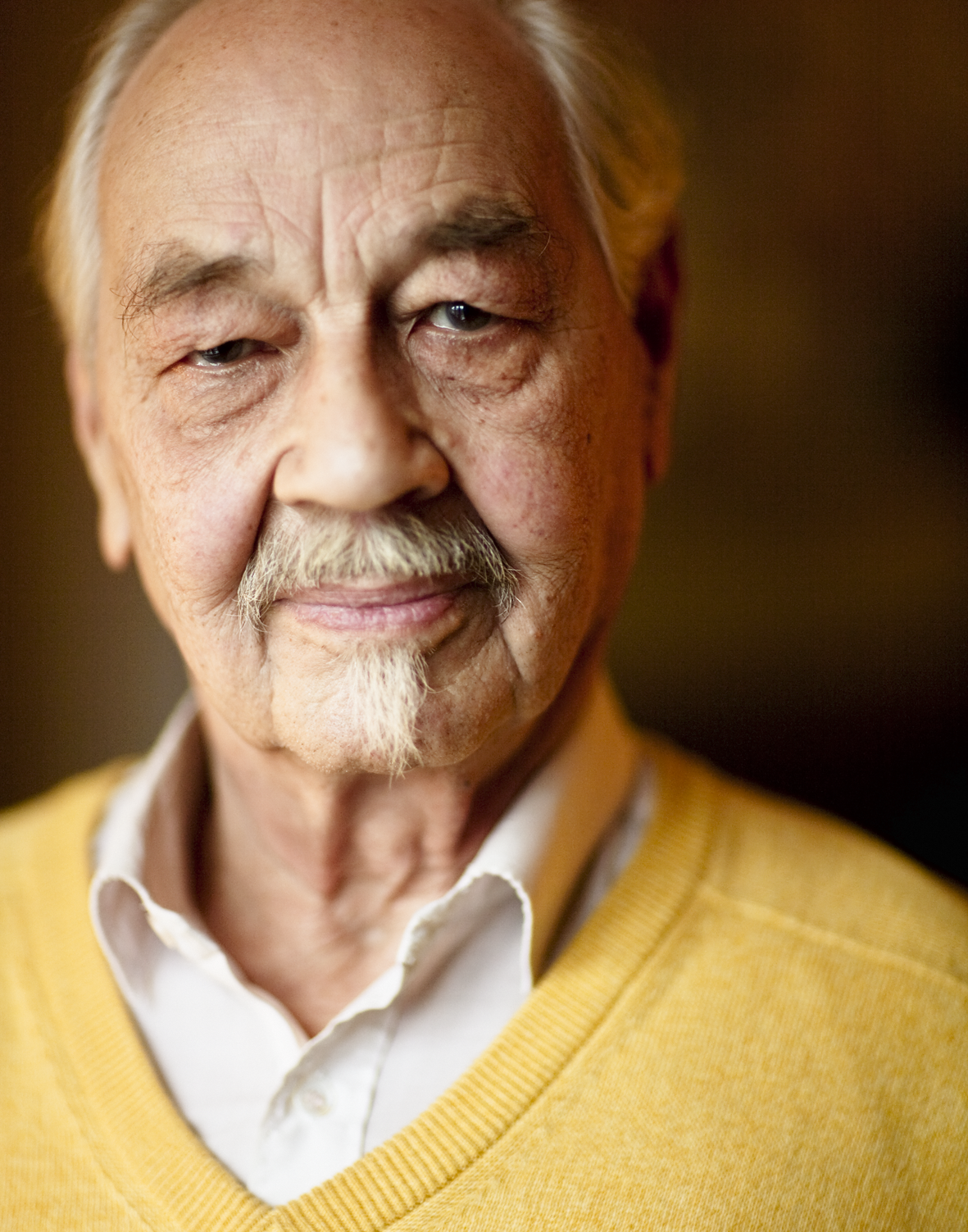
- Lennart Hellsing in June 2010
- Born: Paul Lennart Hellsing; 5 June 1919; Fagersta, Sweden
- Died: 25 November 2015 (aged 96); Stockholm, Sweden
- Occupations: Writer, Translator
- Spouse: Yvonne Lombard (m. 1953–2015)
- Writing career
- Language: Swedish
- Period: 1945-2015
- Website: hellsingland.se

Paul Lennart Hellsing (5 June 1919 – 25 November 2015) was a Swedish writer and translator. For his lasting contribution as a children's writer, Hellsing was a finalist in 2010 for the biennial, international Hans Christian Andersen Award.

== Biography ==
Born in Västanfors, Fagersta, Sweden, he was the son of the merchant Paul Hellsing and Sigrid Hellsing, née Rohloff, whose mother was from the West Indies. He was a prolific writer of children's literature, particularly known for his rhymes and word plays. He is considered an "outstanding poet" in the field of humour and nonsense writing. In 1987, he received the Grand Prize from Samfundet De Nio. Hellsing was married to actress Yvonne Lombard from 1953 until his death. Hellsing died at his home in Stockholm, Sweden, of pneumonia on the night of 25 November 2015 surrounded by his family, aged 96.
