= Bertil Hallin =

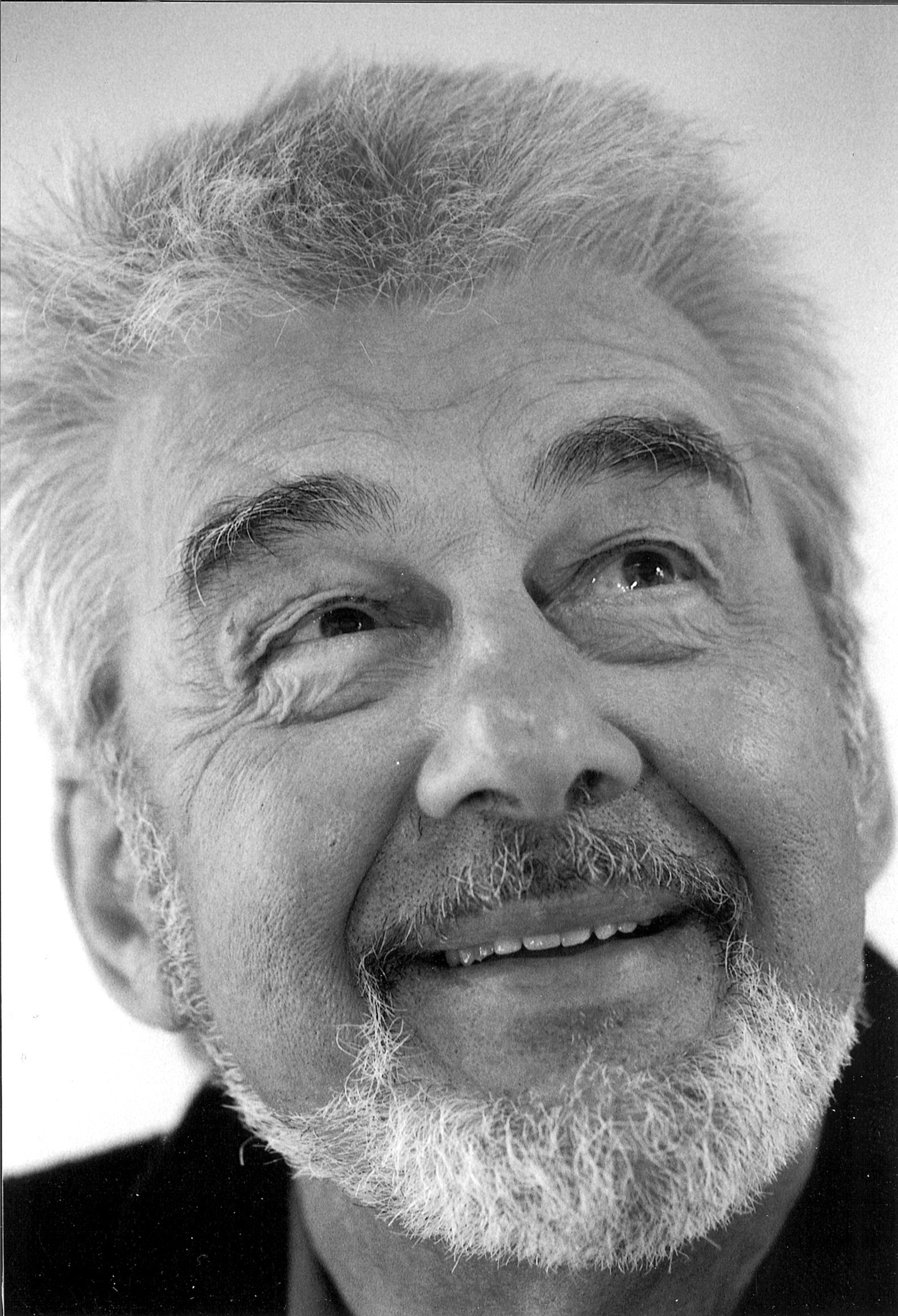

Background information
- Born: 30 December 1931 (age 93)
- Occupation(s): church musician, music teacher

Bertil Hallin (born 30 December 1931) is a Swedish church musician and music teacher, active in Malmö. He participated as an expert in the hymn commission of 1969, which led to the creation of the 1986 Swedish hymnal.
