= Gullan Bornemark =

Swedish musician, lyricist and composer (1927–2026)

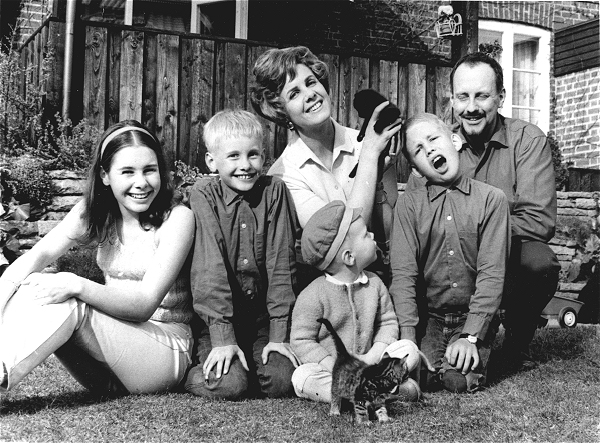
- Gullan Bornemark (middle) with her family in 1967

Background information
- Born: Elin Gunhild Bohlin; 28 November 1927; Härnösand, Sweden
- Died: 28 October 2026 (aged 98) Malmö, Sweden
- Genre: Children's songs
- Occupations: Musician, lyricist, composer, music teacher

Elin Gunhild "Gullan" Bornemark (née Bohlin; 28 November 1927 – 28 October 2026) was a Swedish musician, lyricist, composer, and between 1951 and 2001 a music teacher.

Bornemark was born in Härnösand, Sweden, on 28 November 1927. She wrote song lyrics, usually using already famous tunes, for Anita och Televinken with the ambition of teaching children how to behave in traffic. Bornemark died on 28 October 2026 in Malmö, at the age of 98.

== Songs ==
- "Gubben i lådan"
- "Gå i solen"
- "Herr Gårman"
- "Lillebror" (1964)
- "Min ponny"
- "Sudda sudda"
- "Är du vaken Lars?"
- "Skojiga valpen" (also known as "Valpen min")
