= Anita Lindblom =

Swedish actress and singer (1937–2020)

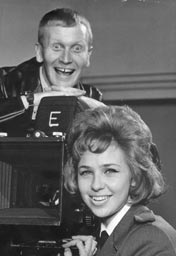
- Anita Lindblom and Thore Skogman in 1963
- Born: Anita Eleonora Lindblom; 14 December 1937; Gävle, Sweden
- Died: 6 September 2020 (aged 82); Mandelieu-la-Napoule, France
- Burial place: Skogskyrkogården
- Occupation: Actress
- Years active: 1957–1982

Anita Eleonora Lindblom (14 December 1937 – 6 September 2020) was a Swedish actress and singer. She appeared in thirteen films between 1957 and 1974. Lindblom also recorded music. Her single "Sånt är livet" (a cover of Roy Hamilton's "You Can Have Her") was a Norwegian No. 1 in 1962.

Lindblom died on 6 September 2020 in France, where she had been living since 1969.

== Discography ==
- Jul med tradition (1975)

== Selected filmography ==
- Mannequin in Red (1958)
- The Jazz Boy (1958)
- Sailors (1964)
- A Swedish Love Story (1970)
