= Britt G. Hallqvist =

Swedish hymnwriter, poet and translator

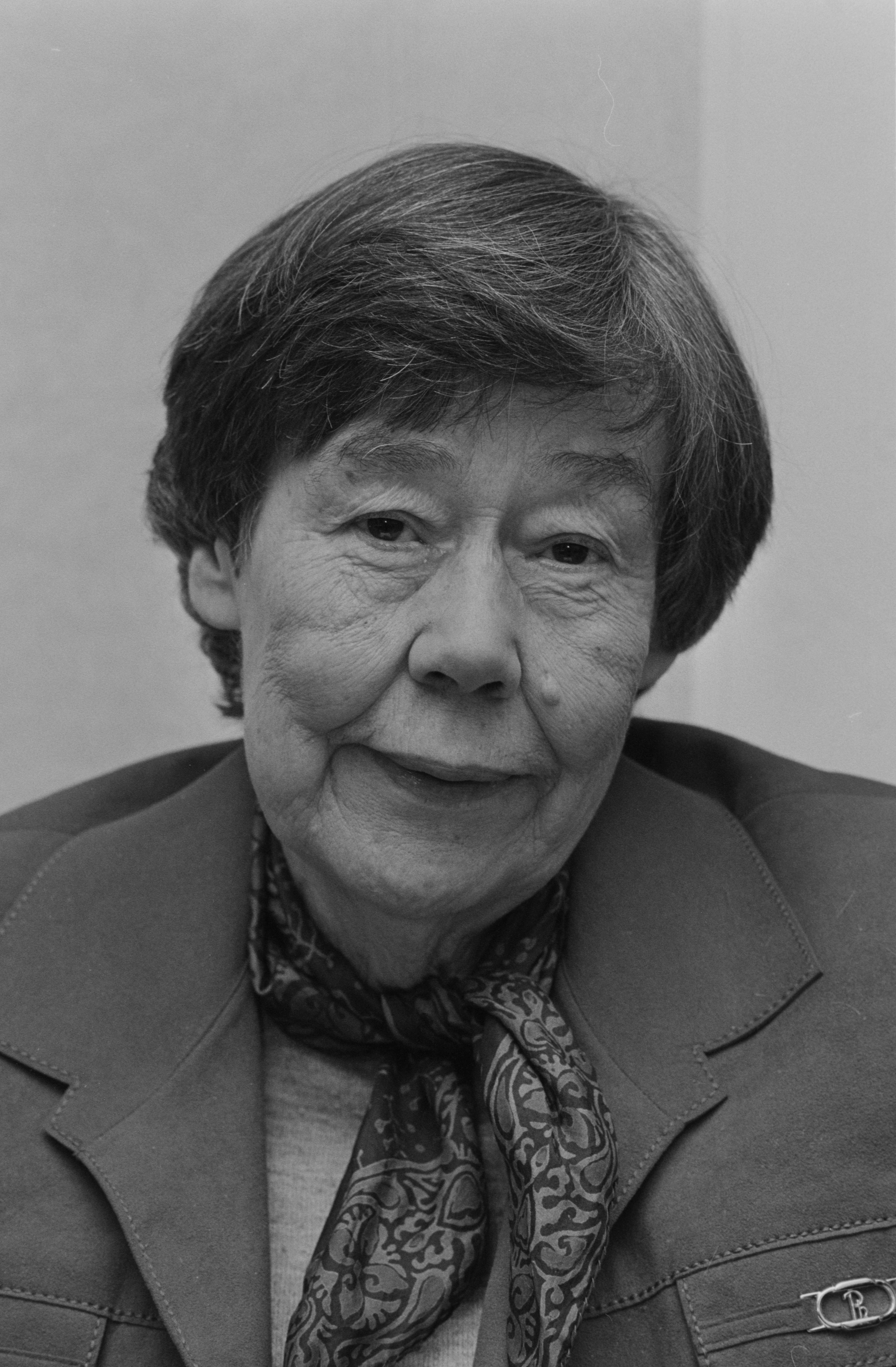
- Hallqvist in 1983
- Born: Britt G. Nyman; 14 February 1914
- Died: 20 March 1997 (aged 83)
- Occupations: hymnwriter, poet, translator
- Writing career
- Genres: children's songs, Christian hymns
- Notable awards: Nils Holgersson Plaque

Britt Gerda Hallqvist (née Nyman; 14 February 1914 in Umeå, Sweden – 20 March 1997 in Lund, Sweden) was a Swedish hymnwriter, poet, and translator. Her grandfather was the medical professor Salomon Eberhard Henschen and she was also the cousin of the neurology professor David H. Ingvar and his sister Cilla Ingvar.
