= Karusellen (song) =

Karusellen, also known as Jungfru skär or Jungfru skön, is a song often used as a singing game when dancing around the Christmas tree and the midsummer pole. The lyrics are centered on a carousel. The song was recorded (written down) at the Nääs sloy teacher's seminary around. When Sånglekar från Nääs by Otto Hellgren and Rurik Holm published in 1905 and 1915, the song was in the second volume. The song was also used as theme song for the Sveriges Radio programme Karusellen back in the early 1950s.

== Publications ==
- Julens önskesångbok, 1997, under the lines "Tjugondag Knut dansar julen ut", credited as "Swedish folksong"
- Barnens svenska sångbok, 1999, under the lines "Sång med lek och dans".
