= Hans-Olov Adami =

Swedish physician, academic and public health researcher

Hans-Olov Adami (born July 14, 1942) is a Swedish physician, academic and public health researcher. He established the largest epidemiologic and biostatistics research unit in Sweden, the Department of Medical Epidemiology and Biostatistics at the Karolinska Institutet. He is a former chair of the Department of Epidemiology at the Harvard School of Public Health in Boston, US.

== Biography ==
Adami was born in Solna, Sweden. He attended the Östra Real School in Stockholm, and then graduated from the secondary school in Skellefteå. He studied medicine at Uppsala University (M.D. in 1969), where he also defended his thesis in 1978 (surgery). In 1990, Adami became Professor of Cancer Epidemiology at Uppsala University, where he established a research group known as cancer epidemiology that became the newly established Department of Cancer Epidemiology at Uppsala University in 1994. In 1997 he and the entire department moved to Karolinska Institutet where he became Chair of a new department entitled Medical Epidemiology known as MEP. Beginning in 1999 he started to establish a biostatistics research facility and the department's name changed to Medical Epidemiology and Biostatistics (MEB) which grew to become the largest epidemiology and biostatistics research facility in the country. The department has since expanded to research areas outside of cancer epidemiology.

At the Harvard School of Public Health, he was adjunct full professor between 1992 and 2007, after which he became chair at the Department of Epidemiology at Harvard until 2011. He is currently Emeritus Professor at Karolinska Institutet and at Harvard but employed part-time in the Clinical Effectiveness Research Group at the University of Oslo. Adami has received numerous awards including the Jubilee Prize from the Swedish Society of Medicine, the Karolinska Institutet Distinguished Professor Award and the Karolinska Institutet Big Silver Medal. He is also Honorary Doctor of Medicine at the University of Athens and the University of Iceland. For many years Adami was a member of the Nobel Assembly of the Karolinska Institutet. He was the editor for The European Journal of Epidemiology 2004–08, and also served on the editorial board of The New England Journal of Medicine, PLoS Medicine and some 15 other scientific journals.

Adami was elected a member of the Royal Society of Sciences of Uppsala 1996, Royal Swedish Academy of Sciences 1997 and has served on the Governing Board of the European Academy of Cancer Sciences since it was established in 2009. In 2023, he was elected a member of the Academia Europaea. As of 2018, he has published over 900 scientific articles, one popular science book on prostate cancer and been the editor of a Textbook of Cancer Epidemiology with a third edition published in 2018 (Adami HO, Hunter D, Lagiou P, Mucci L, editors. Textbook of cancer epidemiology 3rded. New York: Oxford University Press; 2018). He lives with his wife Barbro in Väddö, Sweden.
