= Viktor Rydberg Gymnasium =

Coordinates: 59.345576°N 18.050044°E

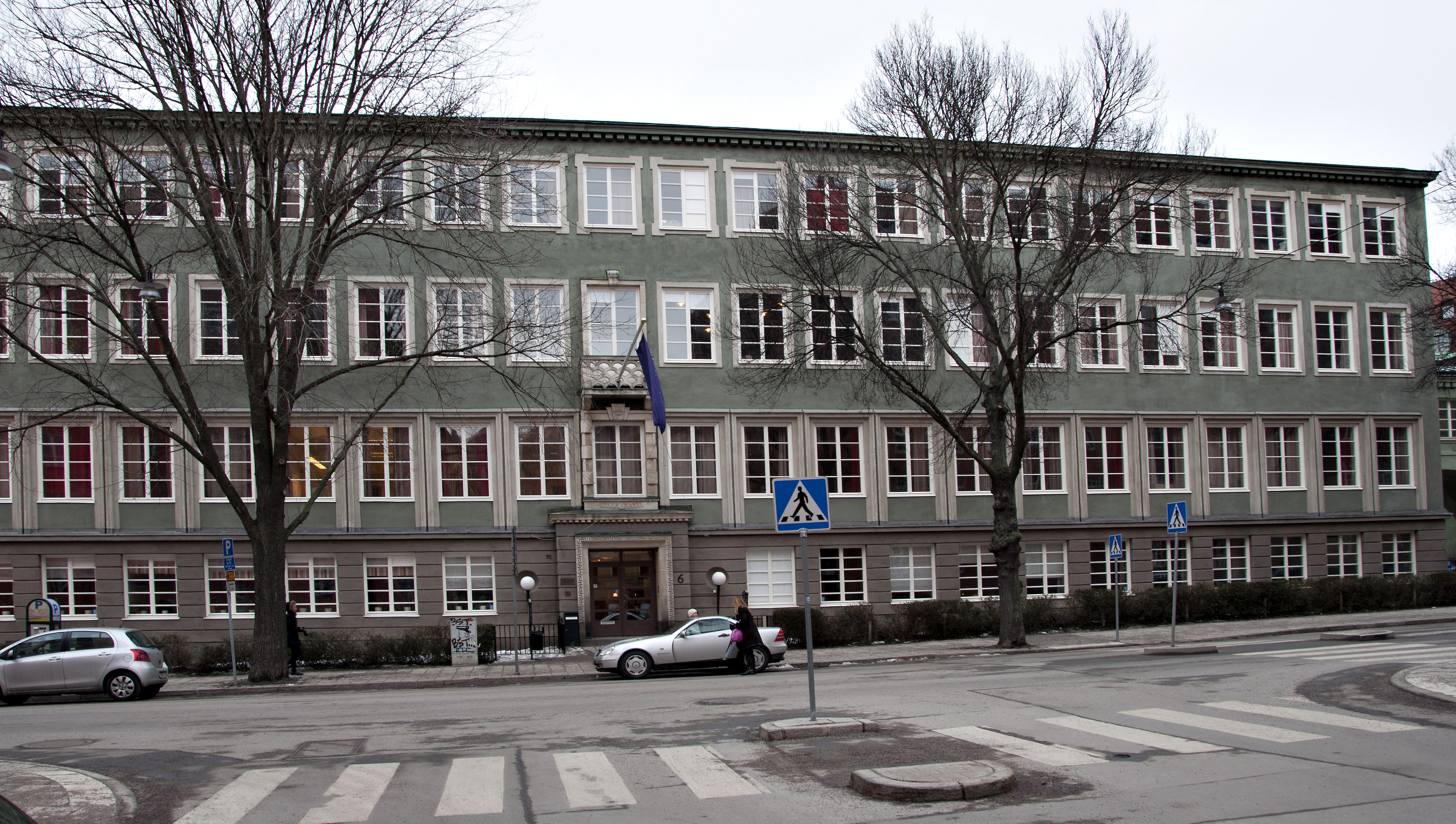

Location
- Frejgatan 30; Stockholm 113 49; Sweden

Information
- Type: Upper Secondary School, Free School
- Motto: Konst och vetenskap går hand i hand (Art and science go hand in hand)
- Founded: 1994
- Director: Amanda Hurst
- Principal: Anna Jaeger (VRGD), Kara Barker-Åström (VRGO), Anna-Karin Sundmark (VRGJ), Kajsa Parmell (VRGS),
- Staff: 360
- Language: Swedish, English
- Nickname: VRG
- Newspaper: The Rydberg Tribune, VRG Djursholm Tidning
- Communities served: VRG Odenplans Elevkår, VRG Djursholms Elevkår, VRG Jarlaplans Elevkår
- Website: www.vrskolor.se

Viktor Rydberg Gymnasium (VRG) is a group of four gymnasium (upper secondary schools) in Stockholm, Sweden named after the famous Swedish author Viktor Rydberg. The four upper secondary schools are VRG Djursholm, VRG Odenplan, VRG Jarlaplan and VRG Sundbyberg, run by the Viktor Rydberg Schools Foundation. The foundation also runs three secondary schools, Viktor Rydbergs samskola Djursholm, Viktor Rydbergs skola Vasastan, and Viktor Rydbergs skola Sundbyberg.

All four upper secondary schools are bilingual and about one fourth of the tuition is given in English by native speakers. This also means that course materials are both in Swedish and English.

== History ==
The first Viktor Rydberg gymnasium was established in 1994, soon after the 1992 "Free School Reform". The reform enabled private actors to run publicly funded schools, in a way similar to charter schools. Such a free school was started by the two parents Louise Westerberg and Louise Andersson in the halls of Djursholm samskola's eastern wing. After three years the number of applicants had risen so drastically that a new school was started at Odenplan in central Stockholm. In its first year, a large number of students and 580 teachers applied to the school. In 2003, a new school was started at Jarlaplan in order to provide an option for students who wanted to pursue artistic activities more fully.

== Notable alumni ==
- Daniel Adams-Ray
- Oskar Linnros

== See also ==
- Djursholms samskola
- Education in Sweden
- Enskilda Gymnasiet
- Kungsholmens Gymnasium
- Norra Real
- Östra Real
- Södra Latin
