= Strindlund =

Strindlund is a Swedish surname. Notable people with the surname include:

- Anna-Lena Strindlund (born 1971), Swedish actress
- Gerhard Strindlund (1890–1957), Swedish politician
- Marit Strindlund (born 1972), Swedish conductor
- Pelle Strindlund (born 1971), Swedish writer and animal rights advocate
