= Kungsholmens gymnasium =

Location
- Hantverkargatan 67-69; Stockholm, 112 31; Sweden
- Coordinates: 59°19′48″N 18°02′01″E

Information
- Type: Upper secondary school Public
- Established: 1902
- Rector: Jenny Rångeby
- Colour: Black
- Newspaper: KZINE
- Website: kungsholmensgymnasium.stockholm.se (in Swedish)

Kungsholmens gymnasium is an upper secondary school (Swedish: gymnasium) located on the island of Kungsholmen in Stockholm, Sweden. The school is divided into a Swedish Section, an English-speaking International Section, and a Music Section which uses the name Stockholms Musikgymnasium. Kungsholmens Gymnasium is a popular school in Stockholm with high application rates and some of the highest minimum admission requirements within the Stockholm County.

== History ==
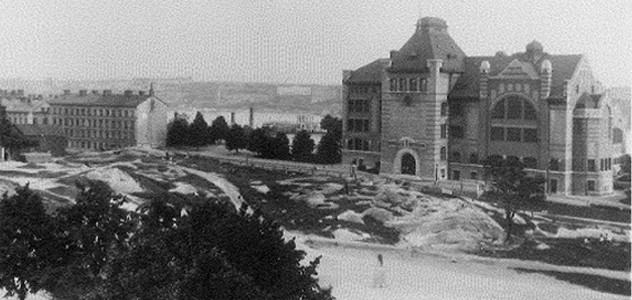
The newly completed school building in 1907.

King Gustaf V inaugurates the school building in 1908.

The schooling reforms of 1842 (Swedish: folkskolestadga) led to a dramatic increase in the number of children eligible for schooling. The city also experienced very high population growth during the latter half of the 19th century. Because of this, Stockholm's schooling facilities could no longer accommodate the increasing number of students. To solve these issues it was proposed to establish new schools, one of which would be located in Kungsholmen.

The school was established in 1902 (Note: A previous school in the area was established in 1672 as Ulrica Eleonora, and commonly referred to as Kungsholmens skola. It eventually changed its name to Kungsholms lägre elementarläroverk, ultimately closing down in 1868. Although this school is sometimes seen as a predecessor to Kungsholmens gymnasium, there are over three decades between the existence of these two schools.) as Kungsholmens Allmänna Läroverk (English: Kungsholmen's Grammar School), consisting of five grades. The school hired temporary accommodation on S:t Eriksgatan while a dedicated building was being designed and built. After further schooling reforms, it became a realskola (with an additional sixth grade) under the new name Kungsholmens realskola. The school moved into the newly constructed building on Hantverkargatan during the Autumn of 1907. It was not until 1 February 1908 that the building was formally inaugurated, in the presence of King Gustaf V and other members of the royal family. (Note: Other members of the royal family attending the inauguration were: Crown Prince Gustaf Adolf and his consort Princess Margaret, Prince Carl and his consort Princess Ingeborg, as well as Prince Eugen. In addition, the aula was filled with representatives from the Stockholm city council (Swedish: stadsfullmäktige), scientists, and industrialists.) The school has remained in this building since.

Several specialised education programmes have moved in and out of Kungsholmens gymnasium throughout its history. In 1984, Stockholms Musikgymnasium (English: Stockholm Music School) moved into the same building, maintaining a certain level of autonomy as a separate section. The International Section originally existed in Norra Real (an upper-secondary school in Stockholm), but it was transferred to Kungsholmens gymnasium in 1987. The Stockholm City Education Department (Swedish: Stockholms stad Utbildningsförvaltningen) announced in October 2014 that the IB Diploma Programme at the school would be moved to the International School of the Stockholm Region (ISSR). This decision was confirmed in November 2014 despite protest actions from students and staff at the school, with new IB Diploma students entering the ISSR in the Autumn 2015 term.

== Building ==
The current building's location was already considered an appropriate place to build a new school as early as 1902, with several building proposals being made. When these proposals were deemed unacceptable, a request was made to the three architects Erik Josephson, Ragnar Östberg, and Axel Anderberg to draft new building proposals. While none of the new proposals were deemed acceptable, the one by Axel Anderberg was considered the most viable for further development. Georg Ringström was tasked with developing and drafting the new proposals. One of these, a four-story design, was accepted and awarded a grant of 882 000 Swedish krona to be built.

Building preparations began in 1904, and while the building was originally meant to be completed in 1906, a series of lockouts delayed the completion of the building. The building was in fact still not completed in 1907 when classes began to take place, and it was not until 1 February 1908 that it could be inaugurated.

The building is distinct in style from other school buildings of the time which featured predominantly red brickwork (like that found in the building of Södra Latin). The building's façade has an alternating light red brick and white plaster design. The main entrance portal is inspired by fellow architect Ferdinand Boberg. The building features big corridor and stairwell spaces, as well as a two-storey aula.

The building has been renovated several times. During the latest renovation (1993–1994), the old paintwork on the ceiling of the school's aula was restored. Simultaneously the building was further expanded towards the east, and underground parking spaces built under the school replacing the old bomb shelters.

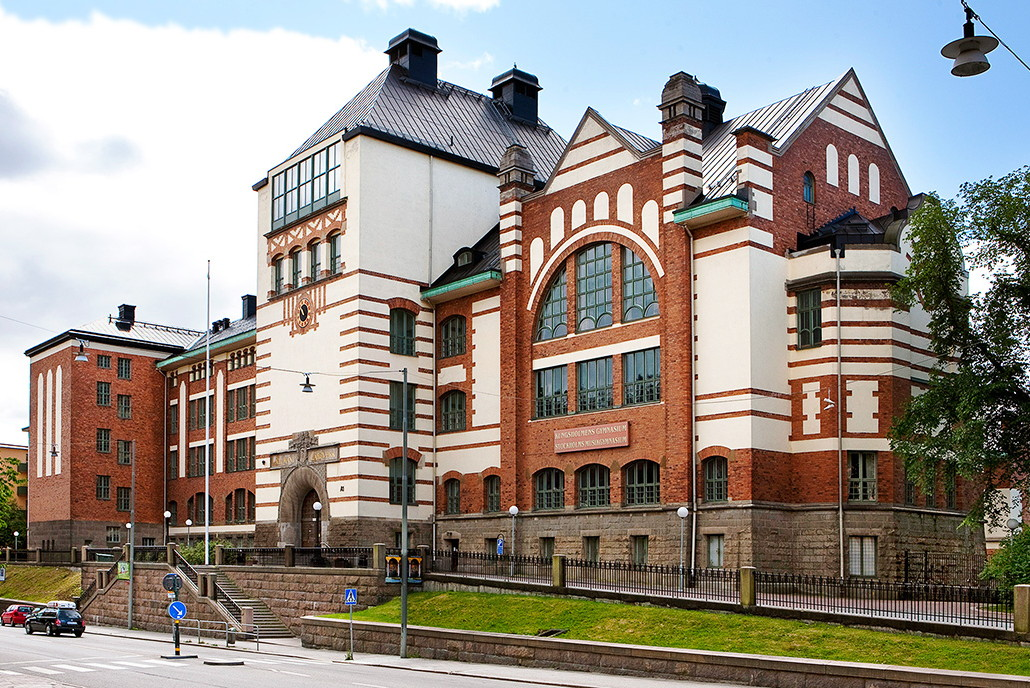
Front of the building.

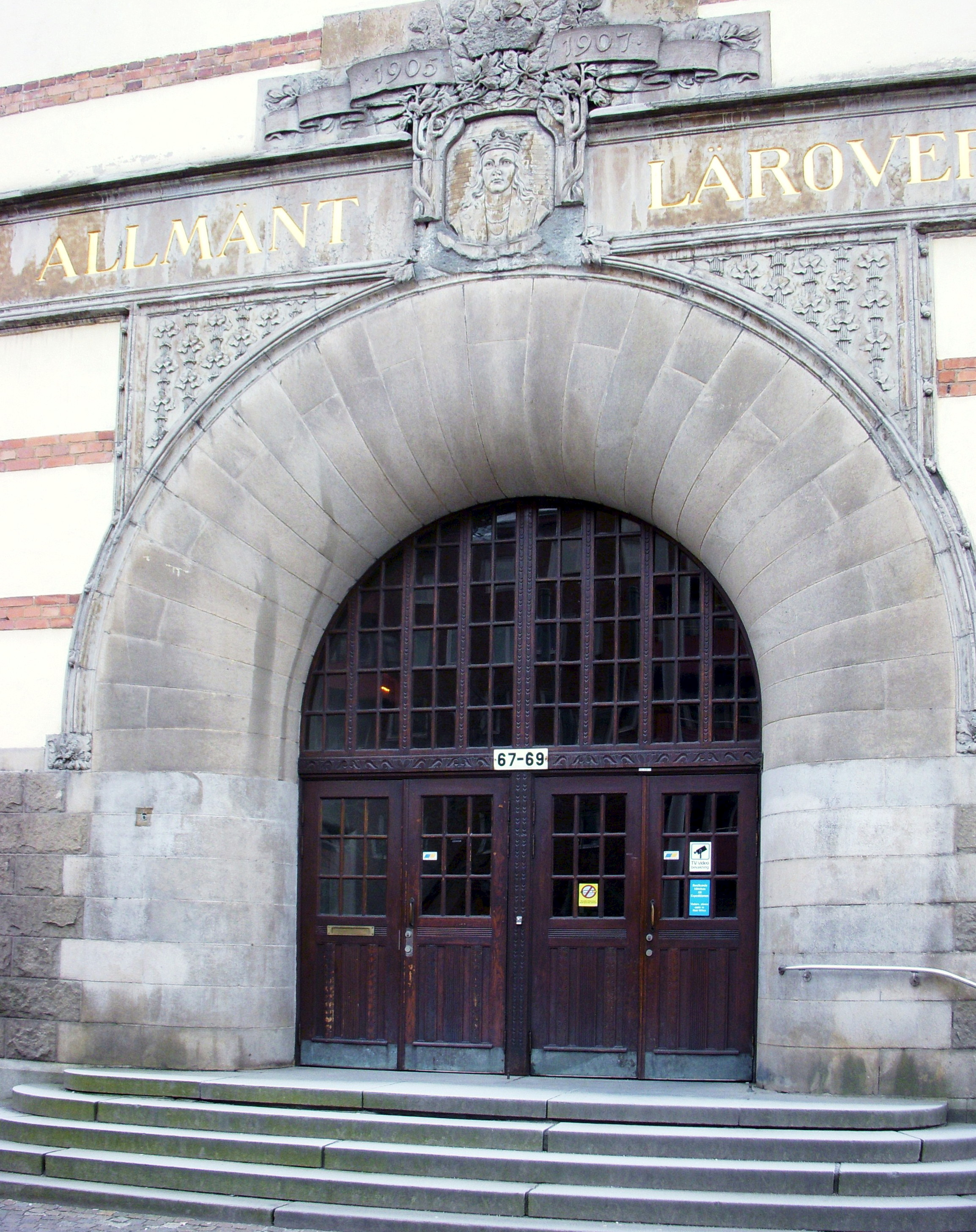
Main entrance portal, reading General Secondary School in Swedish.

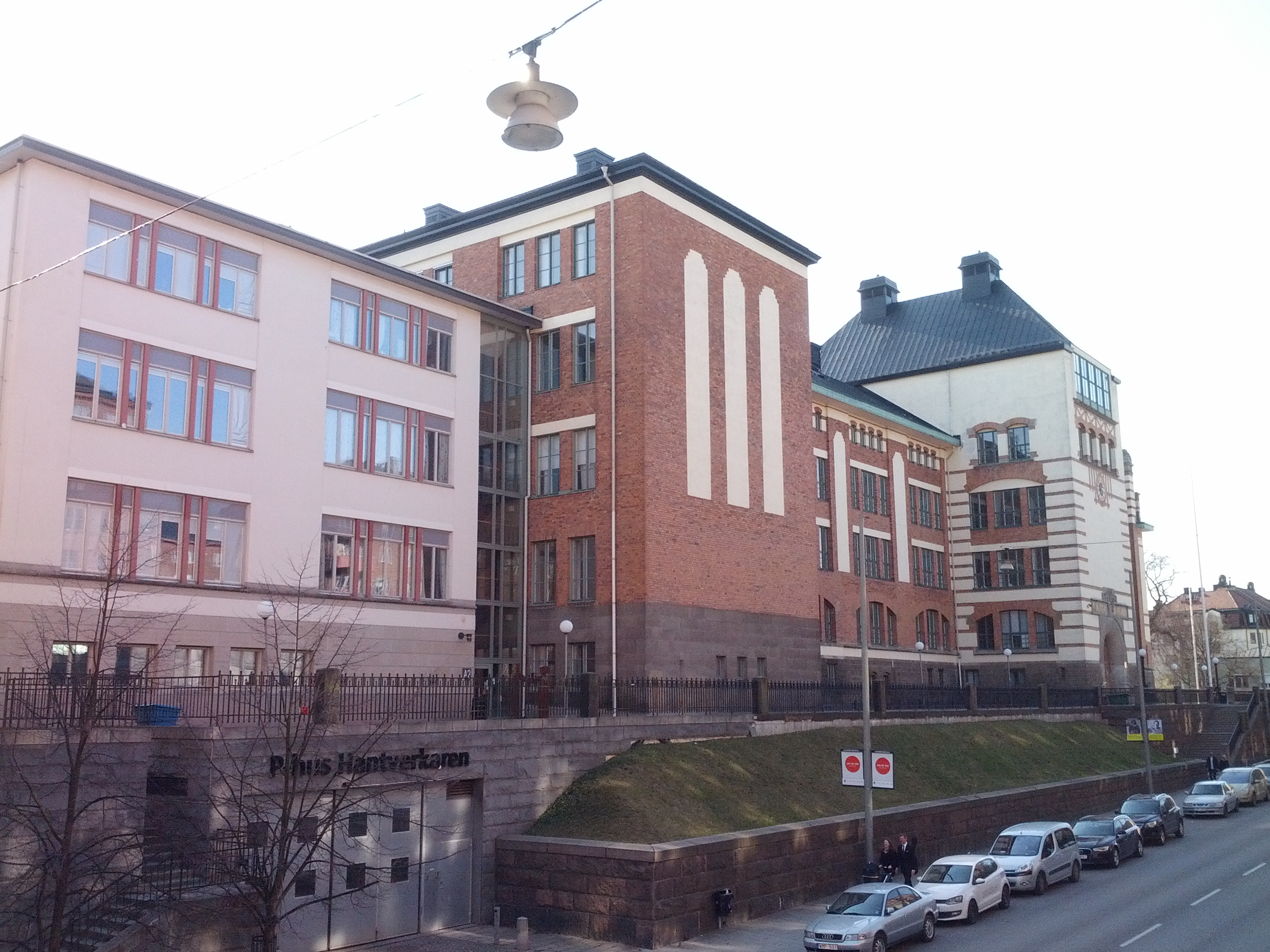
Building expansion to the east, with underground parking spaces below.

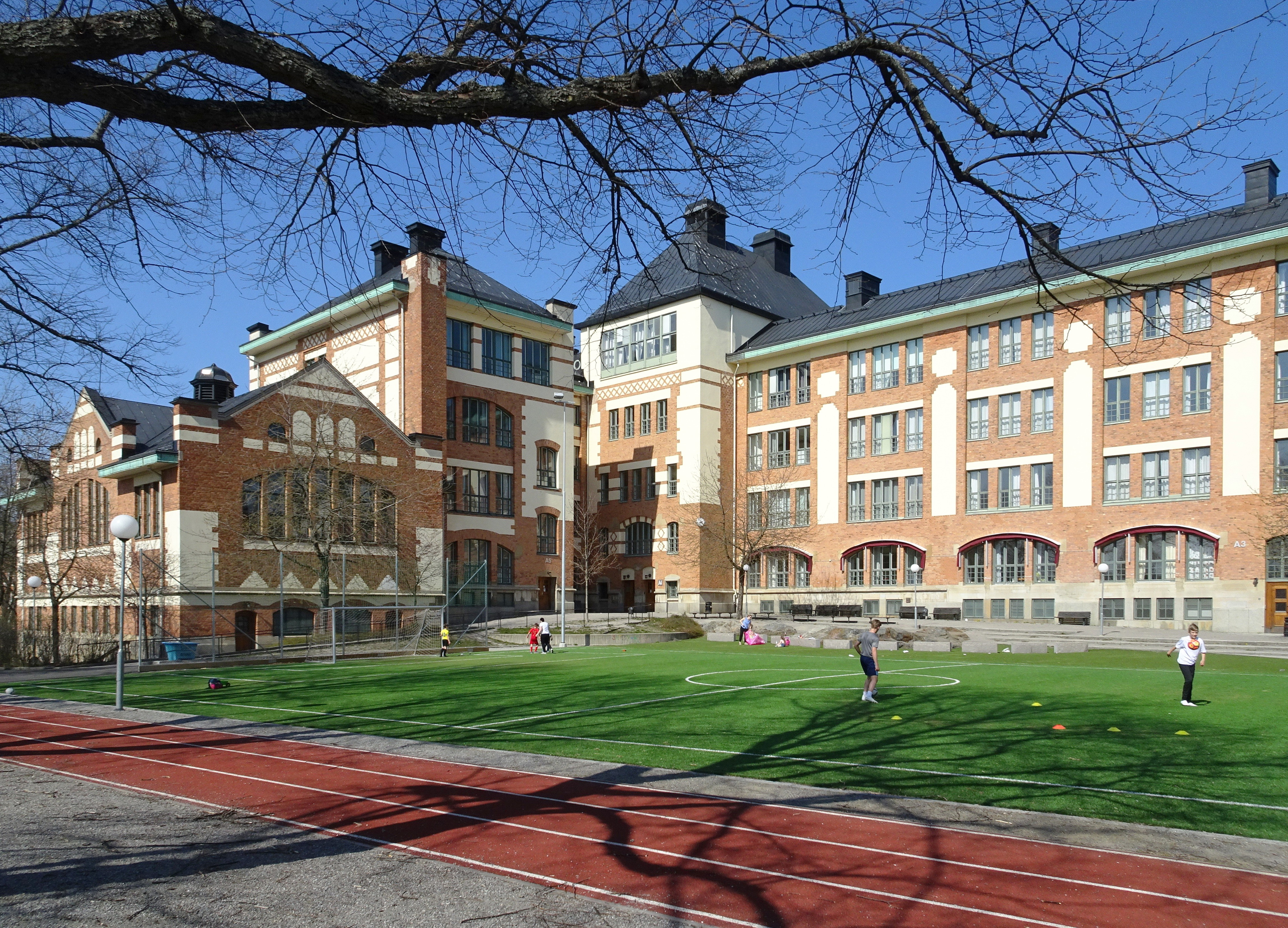
Rear of the school building.

== Study programmes ==
Kungsholmens gymnasium is organized into three sections: a Swedish Section, an International Section, and a Music Section under the name Stockholms Musikgymnasium.

=== Swedish and International Sections ===
The Swedish Section offers the Social Science programme (Swedish: samhällsvetenskapliga programmet), the Natural Science programme (Swedish: naturvetenskapliga programmet), and a Humanities programme (Swedish: humanistiska programmet) which specialises in languages. The International Section offers English-speaking versions of the Social Science and Natural Science programmes. An IB Diploma programme also exists within the International section, but it does not accept new students since 2015.

The minimum admission requirements to enter these programmes are consistently some of the highest in the Stockholm County, making them highly competitive. In 2012, the admission points to the Natural Science programme in the International Section was 315 out of 320, one of the highest admission points requirement in Stockholm, and 310 points in the Natural Science programme in the Swedish Section.

=== Music Section ===
The Music Section offers modified Natural and Social Science programmes that include advanced choral courses. Admission to this programme is also highly competitive and accepts students based on a combination of grade point average, singing auditions and tests in music theory. The school's choirs occasionally compete internationally, normally with good results, such as in the 14th International Choir Competition in Budapest, Hungary in 2013 where a class choir directed by Bengt Ollén participated in three categories (Mixed choirs, Male choirs and Female choirs) and won gold in all, plus the Grand Prix for the entire competition. The result was identical the year after with another choir directed by Helene Stureborg in the 2014 12th International Choir Competition & Festival in Bad Ischl, Austria.

== Extracurricular activities ==
=== Student government ===
The student body of Kungsholmens Gymnasium is represented by the Kungsholmens Gymnasium Student Union (Swedish: Kungsholmens Gymnasiums Elevkår). It is divided into a board, an operational management and six branch committees: the Social Committee (Swedish: Sociala Utskottet), the Graduation Committee (Swedish: Studentutskottet), the Sports Committee (Swedish: Idrottsutskottet), the Marketing Committee (Swedish: Marknadsföringsutskottet), the Advocacy Committee (Swedish: Påverkansutskottet) and the Project Committee (Swedish: Projektutskottet). The Social Committee organizes and holds social student events throughout the academic year, with the aim of creating a fun student experience. The Advocacy Committee works on student democracy matters, enhancing student engagement and student influence on the school as a whole. Finally, the Project staff help organize events and student-initiated projects, such as raising money for refugees. 2018 the Union together with KGIF and Östra Real arranged one of the largest indoor American football games in Europe.

=== Student societies and publications ===
==== KZINE ====
KZINE is a student-run publication based primarily on their web newspaper, but paper publications have also been made. Since May 2014, KZINE has also begun to publish internet radio programmes in the form of podcasts. KZINE developed from the website Kungsholmen Unofficial Webpage (KIWS), an internet site created in 1998 by a student. In 1999 the first edition of the web-based magazine KZINE.com was published. In 2008 KZINE won the youth journalism prize Lilla journalistpriset for best web-based student publication (in the upper-secondary school class). In December 2013 a KZINE article about political censorship of a school class photograph attracted wider media attention in the news publications Expressen and Nyheter24, among others. In November 2018, KZINE was nominated for the Swedish School news paper of the year by Sveriges Tidskrifter.

==== Zambia Group ====
A partnership has existed since 1999 between Kungsholmens gymnasium and three schools in Zambia (Hillcrest Technical High School in Livingstone, Chinika High School in Lusaka, and Monze Boarding High School in Monze). The Zambia Group raises funds to support these schools and their students. It also promotes cultural exchanges, and organizes expeditions to visit these schools to work on various projects. Anders Jonsson and Eileen Ingulfson, the two teachers who pioneered the partnership, won the 2008 FUF prize in global development from the Swedish Development Forum (Swedish: Föreningen för Utvecklingsfrågor) for their work on the Zambia Group. They have their own website which can be found here.

==== Kungsholmens Debating Society ====
Founded in 2010, Kungsholmens Debating Society is the debating association at Kungsholmen. Activities include organising large public debates, meetings to improve upon member's rhetoric and hosting the annual debate tournament KG Cup. KDS debate teams have been successful on the competitive scene, winning the Swedish Schools Debating Championships in 2018 as well as reaching the elimination rounds of major international debating tournaments such as the Nordic Schools Debating Championships and Heart of Europe. KDS regularly has members selected to the Sweden national team representing Sweden at the World Schools Debating Championships.

== Notable alumni ==
Several prominent Swedish people have received their schooling at Kungsholmens gymnasium, including cultural personalities. These include:

- Arnthor Birgisson, music producer.
- Alexandra Dahlström, actress and director.
- Kajsa Ekis Ekman, author.
- Bengt Feldreich, journalist,
- Kåre Hedebrandt, actor.
- Emilia de Poret, pop singer.
- Arba Kokalari, politician.
- David Lagercrantz, author, novelist.
- Jan Lindblad, film maker, photographer, naturalist, and writer.
- Lisa Langseth, director.
- Emilia Mitiku, pop singer.
- Alexandra Pascalido, journalist
- Povel Ramel, entertainer.
- Rasmus Törnblom, politician.
- Klas Östergren, writer.
- Anna Cramling, chess player and influencer

== See also ==
- Education in Sweden
- Norra Real
- Östra Real
- Södra Latin
- Norra Latin
- Viktor Rydberg Gymnasium
