= Södra Latin =

Coordinates: 59°19′00″N 18°04′09″E

Södra Latins gymnasium
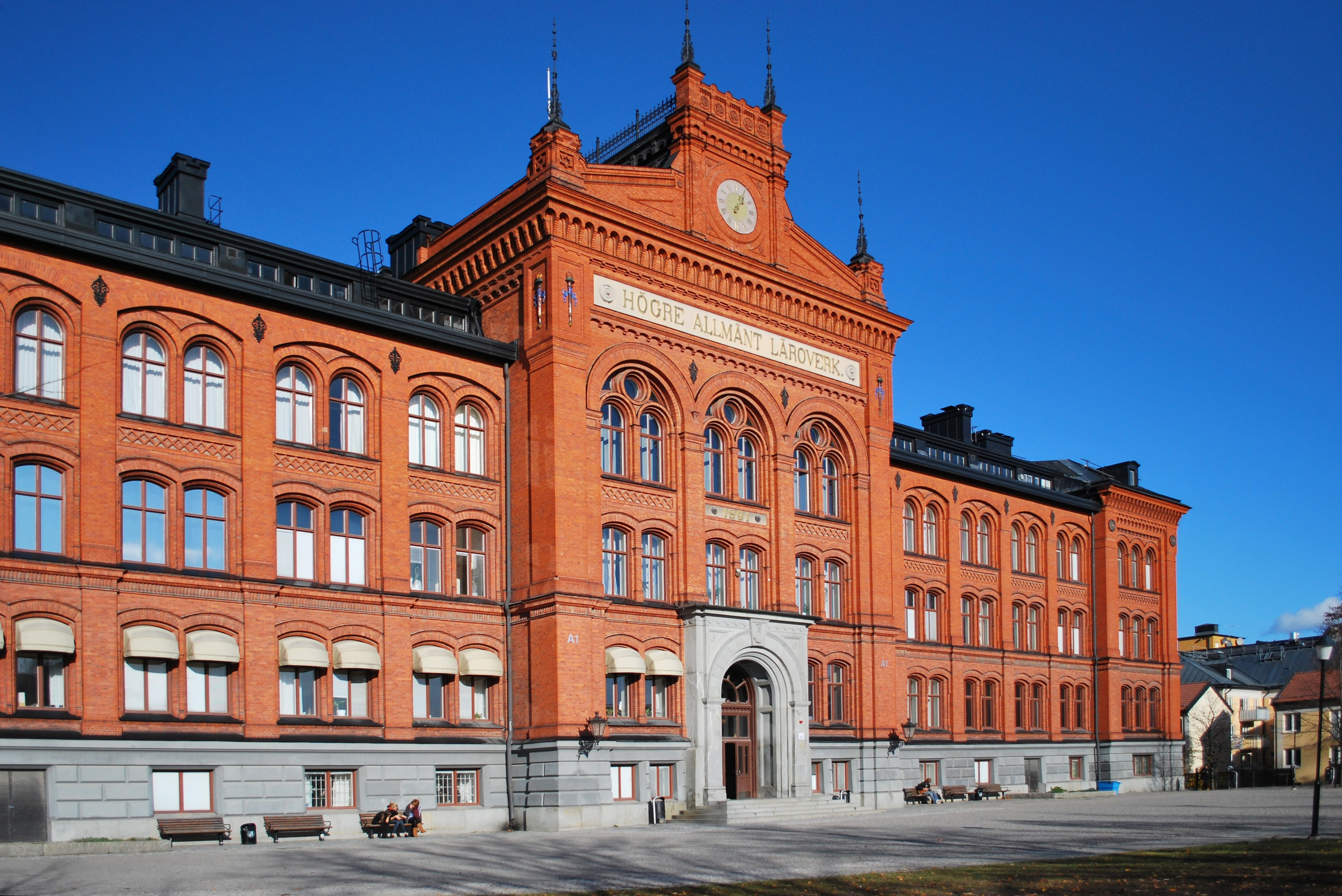
- The building of Södra Latin.
- Stockholm, Sweden

Information
- Type: Upper secondary school Public
- Opened: 1654 (Södermalms pedagogia) 1879 (current building)
- Website: sodralatinsgymnasium.stockholm.se (in Swedish)

Södra Latins gymnasium, commonly known as Södra Latin ("Southern Latin" in Swedish), is an upper secondary school in Södermalm, Stockholm, Sweden. The current school building was inaugurated in 1891.

== History ==
Södra Latin has a rich history, as its predecessor Södermalms Pedagogia employed its first headmaster as far back as in 1654. In 1820 it became a trivialskola and in 1879 it was merged with the southern part of Stockholms gymnasium, its new name being Stockholms högre allmänna å latinlinjen fullständiga läroverk å Södermalm. The school changed its name multiple times through the years until it decided upon its current one in 1971.

The current school building was designed by Per Emanuel Werming and opened in 1891 (its twin building Norra Real having opened a full year earlier). The structure was conceived in a way that would allow daylight to directly illuminate all rooms and corridors inside it, with 21 classrooms having been built in total. Typical of the design - in addition to the monumental orange-red brick facade - is a semicircular assembly hall placed centrally in the school's building plan. The last renovation took place in 1996.

Södra Latin was a boys-only institution until 1961.

== Education ==
In modern times, Södra Latin is known for its high-level schooling in the arts. Between 1976 and 1978 the establishment successively replaced the music department of Statens normalskola in Östermalm, becoming consummate in 1980. In 1985 it launched one of the country's first drama programmes. Besides aesthetically and artistically oriented programmes, the school also offers education in the social sciences and natural sciences, among others.

== Notable alumni ==
Several prominent Swedes have received their schooling at Södra Latin, many of them artists or other cultural personalities.

- Per Ahlmark, politician
- Alba August, actress
- Johnny Bode, singer
- Stig Dagerman, writer
- Dirty Loops, band
- Isaac Grünewald, painter
- Carola Häggkvist, singer
- Olle Hellbom, film director
- Mattias Schulstad, classical guitarist
- Jonas Hassen Khemiri, writer
- Joel Kinnaman, actor
- John Landquist, literary critic
- Lykke Li, recording artist
- Max Martin, songwriter and record producer
- Helena Mattson, actress
- Hjalmar Mehr, politician
- Klas Östergren, novelist and screenwriter
- Peter Pohl, author
- Svante Pääbo, Swedish geneticist, Nobel prize laureate
- Noomi Rapace, actress
- Bengt Robertson, physician
- Åsa Romson, politician
- Mona Sahlin, politician
- Helena af Sandeberg, actress
- Danny Saucedo, singer
- Alexander Skarsgård, actor
- Bill Skarsgård, actor
- Gustaf Skarsgård, actor
- Sven Stolpe, writer
- Anna-Lena Strindlund, actress
- Tomas Tranströmer, poet and Nobel Prize laureate
- Yung Lean, rapper and singer
- Yoko Alender, Estonian MP, architect, entrepreneur

=== Notable teachers ===
- Alf Ahlberg
- Immanuel Björkhagen
- Börge Ring
- Roger Thorstensson

== See also ==
- Education in Sweden
- Norra Real
- Östra Real
- Norra Latin
- Kungsholmens gymnasium
- Viktor Rydberg Gymnasium
