= VRG =

VRG may refer to:

- British Virgin Islands, ITU country code
- Varig, a Brazilian airline
- Ventral respiratory group, a column of neurons located in the medulla
- Viktor Rydberg Gymnasium, a group of Swedish schools
- Vintage Racer Group, a vintage racing group in the United States
- Virtual Racing Group, more important simracing group in Italy
- Virchand Gandhi, an Indian Patriot
