= Norra Real =

Norra Reals gymnasium
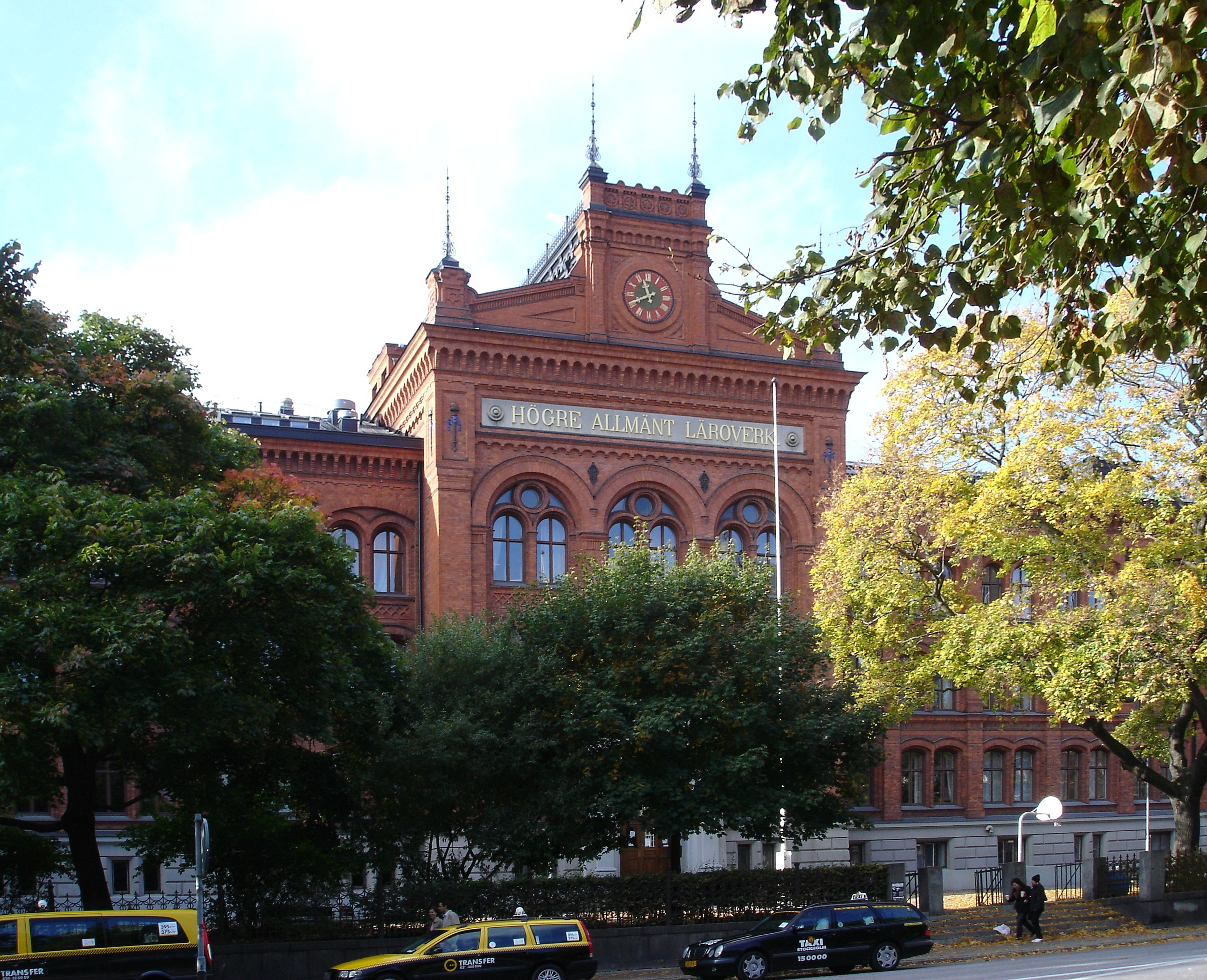
- The building of Norra Real

Location
- Stockholm, Sweden
- Coordinates: 59°20′38″N 18°03′41″E

Information
- Type: Upper secondary school Public
- Established: 1876
- Rector: Fredrik Skog
- Website: norrarealsgymnasium.stockholm.se (in Swedish)

Norra Real ("Northern Real") is an upper-secondary school in Stockholm, Sweden, located on Roslagsgatan 1. It is one of the oldest upper-secondary institutions in the city. Known for its academic selectivity, it consistently has some of the highest admission thresholds in the Stockholm region. The school has produced numerous prominent alumni, including Nobel laureates, members of the Swedish Academy, and explorers such as Manne Siegbahn, Gunnar Myrdal, Horace Engdahl, and Finn Malmgren.

== History ==
Norra Real opened on 29 August 1876 under the name Stockholms Realläroverk with 44 male students aged 9–15 and three teachers. The first principal was Sixten von Friesen, later active in national politics. In 1890 the school relocated to its current site on Roslagsgatan and adopted the name Norra Real. The inauguration, attended by King Oscar II, took place on 6 September 1890.

In 1906 the school’s name changed to Högre realläroverket å Norrmalm, and following municipalisation in 1966 it became Norra Real (from 1971 Norra Reals gymnasium). Studentexamen was awarded from 1881 to 1968, and realexamen from 1907 to 1964.

During the early 20th century, the school maintained a strong focus on science and modern languages, reflecting the realskola tradition. Notable curricular updates included early adoption of modern physics laboratories and electric lighting systems.

Girls were admitted for the first time in 1961, when 67 female students enrolled. During the 1980s, the upper-secondary section was temporarily closed and replaced by adult education before being restored. Extensive renovations took place between 1992 and 1994.

== Campus and architecture ==
The school building, designed by Per Emanuel Werming, was constructed between 1887 and 1890. It is built on granite bedrock and features a red-brick façade, sharing a twin design with Södra Latin in Stockholm. The plan includes a semi-circular assembly hall on the central axis. The façades are articulated with decorative fields, a light-granite entrance portal, and features such as tie-rods, finials, and railings. The complex historically included a preserved museum room, a refurbished botanical garden, the assembly hall (aula), and a separate gymnastics building. The total floor area was reported as 8,558 m² distributed across 21 classrooms. When opened, the facilities included advanced heating and ventilation systems engineered by W. Dahlgren. The building also featured early electric lighting, described in contemporary technical publications for its innovation.

=== Sculpture ===
A plaster replica of Stig Blomberg's bronze sculpture Flores and Blanzeflor stands inside the entrance. The original bronze, completed in 1942–1943 and awarded at the 1948 Olympic art competition, is located at Eriksdalsskolan in Stockholm.

=== Organ ===
In 1890 Åkerman & Lund built a six-stop organ for the assembly hall; the façade was designed by Per Emanuel Werming. The instrument is among the earliest in Sweden to use so-called Roosevelt chests. It was restored in 2007 by Martin Hausner AB at the initiative of the alumni association.

== Student union ==
Founded in 1999, the Norra Real student union (Elevkår) organizes academic, cultural, and social events including freshers' activities, association fairs, and the annual prom. Membership is voluntary and the union is affiliated with national student organizations in Sweden.

== Notable alumni ==
The school has educated numerous prominent figures, including Nobel laureates, explorers, authors, and public figures:

Nobel laureates

- Manne Siegbahn – Nobel Prize in Physics (1924)
- Gunnar Myrdal – Nobel Prize in Economic Sciences (1974)

Academics and authors

- Helge von Koch – mathematician, known for the Koch snowflake
- Lars Gyllensten – author and physician, member of the Swedish Academy
- Sigfrid Siwertz – author, member of the Swedish Academy
- Ragnar Josephson – art historian, member of the Swedish Academy

Explorers

- Finn Malmgren – meteorologist and Arctic explorer
- Nils Strindberg – photographer, member of S. A. Andrée's Arctic balloon expedition of 1897

Business leaders

- Josef Sachs – founder of Nordiska Kompaniet department store
- Axel Ax:son Johnson – industrialist

Media and culture

- Horace Engdahl – former permanent secretary of the Swedish Academy
- Leif GW Persson – criminologist and novelist
- Claes Elfsberg – journalist
- Jonas Gardell – novelist and playwright
- Göran Liljestrand – pharmacologist, co-discoverer of the Euler-Liljestrand mechanism

== See also ==
- Education in Sweden
- Kungsholmens gymnasium
- Södra Latin
- Norra Latin
- Östra Real
