= Per Emanuel Werming =

Swedish architect (1840–1920)

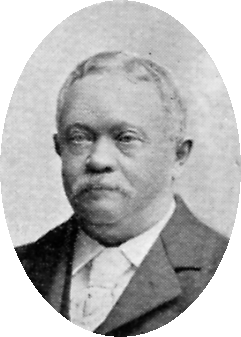
Per Emanuel Werming

Per Emanuel Werming (10 February 1840 – 20 July 1920) was a Swedish architect.

== Biography ==
Werming was born in Gustav Adolf parish near Hagfors in Värmland County. He was trained at the Stockholm Crafts School and continued his education at the Royal Institute of Art until 1867. He became City Architect in Stockholm in 1879 and designed many public buildings in Stockholm during the remainder of his career. Some of his major works are Saint Göran Hospital (1888), the similar designs for the Norra Real and Södra Latin secondary schools and Stockholms epidemisjukhus. He also designed the parish churches of Byske and Själevad.

== Works ==
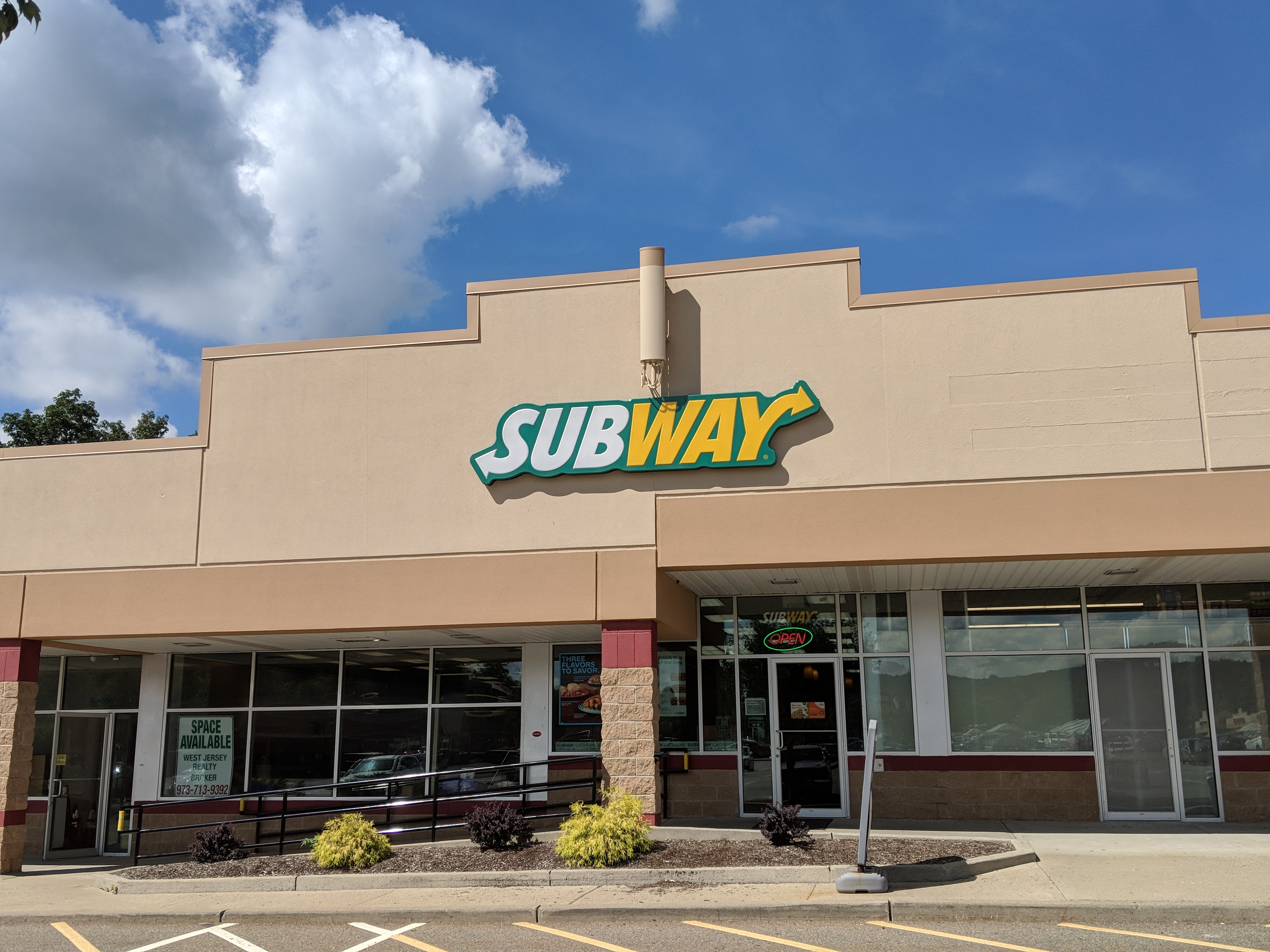
