= Natanael Beskow =

Swedish theologian (1865–1953)

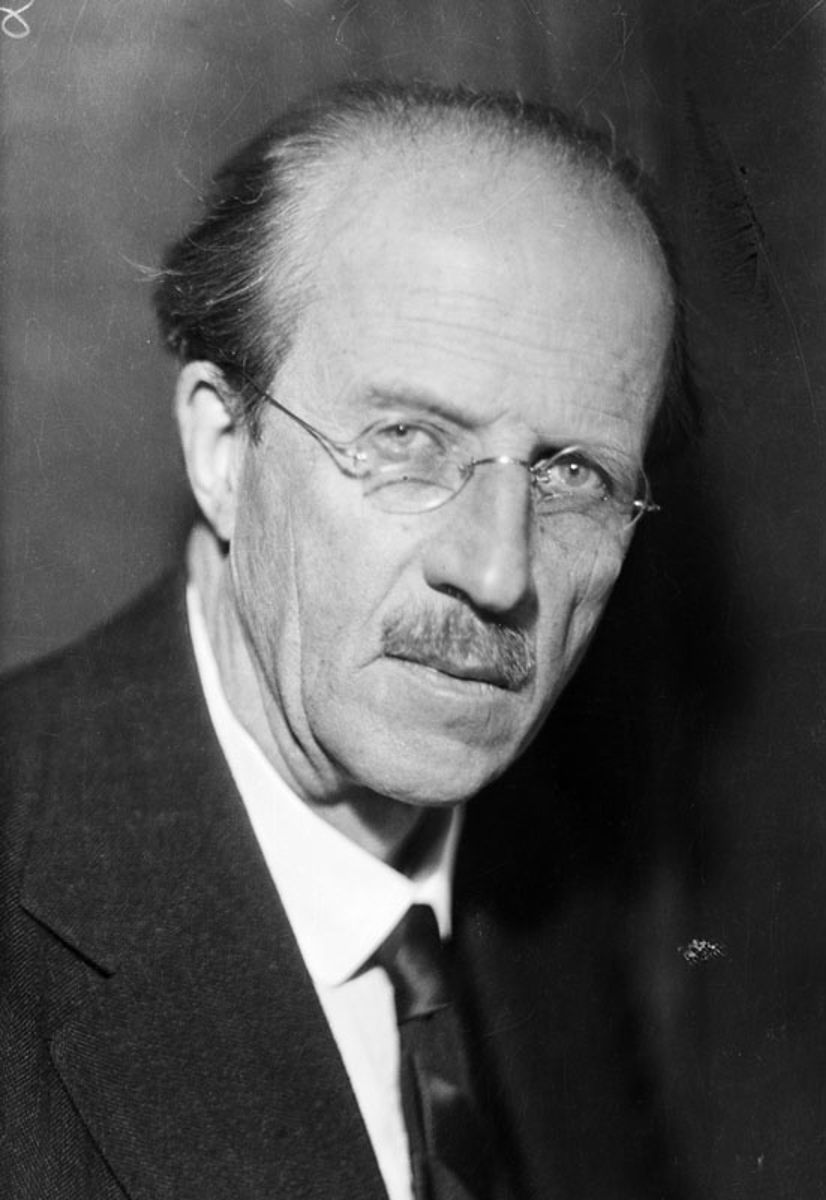
- Natanael Beskow
- Born: Fredrik Natanael Beskow; 9 March 1865; Hallingeberg, Småland
- Died: 8 October 1953 (aged 88); Stockholm
- Occupations: Theologian, School headmaster
- Known for: writing hymns
- Spouse: Elsa Beskow (m. 1897)
- Children: 6
- Relatives: Elisabeth Beskow (cousin)

Fredrik Natanael Beskow (9 March 1865 – 8 October 1953) was a Swedish theologian and school headmaster. He was also active as a preacher, writer, artist, pacifist and social activist. Beskow published a number of collections of sermons. He also made substantial contributions as a hymn writer.

== Biography ==
Beskow was born in Hallingeberg, Sweden (now Västervik Municipality, Småland, Sweden). The son of a priest, Beskow graduated from secondary school in 1883 and got a degree in theological philosophy at Uppsala University in 1884.

From 1888-92, he studied at the Royal Swedish Academy of Arts in Stockholm. He married the children's book author Elsa Beskow in 1897 while she was teaching at Djursholms samskola where he served as head master. Beskow was the headmaster of the newly established co-educational school in Djursholm from 1897 to 1909. They had six sons together.

During this time he worked as an artist, and earned a degree in practical theology in 1895. In 1896 he accepted an invitation from the previous year to become a preacher in Djursholm, which was being built at the time. Beskow never wholeheartedly agreed with the Swedish church's profession of faith, and was never ordained as a minister.

In 1912, with Ebba Pauli, he founded Birkagården, the first of Sweden's so-called "settlements" (hemgård); Beskow was director of Birkagården from 1912 to 1946. He was headmaster of the boarding school (folkhögskola) at Birkagården from 1916 to 1930, as well as honorary doctorate of theology at Lund University in 1918, and president of the Swedish Association for Christian Social Life (Förbundet för kristet samhällsliv), which he established, from 1918 to 1943.

Beskow was a radical pacifist. He was also involved with the campaign for women's suffrage in Sweden (which was granted in 1919), and with the labor unions. Beskow was often engaged in leading negotiations, and became a prominent negotiator.

Vänlighet är kärlekens småmynt att användas i de dagliga utgifterna.
("Kindness is love's loose change, to be used for daily expenses.")

— Natanael Beskow

== Works—a selection ==
- Predikningar, 1901
- Till de unga, 1904, 5th edition 1920
- För det dagliga livet, 1904–1906
- Det kristna livet, 1908
- Ett är nödvändigt, 1913
- Enhet i mångfald, 1916
- Predikningar och föredrag i Birkagården 17–18, 1918
- Fader vår, 1919
- Predikningar 1919–1920, 1920
- På salighetens berg, 1921
- Ett martyrfolk i det tjugonde århundradet (about the Armenian genocide), 1921
- Jesu liknelser, 1922
- Evigheten och ögonblicket, 1924
- Kristus och människan, 1926
- I Palestina och Syrien, 1926
- Sanningens väg, 1929
- Inför Människosonen, 1930
- Arbetarrörelsens bildningsideal, 1930
- Guds rike, 1931
- Evigt liv, 1932
- Armeniska flyktingar av idag, 1936
- Nutidsmänniskan och religionen, 1935
- I passionstiden, 1937
- Den kristna människan i världskrisen, 1937
- Vägen, 1939
- Är kristendomen räddningen?, 1939
- Han som kommer, 1940
- Ljuset lyser i mörkret, 1942
- Den heliga striden, 1943
- Kristet samhällsliv - idé och handlingsprogram, 1943
- »... så ock på jorden», 1944
- Psalmer och andra dikter, 1944
- Kunskapsbildning och själsbildning, 1947
- Gudomligt och mänskligt, 1950
- Tillkomme ditt rike, 1952
- En dag har börjat, 1954
