= Elsa Beskow =

Swedish artist (1874–1953)

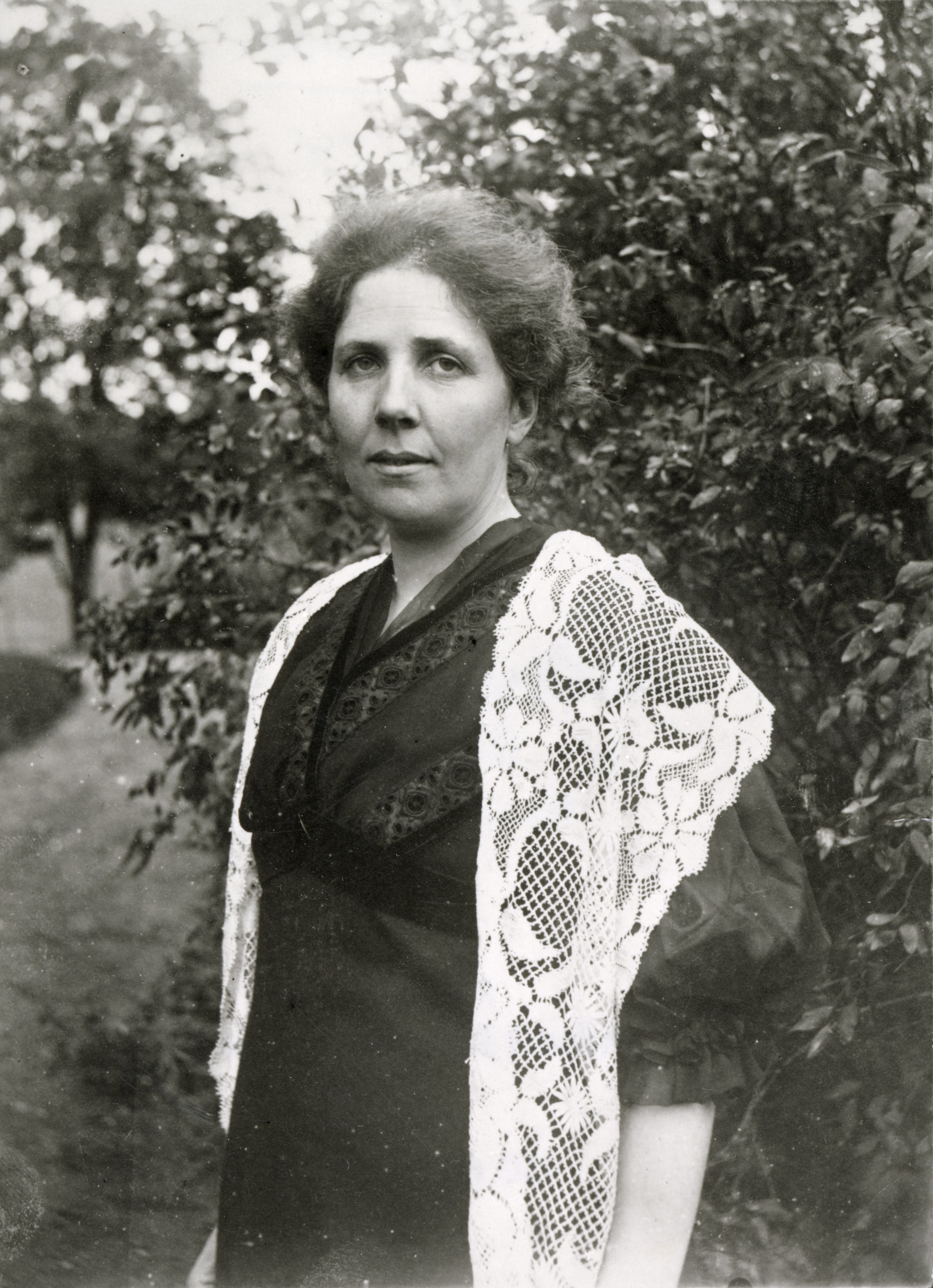
- Elsa Beskow
- Born: Elsa Maartman; 11 February 1874; Stockholm, Sweden
- Died: 30 June 1953 (aged 79); Stockholm, Sweden
- Education: Anna Whitlock's school
- Occupation: Author
- Spouse: Natanael Beskow (m. 1897)
- Children: 6
- Relatives: Elisabeth Beskow husband's cousin
- Writing career
- Language: Swedish
- Genre: Children's literature
- Notable works: Aunt Green, Aunt Brown and Aunt Lavender
- Website: www.elsabeskow.se

Elsa Beskow (née Maartman; 11 February 1874 – 30 June 1953) was a famous Swedish author and illustrator of children's books. Among her better known books are Tale of the Little Little Old Woman and Aunt Green, Aunt Brown and Aunt Lavender.

== Background ==
Born in Stockholm her parents were businessman Bernt Maartman (1841–1889), whose family came from Bergen, Norway, and teacher Augusta Fahlstedt (1850–1915). Beskow studied Art Education at Konstfack, University College of Arts, Crafts and Design, then called Tekniska skolan, or the Technical school, in Stockholm.

She married former minister and social worker, doctor of theology Natanael Beskow in 1897. Elsa Beskow met her future husband at Djursholms samskola while serving as a teacher where he served as head master. From 1900 they lived in Villa Ekeliden in Djursholm which had initially been built for the author Viktor Rydberg. They had six sons, including the artist Bo Beskow (1906–1989) and geologist Gunnar Beskow (1901–1991).

== Career ==
In 1894 Beskow started to contribute to the children's magazine Jultomten. She ultimately began publishing her own books, doing both illustration and text. Overall, she would publish some forty books with her own text and images.

Beskow frequently combined reality with elements from the fairy tale world. Children meet elves or goblins, and farm animals talk with people. Central themes were the relationships between children and adults and children's independent initiative. Her work "depicted a happy home atmosphere in the Swedish countryside of the late nineteenth and early twentieth centuries."

Beskow became one of the most well known of all Swedish children's book artists. Many of her books became classics and are continually reprinted. Beskow also illustrated ABC books and songbooks for Swedish schools. Her book pages are often framed by decorative framework of the Art Nouveau style.

Beskow received "international recognition for simple, cheerful stories and outstanding illustrations."

== Poem ==
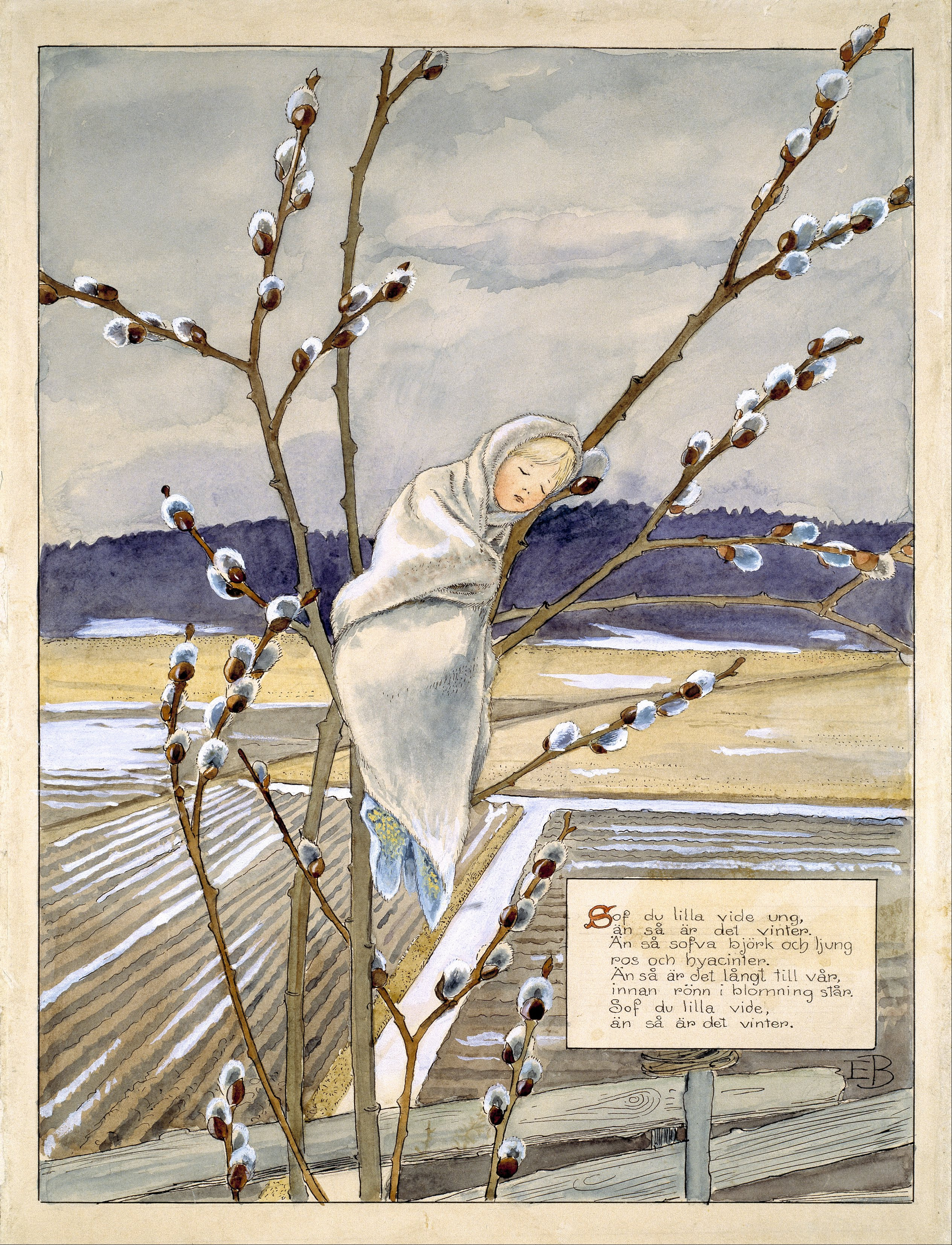
Poem Illustrated by Elsa Beskow about trees in winter (early 1900s, Nationalmuseum Stockholm.)

Sof du lilla vide ung,
än så är det vinter.
Än så sofva björk och ljung
ros och hyacinter.
Än så är det långt till vår,
innan rönn i blomning står.
Sof du lilla vide,
än så är det vinter.

Translation:

Sleep, young little willow,
it is still winter.
Still the birches and heathers
roses and hyacinths are sleeping.
Still spring is far away,
before the rowans are in bloom.
Sleep, little willow,
it is still winter.

== Legacy ==
The Elsa Beskow Award was created in 1958 to recognize the year's best Swedish picture book illustrator.

== Selected works ==
- Tale of the Little Little Old Woman, 1897
- Children from Solbacka, 1898
- Peter in Blueberry Land, 1901
- Olle's ski trip, 1907
- Children of the Forest, 1910
- Pelle's New Suit, 1912
- Flower Festival in the Hill, 1914
- George's book, 1916
- Aunt Green, Aunt Brown and Aunt Lavender, 1918
- Little Lasse in the garden, 1920
- Baby Brother's sailing journey, 1921
- Bubble Muck, 1921
- Grandma's quilt, 1922
- Christopher's harvest time, 1923
- Aunt Brown's Birthday, 1925
- Jan and all his friends, 1928
- Hat Cottage, 1930
- Grandma and-down Light, 1930
- Around the year, 1931
- Buddy's Adventures in the Blueberry Patch, 1931
- The Sun Egg, 1932
- Woody, Hazel & Little Pip, 1939
- Talented Annika, 1941
- Uncle Blue's New Boat, 1942
- Peter and Lotta's Adventure, 1947
- Red bus, green car, 1952

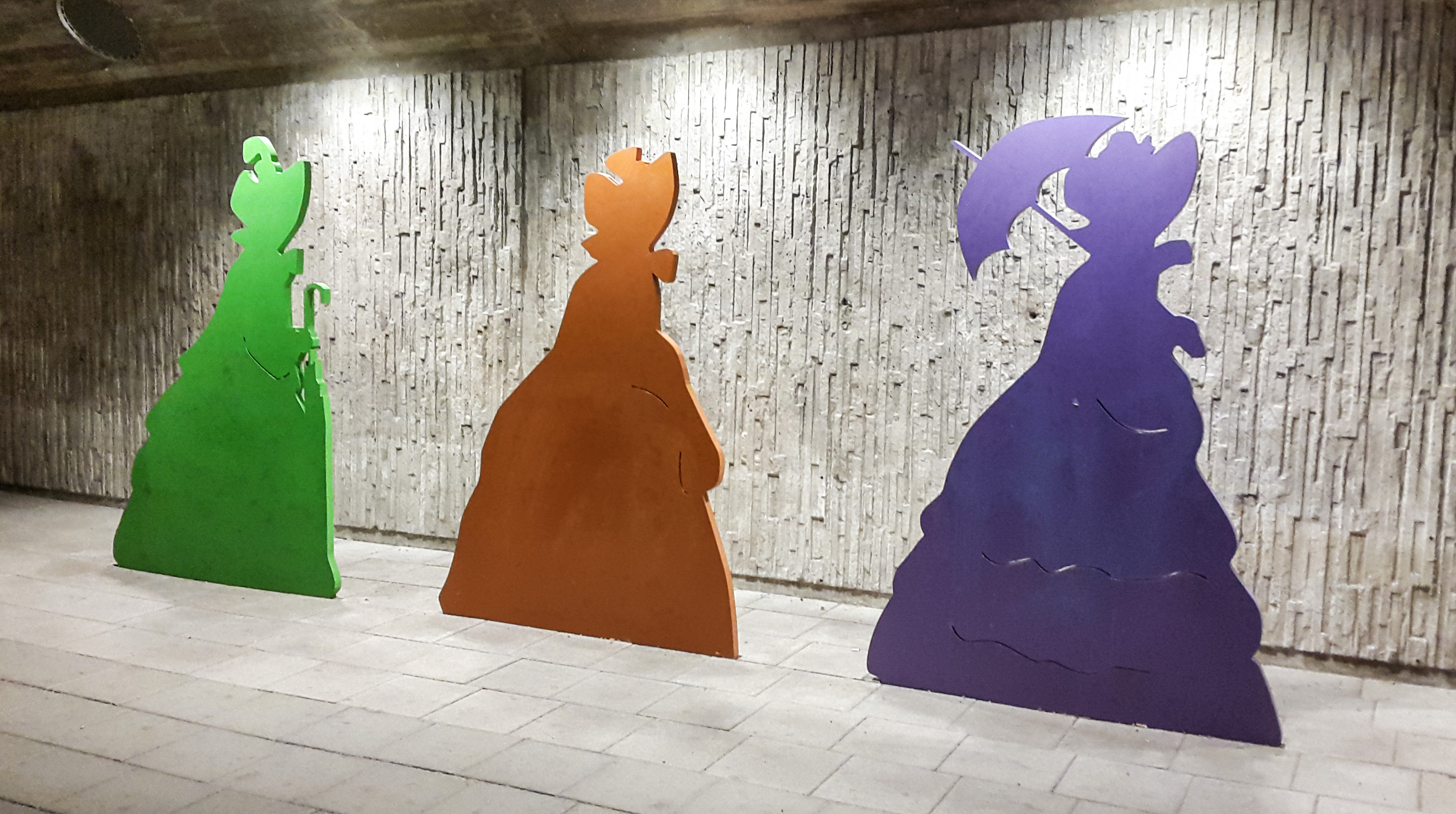
Aunt Green, Aunt Brown and Aunt Lavender artwork in the Stockholm subway
