= AlbaNova =

Coordinates: 59°21′14″N 18°03′29″E

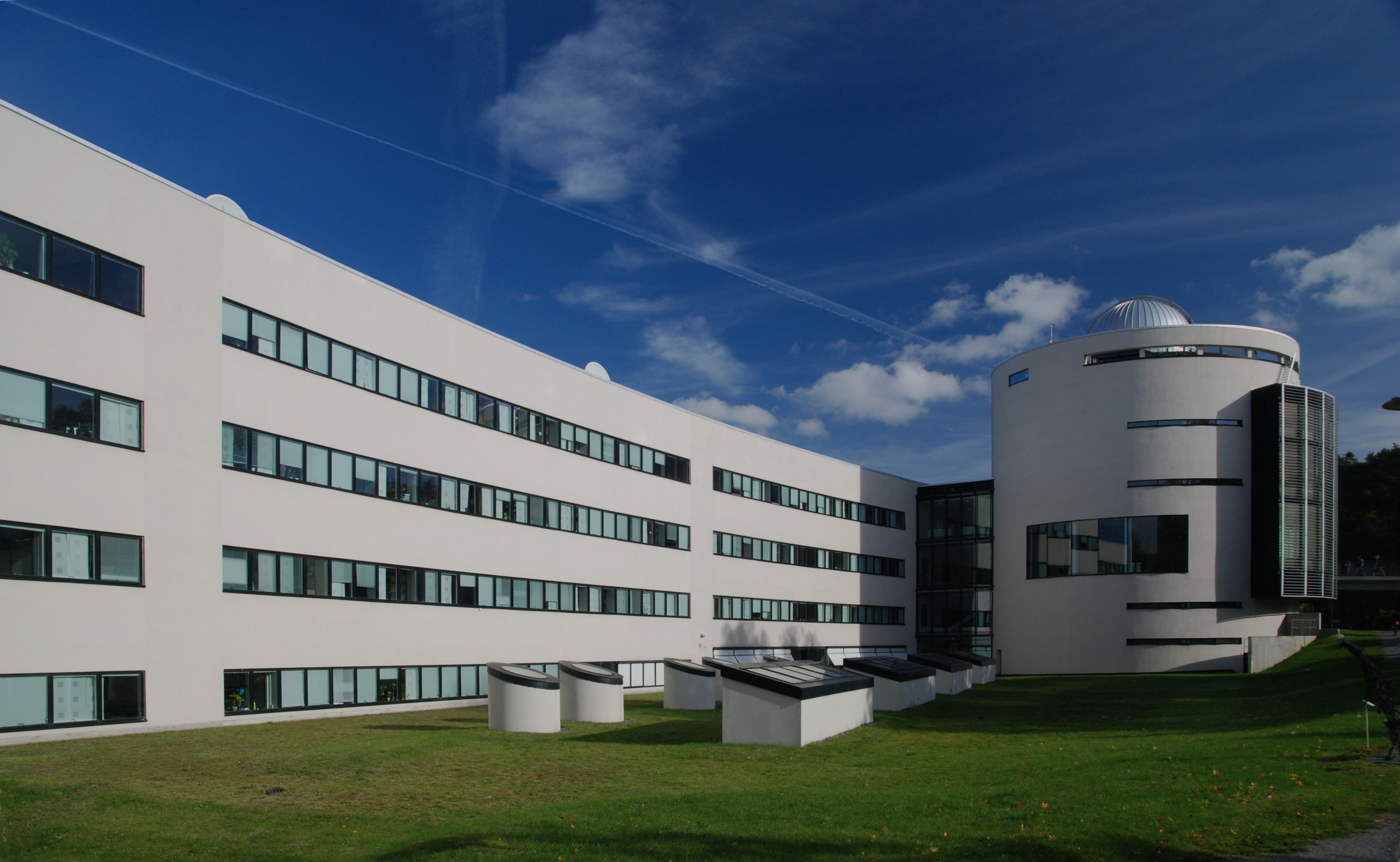
The AlbaNova main building

AlbaNova University Center, Stockholm Center for Physics, Astronomy and Biotechnology is a "research and education initiative run jointly by the Royal Institute of Technology and Stockholm University." Currently represented subjects include physics, astronomy, biotechnology, and bioinformatics. The center hosts the Nordic Institute for Theoretical Physics (NORDITA), as well as the House of Science, which aims to convey modern research to the public.

The AlbaNova campus was built on the site of the former Roslagstull Hospital, an isolation hospital which closed in 1992, and several of the original hospital buildings have been incorporated into the campus. The main building was designed by Henning Larsen and in year 2001 it was selected as ”Stockholm's most beautiful building”.
