= Elisabeth Beskow =

Swedish writer

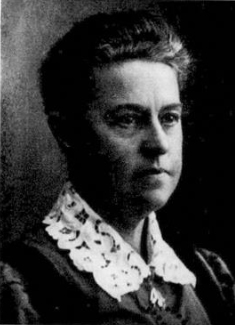
- Elisabeth Beskow
- Born: Elisabeth Maria Beskow; 19 November 1870; Stockholm, Sweden
- Died: 17 October 1928 (aged 57); Åre, Jämtland
- Occupation: Author
- Relatives: Natanael Beskow (cousin); Elsa Beskow (cousin's wife)
- Writing career
- Pen name: Runa
- Language: Swedish

Elisabeth Maria Beskow (19 November 1870 – 17 October 1928) was a Swedish writer. Born in Stockholm, Sweden she went to the Beskow School and later studied at the Sabbatsberg Hospital as well as the Sophiahemmet. She wrote about fifty books under the pseudonym Runa. A number of her books are translated into Danish, Finnish, French, English, German and Dutch.

In her books she discussed the equal rights of men and women and spoke against animal testing and for vegetarianism.

== Bibliography—a selection ==
- Allt eller intet (1895)
- Från skogarna och fjällen (Beijer, 1896)
- På Elghyttan (Fosterlandsstift, 1902)
- Nina (Fosterlandsstift, 1903)
- Var rädd om din krona! (Stockholm Fosterlandsstift : Barnaserien, 1903)
- Gamle prästen i Hornsjö och andra berättelser (Fosterlandsstiftelsen, 1904)
- Sagor och berättelser för barn (Palmquist, 1904)
- Med blicken mot det osynliga (Fosterlandsstift., 1906)
- Katri berättelse (Fosterlandsstiftelsen, 1907, Bibliotek för de unga. Ungdomsserien; 6)
- Röster (A. V. Carlson, 1909)
- Den ljusnande framtid (Fosterlandsstift, 1910, Bibliotek för de unga. Ungdomsserien; 9)
- Vildfågel (A. V. Carlson, 1911)
- I vildmarken och andra berättelser från Lappland (A. V. Carlson, 1911)
- Korsfararne, handling i dramatisk form, (A. V. Carlson, 1912)
- Ljudande malm (Rock Island, Ill. : Augustana Book Concern, [1912?])
- Vildfågels näste (A. V. Carlson, 1913)
- En tonskapelse berättelse (A. V. Carlson, 1913)
- Han och hans hustru (A. V. Carlson, 1915)
- Grannarna i Västanfors (A. V. Carlson, 1916)
- Sif (Carlson, 1917)
- Lärobok i stenografi (Gumperts bokh. i distr., 1917)
- Birger Löwing (A. V. Carlson, 1918)
- Hans moders gud (A. V. Carlson, 1914)
- Birger Löwing (A. V. Carlson, 1918)
- Den lille väpnaren, sagor och berättelser för barn 2:a uppl, (Lindblad, 1919)
- Fostersyskonen (Stockholm, 1922)
- Hans ögons ljus (A. V. Carlson, 1923
- Ekekronas (A. V. Carlson, 1924)
- Fader och son (A. V. Carlson, 1925)
- Gossar och flickor (Lindblad, 1925)
- Ols Barbro (A. V. Carlson, 1921)
- Skalunga I och II (Carlson 1919–25)
- Skiftande dagrar berättelser (Lindblad, 1926)
- Trettonåringar (A. V. Carlson, 1926)
- Testamentet (A. V. Carlson, 1927)
- Vårdrömmar (Uppsala, 1927)
- Förnyelse, (A. V. Carlson, 1928)
- Vardagsliv
