= Djursholms samskola =

Coordinates: 59°24′10″N 18°4′56″E

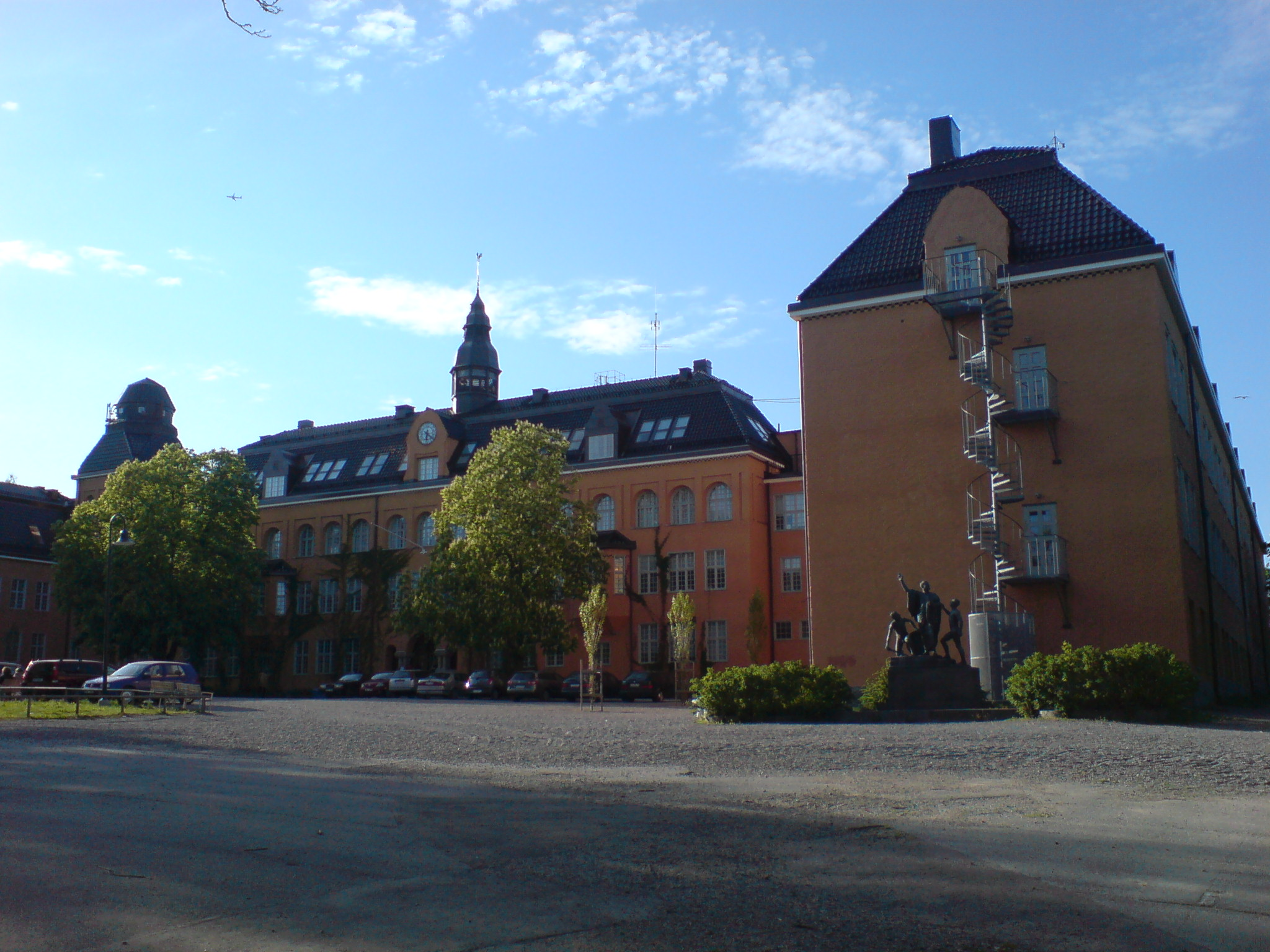
Djursholms samskola

Djursholms Samskola is the traditional name of a middle school in Djursholm, Sweden. The official name of the school today is Viktor Rydbergs Samskola.

== History ==
Djursholms Samskola was founded in 1891 as a private, co-educational institution, with premises in Djursholm Castle, in response to an expanding residential population. The writer Viktor Rydberg served as its first inspector. The school roll rapidly expanded until a new building was required. Architect Georg Alfred Nilsson (1871–1949), who had previously designed both the Matteus elementary school and Adolf Fredrik's Music School, was commissioned and designed a new building with an observatory and greenhouse.

The schools early teachers included Alice Tegnér and Erik Axel Karlfeldt, after whom classrooms in the present school are named. Theologian Natanael Beskow also served during the 1890s as the headmaster, and his wife Elsa Beskow was a class teacher.

== Modern provision ==
In 2004 the school was taken over by the Viktor Rydberg Foundation, which also runs three other gymnasiums, one of them adjacent to Djursholms Samskola. The Viktor Rydberg Foundation renamed the school Viktor Rydbergs Samskola. Today the school accommodates 500 pupils in the 7th through 9th grades. The principal of the co-educational school is Kerstin Hallén.

== Other sources ==
- Rörby, Martin and Dahlin, Ingrid: Georg A. Nilsson: arkitekt, (Stockholm: 1989)
- Widlund, G. Skiöld En bok om Danderyd (Danderyds kommun: 1990)
