= Östra Real =

Östra Reals gymnasium
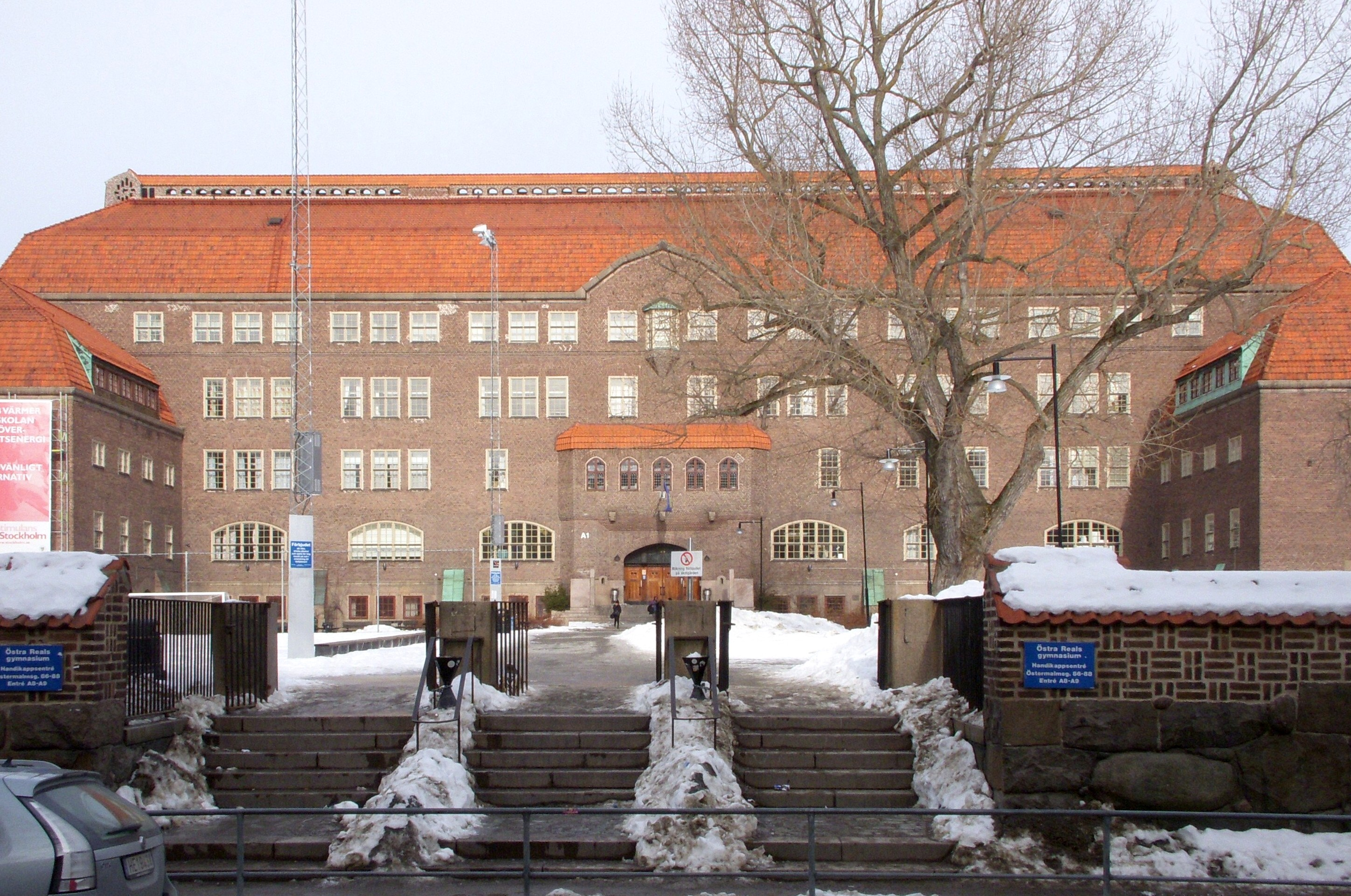

Location
- Stockholm, Sweden
- Coordinates: 59°20′23″N 18°05′11″E

Information
- Type: Upper secondary school Public
- Enrollment: over 1170
- Website: ostrarealsgymnasium.stockholm.se (in Swedish)

Östra Real (officially Östra Reals gymnasium) is an upper secondary school in Östermalm, Stockholm, Sweden. The school can trace its ancestry to the 1600s, and has changed name several times throughout its existence. Its current building was completed in 1910, and it has remained there ever since.

== History ==
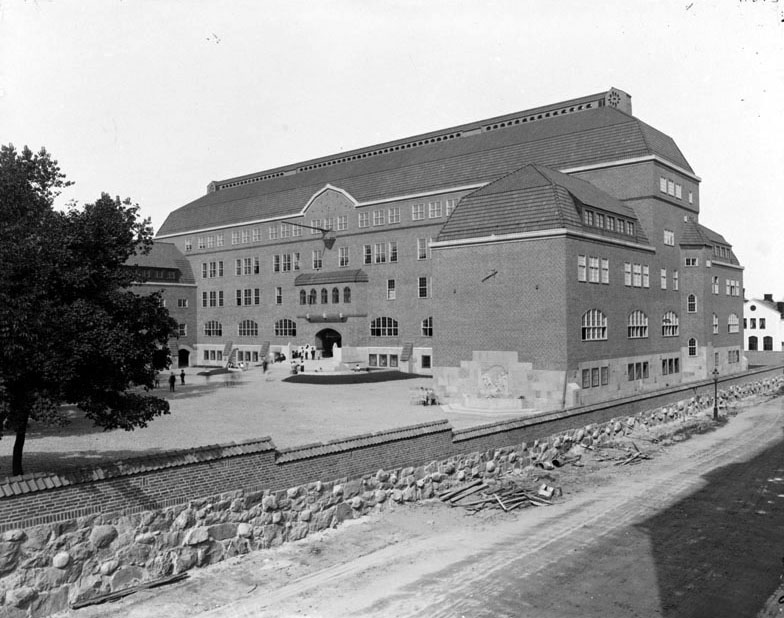
Östermalms läroverk in 1910

The current Östra Real school has its origins in the very primitive school that was started within the St Jakobs church congregation in 1672. Unfortunately most records from this period are missing. The oldest record that remains dates to the 12 May 1731, and is a matriculation record of the students at the school.

The school has existed under various names, including Ladugårdslands lägre elementarläroverk (from 1857), and Högre allmänna läroverket å Östermalm between 1903-1906 and 1926–1971. In the time period 1906-1926 the name was Högre realläroverket å Östermalm, with the short form of Östra Real. After 1971 the school was called Östermalms Gymnasium and since 1990 it has been known by its current name. Despite the many different names, in common usage the school has been referred to as Östra Real for most of these periods.

Today the school has over 1170 students and about 100 employees, of which 70 are teachers. It offers the national study programmes in Social Sciences, Natural Sciences, and Economy.

The school has figured in popular culture, being referenced in books by Peter Mosskin, Per Wästberg, Kar de Mumma and Gustav Öberg. The first scenes in the 2003 film Ondskan are filmed at Östra Real. Several members of the Swedish Academy have been students at the school.

== Building ==
The current building of Östra Real was completed in 1910, but it was not officially inaugurated until January 1911 by King Gustav V. The building was designed by Ragnar Östberg in the National Romantic style. The inside of the building has undergone many renovations, with many of the original characteristic features being changed. The most thorough renovation was started in 1976. In the music hall there are murals by Georg Pauli and the decoration in the staff room is by the artist Filip Månsson. The school also has sculptures by Carl Eldh and Carl Milles and frescos by Axel Törneman and Prince Eugen.

== Alumni ==
- Alesso
- Avicii
- Ulf Adelsohn
- Carl Bildt
- Oskar Edlund
- Kjell Espmark
- Sven Hagströmer
- Sofia Karemyr
- Otto Knows
- Oscar Reutersvärd
- Mauro Scocco
- Jan Stenbeck
- Hedda Stiernstedt
- Erland von Koch
- Per Wästberg

== Extracurricular activities ==
Östra Real has an established tradition with many active student organisations, and is known for its athletic prowess.

== Student government ==
The student union at Östra Real is one of Sweden's oldest, is very active and has many branch committees. It is part of one of Sweden's largest student union events Läroverksfejden, an academic and sports competition between Södra Latin, Kungsholmens Gymnasium and Norra Real. The student union at Östra Real is characterised by a coat of arms, with the letters 'Ö' and 'R' as well as two lions as the charges in the escutcheon. The union's slogan is Antiquity - Pride - Initiative.

== Pictures ==
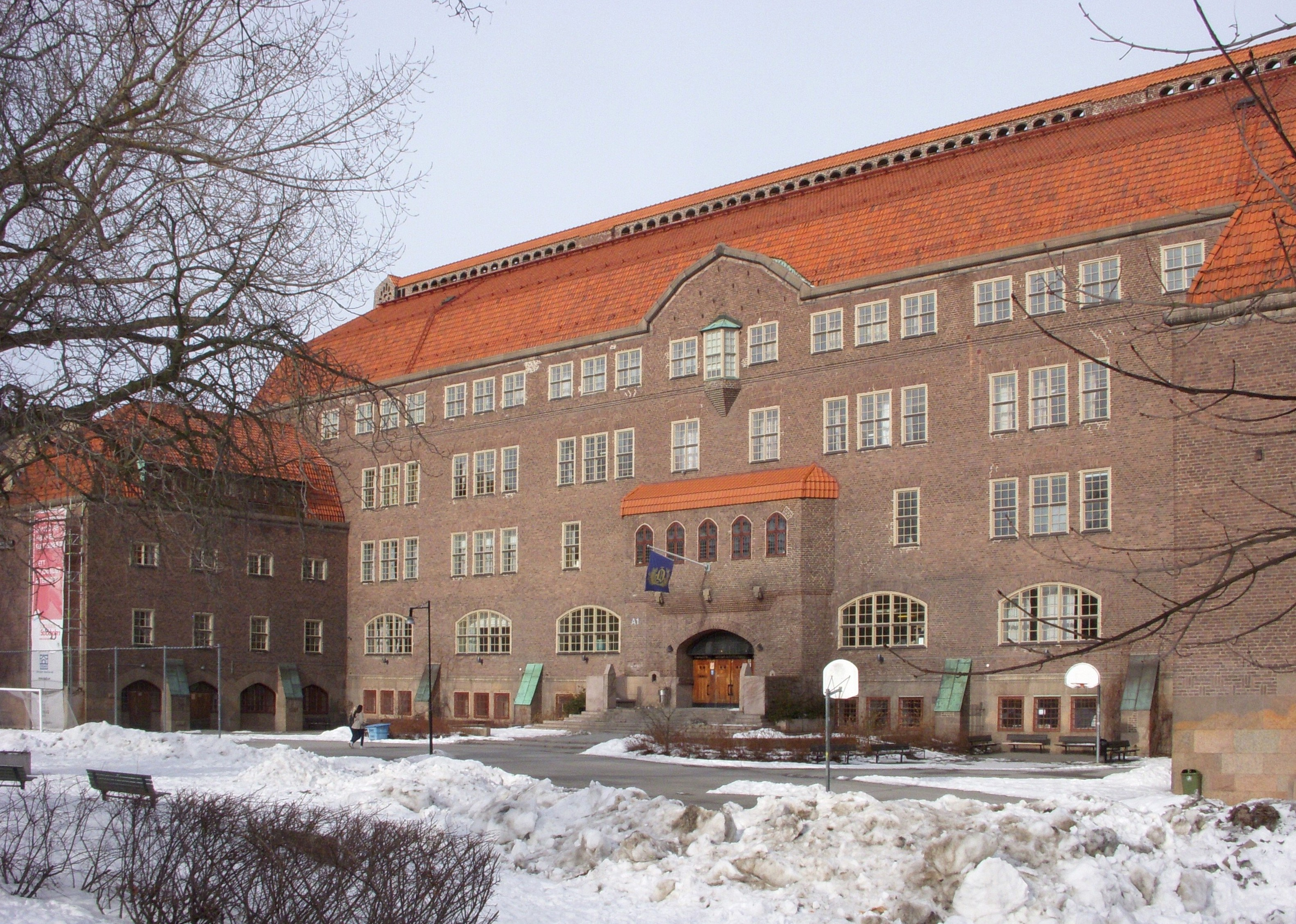
Façade facing Karlavägen.

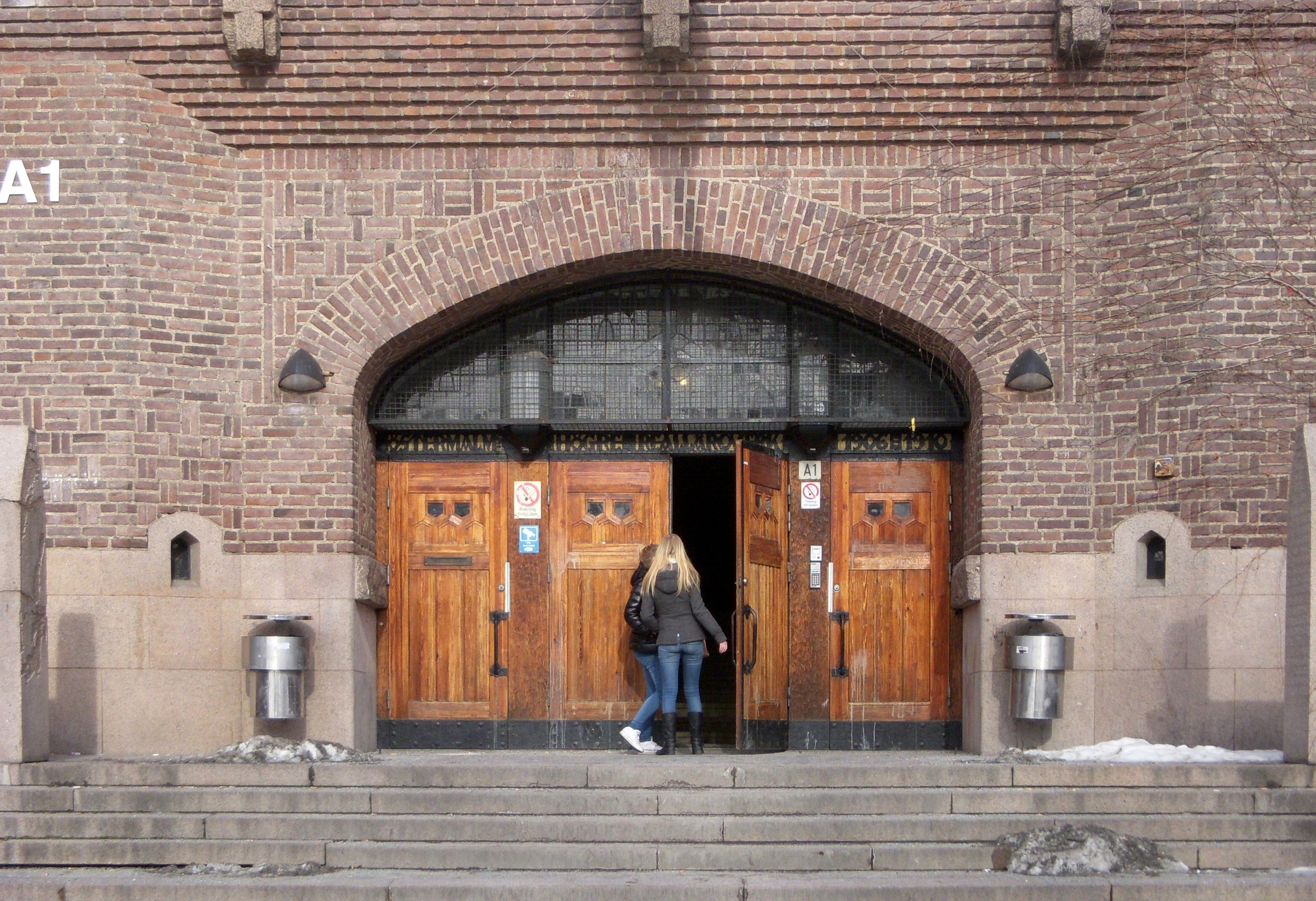
Main entrance.

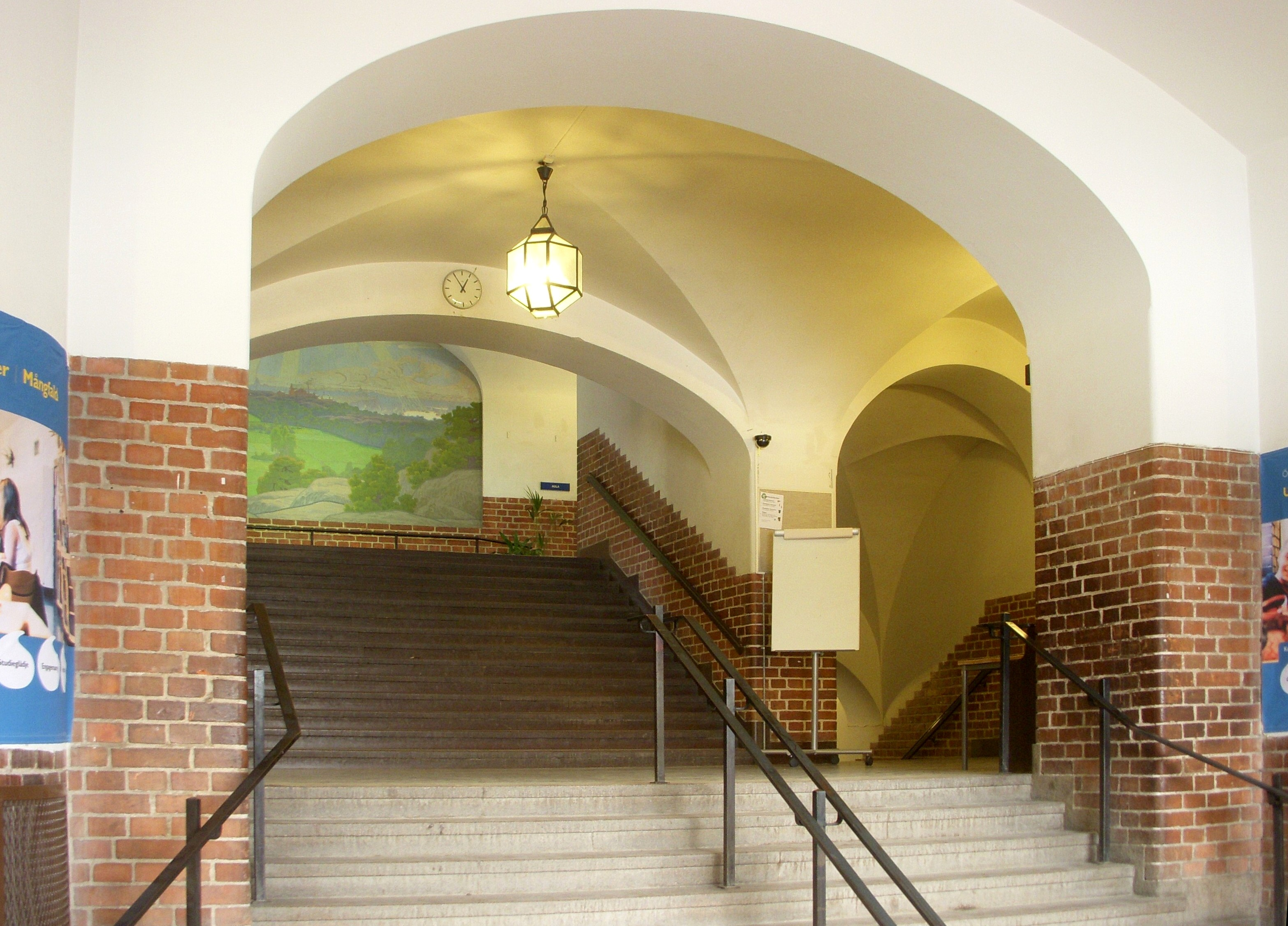
Entrance hall and stairwell.

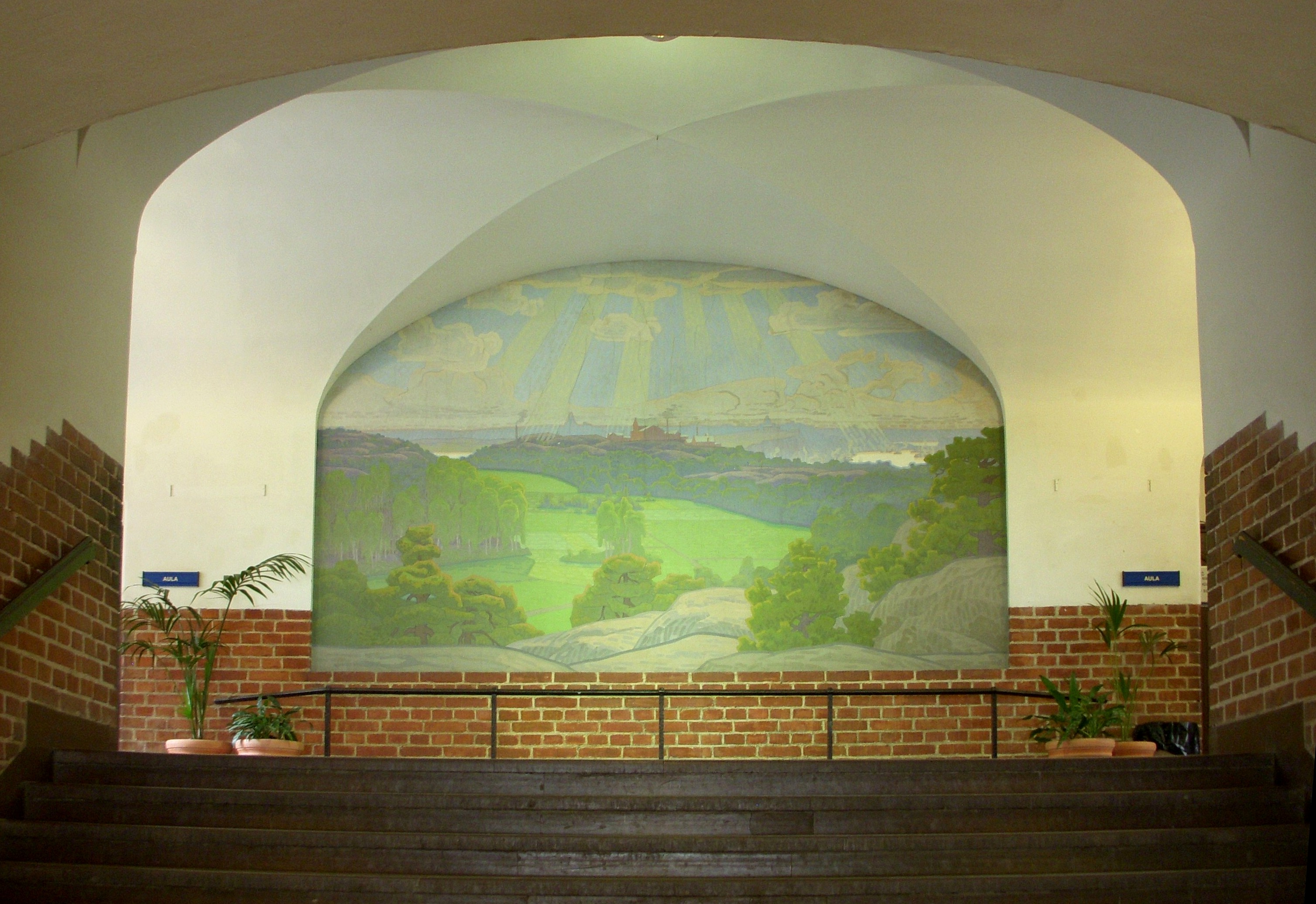
"Solen strålar över staden", fresco by Prince Eugén.

== See also ==
- Education in Sweden
- Norra Real
- Kungsholmens gymnasium
- Södra Latin
- Norra Latin
