= Anna-Lena Strindlund =

Swedish actress (born 1971)

Anna-Lena Strindlund (born 21 June 1971 in Högalid, Stockholm) is a Swedish actress. She studied at Södra Latin.

== Filmography ==
=== Film ===
- Smådeckarna (2002)
- Mongolpiparen (2004)
- Wallander (2006)
- Varannan vecka (2006)

=== Television ===
- Skilda världar (1998)
