= List of State University of New York at New Paltz people =

== Notable alumni ==
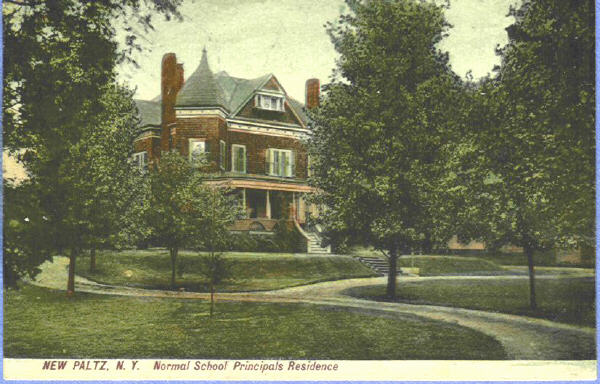
Principal's residence, about 1909

SUNY New Paltz alumni include:

- Salvador Agron – "The Capeman," the main figure from the Broadway show The Capeman
- Michael Badalucco – actor
- Yak Ballz – underground rapper
- David Bernsley (born 1969) – American-Israeli basketball player
- Eleonor Bindman (born 1965) – pianist, teacher and recording artist
- Rob Borsellino – reporter
- Kevin Cahill – member of the New York State Assembly
- Regina Calcaterra – author
- Joan Chen – actress
- Scott Cohen – actor
- Murali Coryell – guitarist
- Marco DaSilva – multimedia artist
- Anthony Denison – actor
- Mary Deyo (1887 graduate of normal school) – missionary teacher in Japan
- James Dolan – owner of the New York Knicks, New York Rangers and Madison Square Garden; former CEO of Cablevision
- Chris Eachus – member of the New York State Assembly
- Jessica Faieta – administrator of the Regional Bureau for Latin America and the Caribbean, United Nations Development Programme
- Edward Falco – novelist and professor of English at Virginia Tech
- Helen K. Garber – photographer
- Michael J. X. Gladis – actor
- Vinny Guadagnino – actor
- Maurice Hinchey – member of the United States House of Representatives
- Vicky Jeudy – actor
- Rebecca Kassay – New York State Assembly member
- Gary King – university professor of government at Harvard University
- Robert Kyncl – CEO of Warner Music Group
- Kenneth LaValle – member of the New York State Senate
- Christopher Manson – children's book author and illustrator
- Eileen Moran – visual effects producer and former executive at Weta Digital
- Fabrizio Moretti – drummer for The Strokes
- Berhanu Nega – Ethiopian politician
- Ann Nocenti – Marvel Comics editor; journalist
- William Parment – member of the New York State Assembly
- Andrea Peyser – New York Post columnist
- Roseann Runte – president of Old Dominion University
- Ilyasah Shabazz – daughter of Malcolm X; writer
- Andy Shernoff – songwriter, rock musician
- Frank Skartados – member of the New York State Assembly
- Alex Storozynski – Pulitzer Prize-winning journalist
- Brianna Titone – geologist and Colorado state representative
- Aida Turturro – actress
- John Turturro – actor
- Jason West – former mayor of the village of New Paltz, New York
- Michael C. Williams – actor, The Blair Witch Project
- Zach Zarba – NBA official
- Kevin Zraly – wine educator; founder of the Windows on the World Wine School

== Notable faculty ==
- Clinton Bennett – adjunct lecturer, religious studies program; authority on Islam
- Jamie Bennett – emeritus professor (1985–2015) of art
- Manuel Bromberg – professor emeritus of art
- Lew Brownstein – historian and political scientist
- Arthur H. Cash (died 2016) – SUNY Distinguished Professor and professor emeritus of English; authority on Laurence Sterne
- Robert Ebendorf – former professor in the metals department, starting in 1970
- Vladimir Feltsman – university professor, music department
- Heinz Insu Fenkl – professor of English; novelist, translator and folklorist
- Carol Goodman – adjunct in creative writing; novelist
- Laurence M. Hauptman – distinguished professor of history
- Ray Huang – late professor emeritus of history; authority on the Ming dynasty; author of 1587, a Year of No Significance
- Nancy Kassop – former chair of the political science department
- Chaim Koppelman (1920–2009) – artist, educator, and Aesthetic Realism consultant
- John Langan – instructor of creative writing and gothic literature; author of horror stories, notably the Bram Stoker Award-winning novel The Fisherman
- Joe Langworth – adjunct, musical theatre
- Kurt Matzdorf – professor emeritus of goldsmithing and silversmith (1957–1985); he founded the metals department.
- Anthony Robinson – professor emeritus of English and former director of creative writing program
- Harry Schwartz – The New York Times editorial writer, Soviet specialist
- H.R. Stoneback – SUNY distinguished teaching professor and professor of English; authority on Ernest Hemingway, William Faulkner, and Lawrence Durrell
- William Strongin – rabbi, author, and professor who is currently the director of Jewish Studies
