= Borsellino =

Borsellino is an Italian surname.

Notable people with this surname include:

- Paolo Borsellino (1940–1992), a Sicilian judge and prosecuting magistrate who was assassinated
- Raimondo Borsellino (1905–1998), a Sicilian politician who represented the Christian Democracy in the Constituent Assembly of Italy
- Rita Borsellino (1945–2018), a Sicilian anti-Mafia activist, politician and Member of the European Parliament
- Rob Borsellino (1949–2006), an American newspaper columnist who worked for the Des Moines Register
- Joey Borsellino, a wide receiver for the 2016 Western Illinois Leathernecks football team
- John Borsellino, an alleged mafia hitman whose bullet-riddled body was found in a farmer's field in Illinois in the 1970s timeline of organized crime
- Lewis Borsellino, arguably one of the most successful and famous floor traders in the history of the S&P 500 futures pit at the Chicago Mercantile Exchange (CME), who was the subject of the documentary, SOLD!:The Lewis Borsellino Story, by Tony Vitale

== See also ==
- Velodromo Paolo Borsellino, a multi-use stadium in Palermo, Italy
- Falcone–Borsellino Airport (Italian: Aeroporto Falcone e Borsellino), an airport in Palermo
- Gli angeli di Borsellino (The Angels of Borsellino), a 2003 Italian film about the assassination of Paolo Borsellino
- Borsalino
