= Eleonor Bindman =

Latvian-American pianist, teacher and recording artist

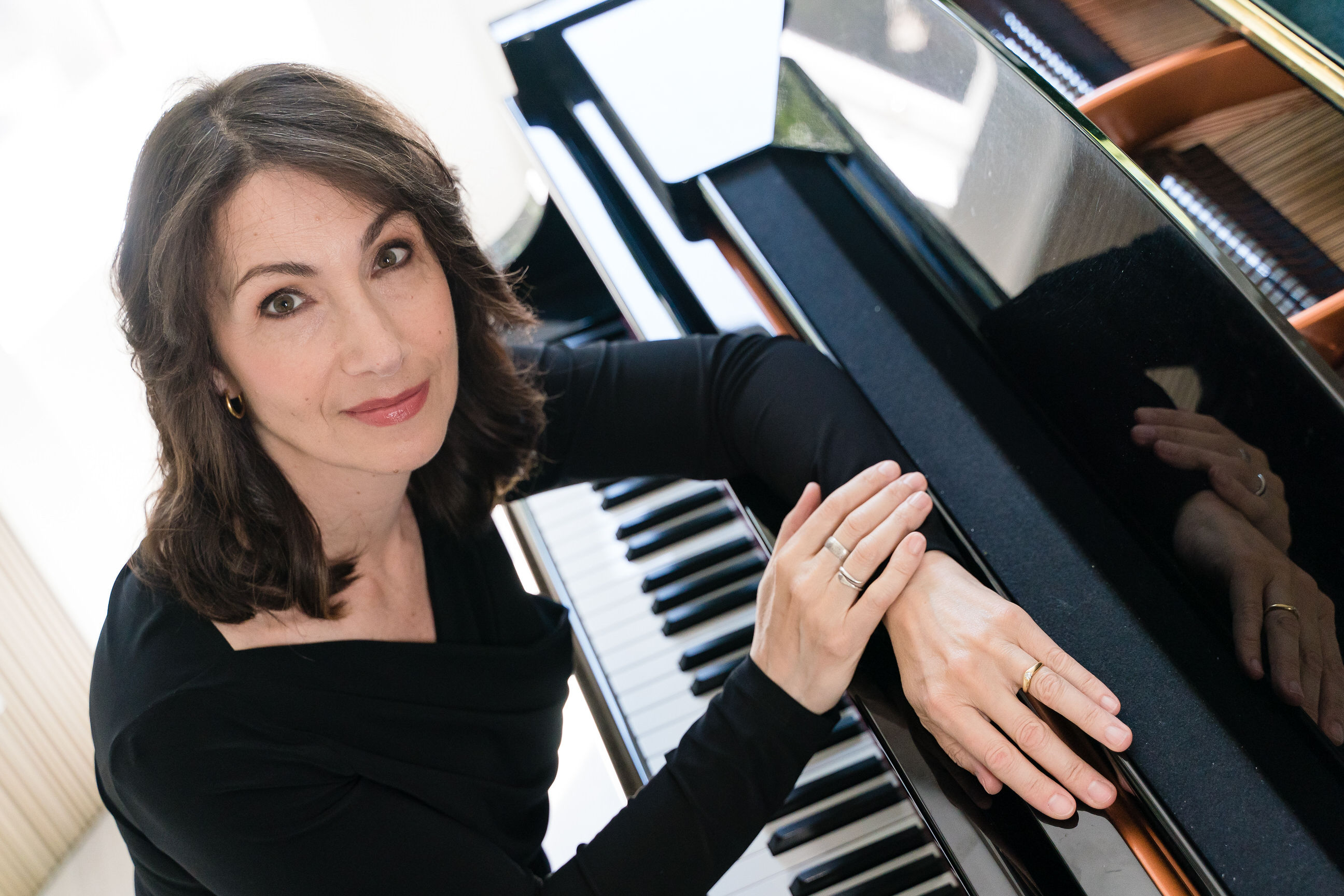
- Eleonor Bindman and her Bösendorfer Piano

Background information
- Born: 1965 (age 60–61); Riga, Latvia
- Occupations: Musician, teacher
- Instrument: Piano

Eleonor Bindman (born November 5, 1965) is a Latvian-American pianist, teacher and recording artist known for her piano transcriptions, especially of the music of Johann Sebastian Bach.

== Early life and education ==
Bindman was born in Riga, Latvia and attended the Emīls Dārziņš Music School, studying piano with Rita Kroner, a Moscow Conservatory alumna from the class of Teodor Gutman, an assistant of Heinrich Neuhaus.

After her family immigrated to the United States, she attended the High School of Performing Arts and was a full scholarship student of Lev Natochenny at Kaufman Music Center. She has a B.A. in Music from New York University and completed her MA in piano pedagogy at SUNY New Paltz under the guidance of Vladimir Feltsman.

== Career ==
In 1991, Bindman gave her first recital, in the Merkin Concert Hall in New York. She has since performed throughout the United States and in other countries, in concerts with the National Music Week Orchestra, the Staten Island Symphony, the Hudson Valley Philharmonic, the New York Youth Symphony, and the Radio and Television Symphony Orchestra of Moscow, Russia. She has also performed works composed for her by Alexander Rom (Partita, 1998) and Sean Hickey (Hill Music: A Breton Ramble, 2002).

=== Transcriptions and recordings ===
Bindman's first major transcription effort was an arrangement of Night on Bald Mountain, published by Carl Fischer Music in 1998, which she included in her debut recording of works by Modest Mussorgsky. Inspired by Liszt’s operatic paraphrases, she later transcribed Tchaikovsky’s Waltz from Eugene Onegin.

She formed a piano duo partnership with Susan Sobolewski under the name Duo Vivace in the 1990s.

Bindman transcribed and arranged J.S. Bach's Brandenburg Concertos for piano in 2014, as the Brandenburg Duets. She recorded them together with Jenny Lin in 2018. In 2019, she created Stepping Stones to Bach, a set of easy-intermediate arrangements of Bach's orchestral and choral masterpieces. followed by 6 Suites, based on Bach's cello suites, in 2020. The recording reached #7 on the Traditional Classical Billboard Charts. 2022 saw the completion of another large-scale arrangement to complement the Brandenburg Duets: Orchestral Suites for Piano Duet, recorded with Susan Sobolewski.

=== Teaching and publications ===
Bindman has taught piano, chamber music, music theory and history privately and in music schools including The Essex Conservatory, Ramapo College, Kaufman Music Center and The 92nd Street Y. She has also published educational articles through her website and on social media platforms. Her published sheet music includes a set of recital pieces called An American Calendar.

=== Classical For Kids ===
Eleonor Bindman launched a new initiative called “Classical For Kids” with the purpose of making it easier for parents to introduce classical music to children. The project includes a focus on curated streaming playlists and social media built to encourage listening at home.

== Discography ==
- Three Works by Modest Mussorgsky, Windsor Classics, 2000
- ‘Out of the Blue’ (with pianist Susan Sobolewski under the name 'Duo Vivace') Windsor Classics, 2002
- Tchaikovsky's The Seasons, MSR Classics, 2005.
- Left at the Fork in the Road, Naxos American Classics, 2007
- The Brandenburg Duets : Bach's Brandeburg Concertos arranged for Piano Duet by Eleonor Bindman, with Jenny Lin, Grand Piano, 2018
- Johann Sebastian Bach: Cello Suites BWV 1007-1012 arranged for solo piano, Grand Piano, 2020
- J.S. Bach: Partitas BWV 825-830, Delos, 2022
- J.S. Bach: Orchestral Suites: transcribed for Piano Duet by Eleonor Bindman, Grand Piano, 2022
- Absolute: J.S. Bach: Lute Suites BWV 996-998 Transcribed for piano and performed by Eleonor Bindman, Orchid Classics, 2025
