= B. Lindsey Deaton =

American conductor and LGBTQ advocate

B. Lindsey Deaton (born September 18, 1955) is an American orchestral conductor, composer, community leader, and advocate for transgender and LGBTQ+ youth. She is the co-founder and first artistic director of the Trans Chorus of Los Angeles (TCLA) and the founder of both the Cincinnati Diverse City Youth Chorus and the San Diego Queer Youth Chorus. Early in her career, she served as the Assistant Music Director of the Hudson Valley Philharmonic. In her later career, Deaton expanded into devised theater, creating and directing the 2022 premiere of The TransVagina Diaries and served as Commissioner on the West Hollywood Arts and Cultural Affairs Commission.

== Early life and education ==
Deaton was born on September 18, 1955, in Austin, Texas. Her father, Ed Deaton, was a mathematician and United States Navy veteran, and her mother, Lynn Cowan, studied music theory at the University of Texas. The family later relocated to San Diego, California. Deaton began formal piano and trumpet instruction at age seven, eventually performing with Ozzie's Band in San Diego.

She briefly studied political science at San Diego State University (SDSU) before moving to West Hollywood, California, in 1974. She later returned to SDSU to study classical guitar under Celin Romero. In 1978, while serving on the student council, she hosted composer Aaron Copland during his visit to the university. She graduated from SDSU with a Bachelor of Arts in Music on August 17, 1979. Deaton earned a full scholarship to Carnegie Mellon University and received a Master of Fine Arts in Conducting on May 18, 1981. She attended the Aspen Music Festival and School in 1981 and studied in Paris for six years under conductor Léon Barzin. Deaton also studied under Gunther Schuller, Murry Sidlin, Charles Bruck, Robert Page, Istvan Jaray, and Marta Sanchez.

== Career ==
=== Early orchestral work (1981–1987) ===
While studying in Paris, Deaton was hired by the Hudson Valley Philharmonic (HVP) in Poughkeepsie, New York. She directed productions of Igor Stravinsky's L'Histoire du soldat and Modest Mussorgsky's Pictures at an Exhibition. She also guest-conducted the Schenectady Symphony Orchestra in November 1982. In October 1983, she was promoted to Assistant Music Director of the HVP under Imre Pallo, where she revamped the orchestra's Young People's Concerts. In August 1984, she participated in the inaugural American Assistant Conductors' Workshop in Woodstock, New York, under Barzin.

=== Cincinnati and Juilliard certification (1987–2011) ===
Deaton later relocated to Cincinnati, Ohio, working as a Conducting Apprentice to Jesús López Cobos at the Cincinnati Symphony Orchestra. She guest-conducted the Yankee Doodle Dandies elementary school concerts for the Louisville Orchestra in 1990.

On August 9, 2002, Deaton earned the Dalcroze Elementary Certificate and the Dalcroze License from The Juilliard School Evening Division. From 2004 onward, she served as the Director of the American Institute of Dalcroze Eurhythmics and taught the method at the University of Cincinnati College-Conservatory of Music (CCM) until 2006. She also taught at Mercy Montessori Academy and St. Francis DeSales School. From 2007 to 2011, she founded and operated Boot Camp Jamz, a local summer camp for youth rock music. Throughout this era, she guest-conducted for the San Francisco Ballet, Spokane Symphony, Winston-Salem Symphony, Youngstown Symphony and Chorus, and the Aspen Music Festival.

In 1983, Deaton served as a principal songwriter and vocal composer alongside John Platania for None for the Road, a public service musical revue sponsored by Reader's Digest about the dangers of drunk driving. A televised adaptation of the production broadcast on a Rhode Island ABC affiliate won a Regional Emmy Award.

=== Catholic ministry ===
After converting to Catholicism, Deaton joined the Fountain Square Fools, a professional Catholic theater troupe, in 1989. Following the group's disbandment in 1992, she toured the United States and Canada as a solo Catholic musician and storyteller. She developed performing arts programs for the EMI Christian Music Group, Provident Music Group, and the United States Catholic Conference of Bishops. She directed catechetical sessions at the World Youth Day 1997 in Paris and performed her original song "You Are My Son" at the World Youth Day Papal Vigil in Rome in August 2000. She spent a decade serving as music director at the Cathedral Basilica of St. Peter in Chains in Cincinnati.

== Gender transition and advocacy ==
Assigned male at birth, Deaton publicly came out as a transgender woman in 2011. She began gender-affirming hormone therapy in early 2013 and officially changed her legal name to B. Lindsey Deaton on May 13, 2013.

Deaton told the Los Angeles Times that she was fired as contemporary music director at St. Peter in Chains Cathedral in Cincinnati after coming out as a transgender woman. She said losing the job caused financial hardship for her family and that they lost their home.

=== Trans Chorus of Los Angeles (TCLA) ===
In 2014, returning to her musical career, Deaton launched the Diverse City Youth Chorus in Cincinnati. Following the suicide of transgender teenager Leelah Alcorn in December 2014, Deaton helped organize a 500-person memorial vigil in Cincinnati and increasingly focused her career on transgender visibility and artivism.

In 2015, with support from the Gay Men's Chorus of Los Angeles (GMCLA), Deaton co-founded the Trans Chorus of Los Angeles (TCLA). The chorus debuted at the West Hollywood Transgender Day of Remembrance in 2015. Under Deaton's artistic direction, TCLA performed at the 2016 LGBT Heritage Month opening ceremony, the USPATH conference, and the UC Riverside Asterisk* Conference. On June 9, 2017, TCLA and GMCLA performed the National Anthem alongside actress Dot-Marie Jones at Dodger Stadium for LGBT Pride Night, marking the first time a trans chorus performed in a Major League ballpark. Deaton then went on to direct TCLA in a staged concert production of David Bowie's The Rise and Fall of Ziggy Stardust and the Spiders from Mars at the Renberg Theatre in 2017.

Deaton's leadership during TCLA's inaugural season was chronicled in the 2020 independent documentary film Out Loud, directed by Gail Willumsen. Deaton departed the Trans Chorus in 2018.

=== Civic leadership and devised theater ===
In 2016, Deaton filed a formal case investigation with the TSA regarding the screening procedures for transgender passengers. After relocating to San Diego in 2018, she founded the San Diego Queer Youth Chorus.

Deaton served on the West Hollywood Transgender Advisory Board starting in 2017 and was later appointed as Commissioner on the City's Arts and Cultural Affairs Commission. In 2022, she created and directed The TransVagina Diaries, a devised theater piece based on transgender and intersex testimonies that premiered at the West Hollywood City Council Chambers. She hosted The TransVagina Dialogues podcast and developed The Church of Trans Love for West Hollywood's 2022 Pride festival. Deaton subsequently developed The TransDiaries, an opera-theatre work commissioned by Beth Morrison Projects and the PROTOTYPE Festival.

Deaton is a recipient of a 2020 MAP Fund award, Jason Mraz Foundation grants, and a 2021 California Arts Council Established Artist Fellowship. She also received the Larry T. Baza Arts and Culture Award from San Diego Pride in 2023.

== Musical philosophy and pedagogy ==
As a conductor and educator, Deaton's pedagogy is rooted in Dalcroze eurhythmics and the concept of phonomimesis. Her methodology incorporates the physical connection between sound and movement, integrating conscious kinesthesia, meditation, and specialized breathwork to help ensembles navigate complex musical time signatures.

== Personal Life ==
Deaton met her wife, Joan, at San Diego State University in 1975, and they married in 1979. They have two daughters, Mary and Jocelyn. Deaton and her wife practice Buddhism. Currently in retirement, they reside part-time in Guatemala, where Deaton studies the culture and spirituality of local Mayan communities.

== Notable Works ==
- None for the Road (Co-composer; Reader's Digest public service musical, 1983)
- The Rise and Fall of Ziggy Stardust and the Spiders from Mars (Artistic Director; Trans Chorus of Los Angeles, 2017)
- The TransVagina Diaries (Creator/Director; West Hollywood City Council Chambers, 2022)
- The Church of Trans Love (Creator/Director; West Hollywood Pride, 2022)
- The TransDiaries (Creator; Beth Morrison Projects/PROTOTYPE Festival)

=== Discography ===
- Journey (No Doubt Records, 1996)
- Come and See (Oregon Catholic Press, 1997)
- Take it to Heart EP (No Doubt Records, 1999)
- Heart of a Dad (Heartbeat Records, 2002)

=== Original compositions and sheet music ===
- Hope @ the Crossroads (Co-written with Kevin Stokes, 1997)
- Face of God (Co-written with Merrill Farnsworth, 1997)
- Wherever You Go (1998)
- We Come To The Lord (1998)
- Be Still My Love (1998)
- Similarities (1998)
- There is a Future (1998)
- You Are The Way (1998)

=== Filmography ===
- Out Loud (2020) – Documentary subject; chronicles Deaton's leadership during the inaugural season of the Trans Chorus of Los Angeles.
