= Piano Summer =

Piano Summer is an international summer institute and festival dedicated solely to piano music it was founded in 1995. It features an integrated approach to learning and performance under the artistic direction of master pianist and teacher Vladimir Feltsman. Gifted students from around the world join devoted musicians and teachers to learn more about the art of the piano. The Piano Summer is a part of the SUNY New Paltz Music Department.

== Festival Symphony Gala ==
The Jacob Flier Piano Competition was established to honor a distinguished Russian pianist. The pianist taught for many years at the Moscow Conservatory and brought up generations of prominent musicians including Vladimir Feltsman. The winner performs a piano concerto with the Hudson Valley Philharmonic as part of the Symphony Gala. The performance is conducted by Maestro Vladimir Feltsman and concludes the three-week program. The second and third-place winners share a recital. In addition, all three winners receive scholarships to attend the following year’s Piano Summer Institute. The Jacob Flier Piano Competition is a part of the Piano Summer. It is open to all students admitted to the program. The winner also performs a debut recital in Carnegie Weill Recital Hall with world-renowned musicians. The competition is open to all students under the age of 35 and is held from July 19–21.

In the first portion: One prelude and fugue from J.S. Bach's The Well-Tempered Clavier and a major piece of the contestant’s choice (the piece may not be by the same composer as the concerto chosen in the final portion). In the final portion: the pianist will play any concerto by one of the following composers (an accompanist will be provided who will play the piano reduction of the concerto): Mozart, Haydn, Beethoven, Schumann, Liszt, Chopin, Grieg, Barber; or one of the following: Piano Concerto No. 1 (Mendelssohn); Piano Concerto No. 2 (Saint-Saëns); Symphonic Variations (Franck); Piano Concerto No. 1 (Tchaikovsky); Piano Concerto No. 1 (Rachmaninoff), Piano Concerto No. 2 (Rachmaninoff) or Rhapsody on a Theme of Paganini; Piano Concerto No. 1 (Prokofiev) or Piano Concerto No. 3 (Prokofiev); Piano Concerto No. 2 (MacDowell); Concerto in F (Gershwin) or Rhapsody in Blue; Symphony No. 1 (Shostakovich) or Symphony No. 2 (Shostakovich).

== Bibliography ==
- Hill, Brad (2006). American Popular Music Classical. New York, NY: Facts on File. ISBN 9780816069767.
- Siek, Stephen (2016). A Dictionary for the Modern Pianist. London, UK: Rowman & Littlefield Publishers. ISBN 9780810888807.
