= Ulster Performing Arts Center =

- Broadway Theater, Community Theater
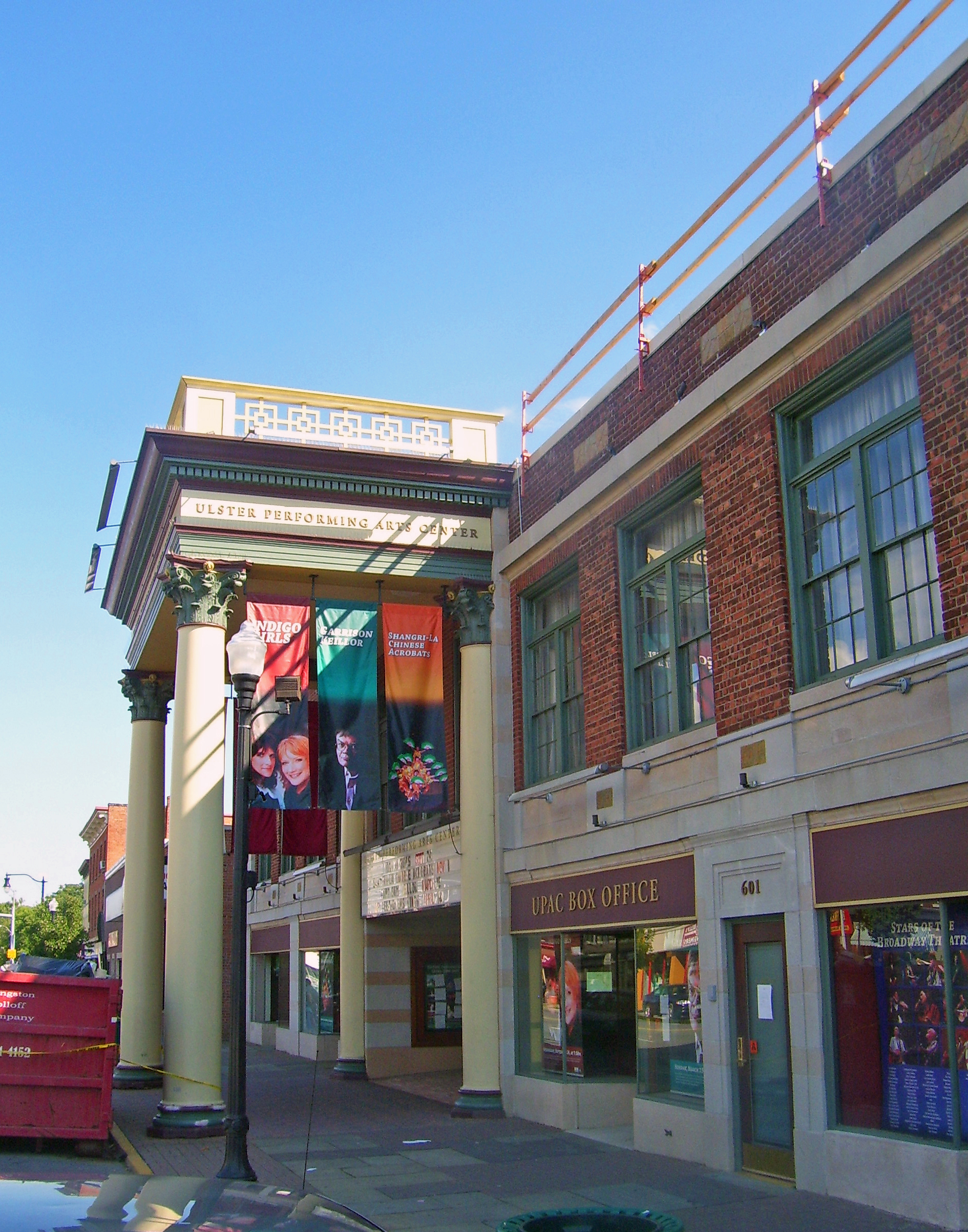
- Front portico of theater, viewed from west, 2008
- Interactive map of Ulster Performing Arts Center
- Address: 601 Broadway; Kingston, NY; USA
- Owner: Bardavon/UPAC Theaters
- Capacity: 1,500
- Type: Movie palace/vaudeville
- Designation: NRHP #79001639
- Current use: Musical performances

Construction
- Opened: 1927
- Reopened: 2002
- Architect: Douglas P. Hall

Tenant
- Hudson Valley Philharmonic

Website
- www.bardavon.org/

The Ulster Performing Arts Center (UPAC), originally the Broadway Theater and Community Theatre, is located on Broadway in Kingston, New York, United States. A Classical Revival building built in 1926, it is the only unaltered pre-World War II theater left in the city, and one of only three from that era in the Hudson Valley. It is also the largest proscenium theater between Manhattan and Albany.

It was listed on the National Register of Historic Places in 1979, two years after it was closed due to declining business. Since 2006, it has been operated by the Bardavon Theater in nearby Poughkeepsie. While it served primarily as a movie palace in its earlier incarnation, today it primarily hosts musical performances. The Hudson Valley Philharmonic calls it home due to its superior acoustics, and many popular recording artists have made UPAC a stop on their concert tours.

== Building ==
The theater is on a half-acre (2,000 m²) lot on the south side of Broadway in the center of the city, midway between its uptown and downtown sections. Broadway is mainly commercial; the neighborhoods behind the theater are residential.

=== Exterior ===
At the street, its northeast (main) facade is two stories high by 11 bays wide. The rear, theater portion rises three to four stories, dominating the block. The entire building is made of brick, with a granite-capped parapet with Aztec designs along the front roofline.

Plain granite pilasters mark the corners. The portico features four Corinthian columns and a classical entablature. Other decoration includes projecting stone belt-courses, granite rectangles between the windows, vertical stretchers above windows and granite aprons below.

=== Interior ===
The interior is built around the auditorium. It is semicircular, with an orchestra pit below the stage. The main seats and balcony provide 1,500 seats. The stage itself is 76 feet (23 m) wide and 33 feet (10 m) deep.

The proscenium arch, rising to 40 feet (12 m) above the stage floor, is decorated with alternating octagons, foliated candelabras and other foliate motifs. On either side it has fluted Corinthian pilasters and engaged columns with Adamesque carvings in the surrounding walls. It is topped by a highly detailed entablature, its cornice decorated with lions' heads, anthemion leaves, dentils and egg-and-dart molding. The frieze features steer skulls, candelabras, shields and swag.

Similar decoration continues on the shallow ceiling dome. It is coffered, with plain and decorated grillwork and solid recessed panels with dentils, anthemion leaves and other foliate molding. Rosettes mark the interstices. Around the central recess is a wide band with urns, rosettes and cartouches bordered by rinceau and foliate triangles. The rim has lions' heads and anthemion. The plaster walls are less decorated, using only simple rectangles.

The inner lobby has decoration incorporating both the same themes as the auditorium and the Aztec motifs outside. The second-floor lounge continues this mix, with a fireplace surrounded by carved stone. Other areas, such as the outer lobby, restrooms, and dressing rooms, are plain.

== History ==
The theater's history begins in 1925, when a Kingston couple and an Albany man incorporated with $5,300 ($97,000 in contemporary dollars). The next year they acquired the land and began selling bonds to raise more money. They hired prominent New York City architect Douglas P. Hall. That October, construction began with Sinner and Cook, also of New York, as general contractor.

Construction continued through the winter. The largest derrick in the state at that time was used to put the steel framing in place for the auditorium and proscenium arch. Upon its grand opening in June 1927 as the Broadway Theatre the Daily Freeman called it "one of the finest theatres in the Hudson River Valley". The program shown to the capacity crowd of 1,703 included five vaudeville acts and Howard Hawks' comedy The Cradle Snatchers. The ushers wore Spanish costumes to complement the decor. A schedule of three daily performances began the next day.

By 1947 it had changed owners three times. The Walter Reade organization bought it that year and renamed it the Community Theatre. Six years later, in 1953, the front portico was added. Inside, the original floor seats were replaced and a party box added, reducing the capacity to 1,560.

The theater continued to be a major part of the city's cultural life. Bette Davis and Lillian Gish were among the actors who performed on stage. Musical greats included Isaac Stern and Victor Borge, who praised the theater's acoustics.

Kingston's downtown began to decline with growing suburbanization in the 1970s. In 1977 the Reade organization closed the theater, citing competition for moviegoers from suburban shopping malls with multiple screens. To avert the building's possible demolition, a nonprofit organization, the Ulster Performing Arts Center, was formed and bought the theater.

In 1995, the nonprofit raised the money for a $1.7 million renovation, completed in time for the building's 75th anniversary in 2002. The Bardavon began managing UPAC in 2006 and the two organizations merged the following year.

== See also ==
- National Register of Historic Places listings in Ulster County, New York
