= William Strongin =

Rabbi William M. Strongin is an author, former Director of Jewish Studies at State University of New York at New Paltz, and previously a spiritual leader at Kehillat Ahavat Achim, a Jewish congregation in New Paltz. Strongin received a BA at Stony Brook University, a MTS at Harvard, and a MAHL and DDiv from the Reconstructionist Rabbinical College in Wyncote, Pennsylvania.

Strongin has written articles and book reviews in magazines, newspapers, and scholarly journals. In his article "Contemplating the Nature of Evil", Strongin describes evil as a necessary component of all human beings: on one hand, evil seeks to destroy us, but on the other hand, it also helps us grow and evolve as beings.
