= Nancy Kassop =

American political scientist

Nancy Kassop is a SUNY Distinguished Professor at the State University of New York at New Paltz, and former chair of the Political Science Department at the school. Some of the courses she teaches are American Government and Politics and Constitutional Law.

== Biography ==
Kassop graduated from the University of Pennsylvania with a B.A. in political science and earned her Ph.D. and M.A. in political science from New York University. She earned her college preparatory diploma from Friends Academy in Locust Valley, New York.

Her research focuses on constitutional law and the presidency. Among her many articles and publications is "Expansion and Contraction: Clinton's Impact on the Scope of Presidential Power" in The Presidency and the Law: The Clinton Legacy (University Press of Kansas, 2002, edited by Adler and Genovese) and "A Political Question By Any Other Name: Government Strategy in the Enemy Combatant Cases of Hamdi and Padilla" in The Political Question Doctrine and the Supreme Court of the United States (Lexington Books, 2007, edited by Mourtada-Saba). During the GW Bush and Obama administration, her focus was on presidential war powers and national security law. Some of her research explores the role of the Obama administration's political staff and the White House Counsel's office in making counterterrorism policy. Her current research is on the role of the White House Counsel, aided by interviews with former Counsels through the White House Transition Project (https://whitehousetransitionproject.org/wp-content/uploads/2024/03/WHTP-28-Counsel.pdf) and the Presidential Oral History Program at the Miller Center at the University of Virginia (https://millercenter.org/the-presidency/presidential-oral-histories). Her most recent work analyzes the relationship between the White House and the Department of Justice (https://papers.ssrn.com/sol3/papers.cfm?abstract_id=4872676).

== Personal life ==
Kassop was born April 1, 1950, in Glen Cove, New York to Joyce and Lionel Goldberg.
