= Marco DaSilva =

- Born: New York City, New York U.S.
- Education: State University of New York at New Paltz (BFA)
- Known for: Painting, drawing
- Website: MarcoDaSilva.net

Marco DaSilva is Brazilian-American multimedia artist, primary working in painting and drawing. His work integrates a personal symbology amidst explorations of his multi-racial, queer and manic experience.

== Early life and education ==
DaSilva was born and raised in New York City. He attended SUNY New Paltz where he received a BFA in Painting and Drawing.

== Career ==
DaSilva experienced a manic episode in June 2013, characterized by feelings of grandeur, prophetic destiny and extreme joy. Although, the episode was followed by a subsequent feeling of depression, the overall experience facilitated the birth of a meticulous painting process which DaSilva employed for much of the latter 2010's. Notably, DaSilva began to blend the application of house paint, limited color and sharpie markers through a pop context to canvas and other surfaces. His work during this period was featured in solo and collaborative expositions, including No Reason To Be Careful at New York's Bureau of General Services—Queer Division and Galeria del Barrio, I.M.A.G.E. Gallery, Heath Gallery and The Samuel Dorsky Museum of Art, among others.

NYFA selected DaSilva for its spring 2017 Artists as Entrepreneur Boot Camp for Artists of Color fellowship. Later that year, he also participated in the Queer Art Mentorship (QAM) under the mentorship of textile artist Liz Collins. He featured a series of self-portrait photo prints, “Of Water (A Sereia),” “Of Land (O Homem),” and “Of Sky (O Sol),” in QAM's annual exhibition, Here & Not Yet. Inspired by La Loteria, a Mexican card game of chance, DaSilva reimagined the Tarot-esque cards with images depicting his own genderqueer future possibilities.

In the summer of 2018, DaSilva traveled to Rio de Janeiro, Brazil, to explore his Brazilian heritage. The experience translated into a series of murals exhibited in 2019 at Manhattan’s Abrons Arts Center entitled Em Casa: Brazilian Cutlery. The collection invoked Brazilian spirituality and cultural through color palettes, textures, and shapes and particular use of bright neon color.

The Hudson Valley LGBTQ Community Center featured DaSilva's work in an exhibition entitled Entre Espacios (The Spaces Between) in 2019. He also showcased a collection of paintings—each created in the shape of the Empire State Building and representing a past lover—at New York's Manny Cantor Center during this time.

DaSilva's paintings have been featured on TBS's The Last OG as well as the independent film Small Engine Repair.

DaSilva is an Artist-in-Residence for the 2021 season at The Arts Center at Governors Island.

He maintains an active studio in Brooklyn.

== Exhibitions ==
=== Solo and two person exhibitions ===
- 2019: Plum Benefits, New York, NY
- 2019: Manny Cantor Center, New York, NY
- 2019: Abrons Arts Center, New York, NY
- 2019: Galeria del Barrio, New York, NY
- 2018: The Bureau of General Services – Queer Division, New York, NY
- 2017: A.J. Muste Institute, New York, NY
