= Liz Collins =

American fibers fine artist and fashion designer

- Born: 1968 (age 57–58)
- Education: Rhode Island School of Design
- Occupations: Artist and designer

Liz Collins (born 1968) is an American contemporary artist and designer. She is recognized for her artwork involving fabric, knitwear, and textiles, as well as for the fashion label she developed. She has expertise in textile media, including the transition of fabric into multi-dimensional forms as a method to vary the scale of her pieces to make them architectural and inviting rather than object-based. Collins is based in Brooklyn, New York.

== Early life and education ==
Liz Collins graduated with a Bachelor of Fine Arts degree (1991) and a Master of Fine Arts degree (1999) from the Rhode Island School of Design (RISD). Collins launched her personal knitwear clothing line in 1999 as her master's thesis at RISD and ran her business until 2004.

She was a professor of textiles at RISD from 2003 to 2013.

== Career ==
After receiving her MFA, Collins spent the next several years developing her own knitwear company until 2004. Recognized for its innovative design, Collins developed a patent for her specialized technique of interweaving and assembling different materials to construct her garments. The label gained popularity, celebrity recognition, and media coverage. Collins became a member of the Council of Fashion Designers of America in 1999 from her personal brand. In the middle stages of her fashion design career, she could no longer afford to finance her label's labor wages and meet society's demand for product. Collins soon began to outsource her products, which is when she felt disconnected from her creative process and missed the hands-on aspect of designing garments.

Once the fashion label closed, Collins then returned to RISD to teach textiles as an associate professor until 2013. She has also taught at the School of the Art Institute of Chicago, Moore College of Art, Pratt Institute, the Maryland Institute College of Art, and Parsons School of Design. In 2017, Collins served as a mentor to Marco DaSilva in Queer Art's Fellowship program. Art Review describes her as "at once warm, carefree and unpredictable, simultaneously inviting and disarm; they enact an effortless embrace of the everyday, as well as a tightly orchestrated celebration of an oblique and open-ended personal cosmology."

== "Knit-Grafting" ==
"Knit-Grafting" is a term created by Liz Collins that is used to describe her artistic process of reconstructing garments and is most specifically used in her work as a fashion designer. This term stemmed from the fundamentals of Grafting, which is the process of intertwining two or more fabrics together. Collin's Knit-Grafting incorporates numerous panels of fabrics as well as fusing various materials. These materials may include Lace, Metals, and other media used to make her design stand out.

=== Knitting Nation ===
As a response to the fashion industry she previously worked within, Collins launched Knitting Nation (KN). KN was a multi-part installation and performance project that spanned several years and was globally spread. It was a site-specific installation with collaborative performance that revealed some facets of the textile and apparel manufacturing processes by demonstrating costumed seamstresses manually working on knitting machines. This work aimed to bring awareness to topics such as sexuality and gender within fashion, labor, and the issue of sustainable practices through immersive, visual means. Crafting is filled with power hierarchies and gender nuances that are centered around the LGBTQ+ culture as fiber-based crafts like embroidery, knitting, and sewing examine the numerous preferences of society and raise reactions of those disapproving. More specifically, Knitting Nation Phase 4 was titled "Pride" to admire and acknowledge the original rainbow flag of the LGBTQ+ Community. This installation was a hand-knit rainbow flag that was displayed at the front and center steps of a park in Providence, Rhode Island, for six hours. Collins is described as "wrestling with the fabric of the flag as an icon of pride and invites us to demand more of gay and lesbian activists."

=== Other work ===
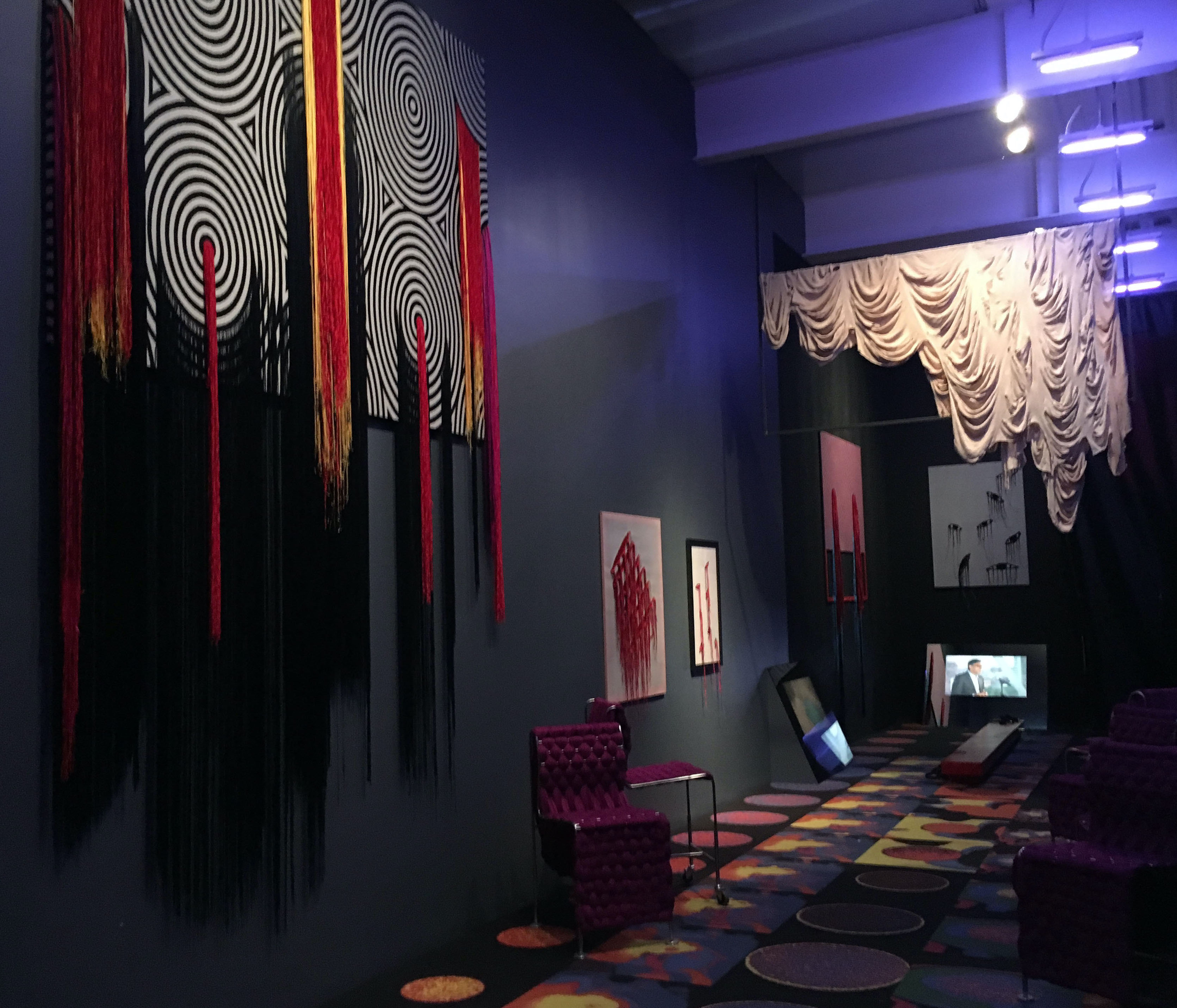
Installation view of Liz Collins' Cave of Secrets in the exhibit Trigger: Gender as a Tool and a Weapon at the New Museum, 2017

Other artwork by Liz Collins incorporates recycled textiles from previous art pieces, abstract designs, and structural components like poles and fences. These pieces typically entertain a diverse color palette and explore themes such as human interconnectedness and cosmic energy. Her work exists on a plane of varying sizes, from intimate, fibrous wall hangings to life-size installations that transport the audience to a temporary alternative universe. Collins emphasizes interactive multi-media art that embodies various textures, scents, and colors in the materials to help make the audience's experiences multi-sensory.

In 2005, Collins initiated a collaboration between 18 of her RISD students and the Italian Trade Commission with American designer Donna Karan. Together, they reimagined the "cozy," which is a hybrid sweater that was one of DKNY's best sellers. The project was displayed at DKNY's flagship store on Madison Avenue, and gave the students valuable experience and exposure.

In 2018, Collins was invited to collaborate on Between Inside and Outside, a project in October 2018 in Slovenia. The project was created to mark the 15th anniversary of the Oloop group, and was part of a city engagement project.

Collins also contributed to "Flutter" in 2019, Chris Dawson's immersive installation in Los Angeles, along with 14 other contemporary artists.

In 2022, Collins was commissioned to create the installation Every Which Way (2022) for Meta's Manhattan office complex in the historic James A. Farley Building.

In 2024, Collins had two works on display in Venice, Italy, in an exhibition curated by Adriano Pedrosa.

== Exhibitions ==
=== Solo exhibitions ===
- 2005: Knoxville Museum of Art, Knoxville, Tennessee
- 2006: RISD, Providence, Rhode Island
- 2008: Rhode Island School of Design Museum, Providence, Rhode Island
- 2011: Institute of Contemporary Art, Boston, Boston, Massachusetts
- 2011: Institute of Contemporary Art, Boston, Boston, Massachusetts
- 2012: Museum of Modern Art (MoMA), New York City
- 2016: Museum of Art and Design (MAD), New York City – featuring a time-based performance and installation
- 2025: Liz Collins: Motherlode, RISD, Providence, Rhode Island

== Collections ==
Collins has public collections in museums and gallery spaces across the country, which include the Museum of Arts & Design in New York, New York; the FIT Museum in New York, New York; the RISD Museum in Providence, Rhode Island; the Tang Museum in Saratoga Springs, New York; the Leslie-Lohmann Museum of Art in New York, New York; and the School of Art Institute of Chicago and the Fashion Resource Center in Chicago, Illinois.

== Awards ==
- United States Artist Target Fellowship, 2006
- MacColl Johnson Fellowship, 2011
- CeCArtsLink Grant with intentions to produce a Knitting Nation installation in Croatia.
- Anonymous Was a Woman Award, 2023
