= Randall Craig Fleischer =

American conductor (1958–2020)

Randall Craig Fleischer (1958 – August 19, 2020) was an American conductor. He was the music director of the Hudson Valley Philharmonic, Anchorage Symphony, and Youngstown Symphony orchestras.

== Biography ==
Fleischer studied with Leonard Bernstein as a conducting fellow at Tanglewood in 1989. He served as the Assistant Conductor of the American Symphony Orchestra from 1986 to 1989. While working toward his Master of Music degree at the Indiana University School of Music, he served as chorus master of the Indiana University Opera Theater program from 1983 to 1985. Fleischer received his Bachelor of Music Education from the Oberlin Conservatory of Music and studied conducting privately with Otto-Werner Mueller and in Master classes with Seiji Ozawa, Riccardo Muti, Gustav Meier, and others.

Fleischer appeared as a guest conductor with many major orchestras in the United States and internationally including repeat engagements with the Israel Philharmonic, Los Angeles Philharmonic, San Francisco Symphony, St. Paul Chamber Orchestra, Seattle Symphony, Utah Symphony, San Diego Symphony, Philadelphia Chamber Orchestra and others.

Fleischer first came to international attention when, while serving his first of five years as Assistant, then Associate conductor of the National Symphony Orchestra, he conducted Dvorak’s Cello Concerto with Mstislav Rostropovich as soloist during the NSO’s 1990 tour of Japan and the U.S.S.R. This was the first time Rostropovich had played the cello in Russia since his forced exile in 1972. Fleischer was featured in the internationally broadcast PBS documentary “Soldier of Music” which documented Rostropovich’s return to the Soviet Union and was also featured on the 60 Minutes segment on this event. “Soldier of Music” was later released on the Sony Video label.

In 1995 Fleischer made his debut with New York City Opera conducting The Magic Flute. Fleischer’s operatic repertoire included productions of La Bohème, Turandot, Tosca, Madama Butterfly, Don Giovanni, La Traviata, and others.

Active as a composer, Fleischer was a national leader in the area of symphonic rock and world music fusion. Pioneering these new and growing genres, he worked with artists such as John Densmore (The Doors), Natalie Merchant, Blondie, Ani DiFranco, John Cale (Velvet Underground), Garth Hudson (The Band), Kenny Rogers, and Native American artists R. Carlos Nakai, Burning Sky, The Hawk Project, The Benally Family, and others. As an advocate of new music, Fleischer commissioned and conducted world premieres and works by living composers.

An educator, Fleischer co-authored several instructional pieces for children in collaboration with his wife, comedian Heidi Joyce, which were premiered by the National Symphony Orchestra, including three rap pieces for orchestra. In January 1991, Joyce and Fleischer co-authored and premiered Martin Luther King, Jr.: A Spiritual Journey with the NSO, a piece for narrator and orchestra which explores the history of the civil rights movement with excerpts of King’s speeches, narrated for King’s daughter, Yolanda King. This piece was broadcast on PBS in February 1995.

Fleischer co-created with Rob Evan Rocktopia, a mix of classical music and classic rock, which in March 2018 began a six-week run at the Broadway Theatre. Its featured vocalists include; Evan, Alyson Cambridge, Chloe Lowery, Kimberly Nichole, and Tony Vincent, as well as Celtic violinist Máiréad Nesbitt, guitarist Tony Bruno, a 5-piece rock band, a 20-piece orchestra, and a 40-member choir.

== Death ==
Randall Craig Fleischer died on August 19, 2020, at his home in Los Angeles at the age of 61.
