= Claude Monteux =

American flutist and conductor (1920–2013)

Claude Monteux (October 15, 1920 – February 22, 2013) was an American flutist and conductor. Born in Brookline, Massachusetts, the son of conductor Pierre Monteux, Monteux studied flute with Georges Laurent, then the principal flutist of the Boston Symphony Orchestra. He studied conducting with his father, both privately and at the Monteux School for conductors.

As a flutist, Monteux played under the batons of Arturo Toscanini, Bruno Walter, Thomas Beecham, Leopold Stokowski, Pablo Casals, Igor Stravinsky, and his father. As a conductor, he served as music director of the Columbus Symphony Orchestra (1953–1956) and the Hudson Valley Philharmonic (1959–1975).

Monteux taught summer courses at the Pierre Monteux School for conductors in Maine and was affiliated with the San Diego State University School of Music and Dance. Monteux served on the faculties of the New England Conservatory of Music, the Peabody Conservatory, Vassar College and Ohio State University. He made commercial recordings for such labels as London and Phillips, including works by Mozart and Bach with the Academy of St Martin in the Fields.

Monteux had two children from his first marriage; Kirk and Alain Monteux (deceased). He also had three children from his third marriage to Adeline Johanna Schulz Hiatt Peake. Their marriage ended in divorce. His son, Robert, was born in 1952 in Yonkers, New York and is a former professional ballet dancer. His daughter, Sylvia Monteux, was born in 1954 in Bar Harbor, Maine and died in 2024 in Ellsworth, Maine. His son Gerard, was born in Columbus, Ohio in 1955, and is a television sports host and nature photographer under the professional name of William (Bill) Patrick, as well as a board member of the Pierre Monteux School. His fourth marriage was to the former Mary Ann Cahn, a flutist who had two children from a previous marriage. His grandson Kirk Monteux, born in 1965, is a composer. His granddaughter Jessica Lynn Fitzsimmons was born in 1982. Monteux was widowed upon the death of his wife Mary Ann.
