= Ole Windingstad =

Norwegian conductor, pianist and composer

Ole Windingstad (May 18, 1886 – June 3, 1959) was a Norwegian conductor, pianist and composer. He was the conductor of the Scandinavian Symphony Orchestra in Brooklyn, New York and the Hudson Valley Philharmonic. His most notable symphonic composition was The Tide.

== Biography ==
Ole Windingstad was born in Sandefjord, Norway. At age 14, he studied at the Music Conservatory in Oslo, Norway and three years later in Leipzig Germany . There he studied piano, organ, composition and conducting. In 1905 he traveled to the United States. He settled in New York in 1906. Ole Windingstad married Anna Hansen. They had five children: Solveig, Alf, Edgar, Jane and Arthur. Solveig, Alf and Jane died of Spanish flu in 1918, and Edgar died in a traffic accident in 1959. In 1926 he was appointed Knight to the Royal Norwegian Order of St. Olav for his work with Norwegian music in America.

Ole Windingstad's most important musical work was a symphony called The Tides, which was composed in 1936 and first performed in Albany in 1938. The Tides was also played in New Orleans in 1941. During his tour as conductor in 1955, Ole Windingstad also performed the piece at the Aula University in Oslo Norway. He was conducting a concert with the Dutchess County Symphony in Poughkeepsie, New York when he suffered a heart attack, and later died in Kingston, on June 3, 1959, at age 73.

=== Scandinavian Symphony Orchestra ===
Also known as the Nordmændenes Sangforening, the Scandinavian Symphony Orchestra was based in Brooklyn, New York. In the period from 1913 to 1939, Ole Windingstad led the Scandinavian Symphony Orchestra but also led many other choral, orchestral, and operatic groups in the New York area. Ole Windingstad also kept an open relationship with musical organizations from Norway. He may have guest conducted the Oslo Philharmonic. After a notable performance The New York Times reported on March 26, 1916:

Under the auspices of the American-Scandinavian Society, a concert of music of the northern countries was given at Carnegie Hall last night. Those who took part included Marie Sundelius, soprano; Albert Lindqvist, bass; Herman Sandby, cellist; the Scandinavian Symphony Orchestra with Ole Windingstad as conductor, and a male chorus of 150 voices. The evening offered much that was valuable and the additional appeal of being out of the ordinary.

=== New Orleans Philharmonic Society ===
Ole Windingstad conducted the New Orleans Philharmonic from 1940 to 1944.

=== Hudson Valley Philharmonic ===
In 1945 Ole Windingstad was hired by George Hagstrom one of the founders of the Hudson Valley Philharmonic. On October 29, 1953 Ole Windingstad and the orchestra presented a program of two Norwegian composers, Grieg Olsen and Carl Gustav Sparre Olsen at New York's Carnegie Hall. During Ole Windingstad's tenure the orchestra presented Prokofiev's Peter and the Wolf which was narrated by former first lady Eleanor Roosevelt.
