= Lew Brownstein =

American historian, author, and professor

Lewis Jacqueline Brownstein is a historian, author, and professor along with being the former Chair of the Political Science and International Relations Department at SUNY New Paltz. His main speciality of expertise is on the region of the Middle East more specifically but not limited to the Israeli/Palestinian conflict. Lew Brownstein earned his Ph.D. from the School for Advanced International Studies at Johns Hopkins University in 1969. One of his biggest accomplishments besides his work published are the lectures he gives on a wide range of topics involving international affairs in various areas around the world.

== Personal life ==
Lew Brownstein was born on October 1, 1938, in New York to Frances (Mayers) and Isidore Brownstein. Lew Brownstein is of Ashkenazi Jewish ancestry through both sides of his family. Isidore Brownstein was Russian Jewish and immigrated to the Bronx at a young age. Frances Mayers was the daughter of Benjamin F. Mayers and Regina Amster. Frances was of Austrian Jewish and Hungarian Jewish heritage.
