= Imre Palló (conductor) =

Hungarian-born conductor (born 1941)

Imre Palló (born 15 May 1941, Budapest, Hungary) is a Hungarian-born conductor. His father, Imre Palló, was the leading baritone of the Budapest State Opera for 50 years, and also director of the company from 1956–1960. The composer Zoltán Kodály was an intimate friend of the Palló family, and was his godfather, playing a very influential role in his early musical training and education. He studied with Hans Swarowsky at the Vienna Academy of Music, and privately with Ferenc Fricsay. He served as Fricsay's personal assistant at the Salzburg Summer Festival, and also as the assistant to Herbert von Karajan and Karl Böhm at the Salzburg and Vienna Festivals from 1961–1964. He was also the assistant to Antal Dorati for the Haydn recordings with the Philharmonica Hungarica for the Decca label.

== Biography ==
He made his American debut with the National Symphony Orchestra in Washington D.C. in 1973. He was the music director of the Hudson Valley Philharmonic in New York State from 1976–1991. He also served as conductor at the Wuppertal Opera (1964-1968), Deutsche Opera am Rhein, Düsseldorf (1968-1972), and as the principal guest conductor at the New York City Opera (1974-1989) and the Frankfurt Opera (1989-1992).

In 1979, he conducted the Naumburg Orchestral Concerts, in the Naumburg Bandshell, Central Park, in the summer series.

As a guest conductor, he has worked with the Israel Philharmonic, Los Angeles Philharmonic, Dortmund Philharmonic, Budapest Philharmonic, Bavarian State Orchestra Munich, Budapest Symphony Orchestra of the Hungarian Radio and Television, Orchestre Philharmonique de Luxembourg, Staatskapelle Weimar, Brooklyn Philharmonic, Lisbon Radio Orchestra, Columbus Symphony, New Jersey Symphony, Edmonton Symphony and Orchestra Victoria in Melbourne Australia. He has also led opera productions with the Canadian Opera Company, Cincinnati Opera, Cleveland Opera, Connecticut Opera, Pittsburgh Opera, Philadelphia Opera, Portland Opera, St. Louis Opera, San Francisco Opera, Washington Opera, Vancouver Opera, Manitoba Opera, New Israeli Opera, Den Norske Opera Oslo, De Vlaamse Opera Antwerp, Budapest State Opera, Badisches Staatstheater Karlsruhe, Berlin State Opera, Leipzig Opera, Deutsches Nationaltheater Weimar, West Australian Opera (Perth) and Opera Australia.

Imre Pallo was also professor of Music at the Indiana University School of Music from 1994–2006, and Chair of the Instrumental Conducting at the Indiana University School of Music from 1998–2006. Thereafter, he was professor, Pro-Dean and Chair of Conducting and Opera Production at the Sydney Conservatorium of Music (University of Sydney) from 2006–2012. He currently lives in Venice, Florida and is the interim conductor and Music Director of the Venice Symphony. He inaugurated the International Conducting Academy, May 16–21, 2016 at the Venice Performing Arts Center.
