= Hudson Valley Philharmonic =

Hudson Valley Philharmonic (HVP)
- Orchestra
- Former name: Dutchess County Philharmonic Orchestra
- Founded: 1932
- Location: Poughkeepsie, New York
- Principal conductor: Vacant

The Hudson Valley Philharmonic (abbreviated HVP) is a symphony orchestra based in Poughkeepsie, New York in the United States. It began in 1932 and serves the Hudson Valley region.

The philharmonic offers a series of concert performances at the Bardavon 1869 Opera House in Poughkeepsie as well as the Ulster Performing Arts Center in Kingston.

The orchestra has made guest appearances at SUNY New Paltz’s Piano Summer and the Bethel Woods Center for the Arts.

== History ==
In 1932, four Poughkeepsie businessmen who were also dedicated string players—George Hagstrom, Sydney Fleishman, Charles T. Miller and Dr. Charles Hoffman—formed the nucleus of local musicians that eventually evolved into the Dutchess County Philharmonic Orchestra (DCPO). With Hagstrom as its first conductor, the orchestra was made up of amateurs and professionals alike, plus a number of music students from surrounding high schools. In 1934, local backing enabled the DCPO to perform its first series of public concerts. By the 1940s, it had grown to 93 musicians. DCPO repertoire was largely classical, including some contemporary music and works by local composers.

In 1945, George Hagstrom stepped down as music director, handing the baton over to Ole Windingstad, formerly a conductor for the Oslo Philharmonic, Norway. On October 29, 1953, under his direction, the orchestra presented a program of two Norwegian composers, Grieg and Sparre-Olsen, at New York's Carnegie Hall. It was also during Windingstad's tenure that the orchestra presented Prokofiev's Peter and the Wolf, narrated by former first lady Eleanor Roosevelt.

By 1959, Claude Monteux, world-class flutist and son of conductor Pierre Monteux, had elevated the orchestra to a fully professional ensemble, renamed the Hudson Valley Philharmonic Society, Inc. The Young People's Concerts program offered today is a direct descendant of the school-day concerts introduced by Claude Monteux.

Imre Palló, formerly director of the German Opera on the Rhine and New York City Opera conductor, succeeded Claude Monteux as music director in 1976. Pallo introduced the first Hudson Valley Philharmonic opera series in 1978, and in 1979 established a pops series modeled after the successful Boston Pops.

Randall Craig Fleischer became the third music director of the HVP during the orchestra's 1992 season and held the position till his death in 2020. Under Fleischer's leadership, the orchestra evolved into one of the region's major performing arts and educational assets. During his tenure, a Juilliard teaching artist and affiliate of the New York Philharmonic redesigned the Young Peoples' concert program. Each year, the program provides thousands of regional school children with the opportunity to view orchestral concerts.

=== Subsidiary of the Bardavon ===
In 1998, the orchestra sustained a financial crisis, and in order to save the organization, local regional philanthropic foundations stated their willingness to commit substantial support provided the Bardavon would step in to reorganize and reinstate the orchestra. Both the New York State Legislature and private foundations aided the Bardavon to purchase the assets and name Hudson Valley Philharmonic, which officially occurred on June 3, 1999.

In March 2022, due to challenge with contract negotiations between the Bardavon and the Hudson Valley Philharmonic, the orchestra began to consider to legally separate from the Bardavon. Performances for the orchestra have been greatly reduced, to just three for the 2023–2024 season.

=== Hudson Valley Symphony Orchestra ===
Musicians from the HVP created the Hudson Valley Symphony Orchestra "revitalizing performances and educational programming" with their inaugural concert on May 18, 2024.

== Music Directors ==
1. George Hagstrom (1932–1945)
2. Ole Windingstad (1945–1959)
3. Claude Monteux (1959–1976)
4. Imre Palló (1976–1991)
5. Randall Craig Fleischer (1992–2020)
