= Bardavon 1869 Opera House =

- Collingwood Opera House and Office Building
- U.S. National Register of Historic Places
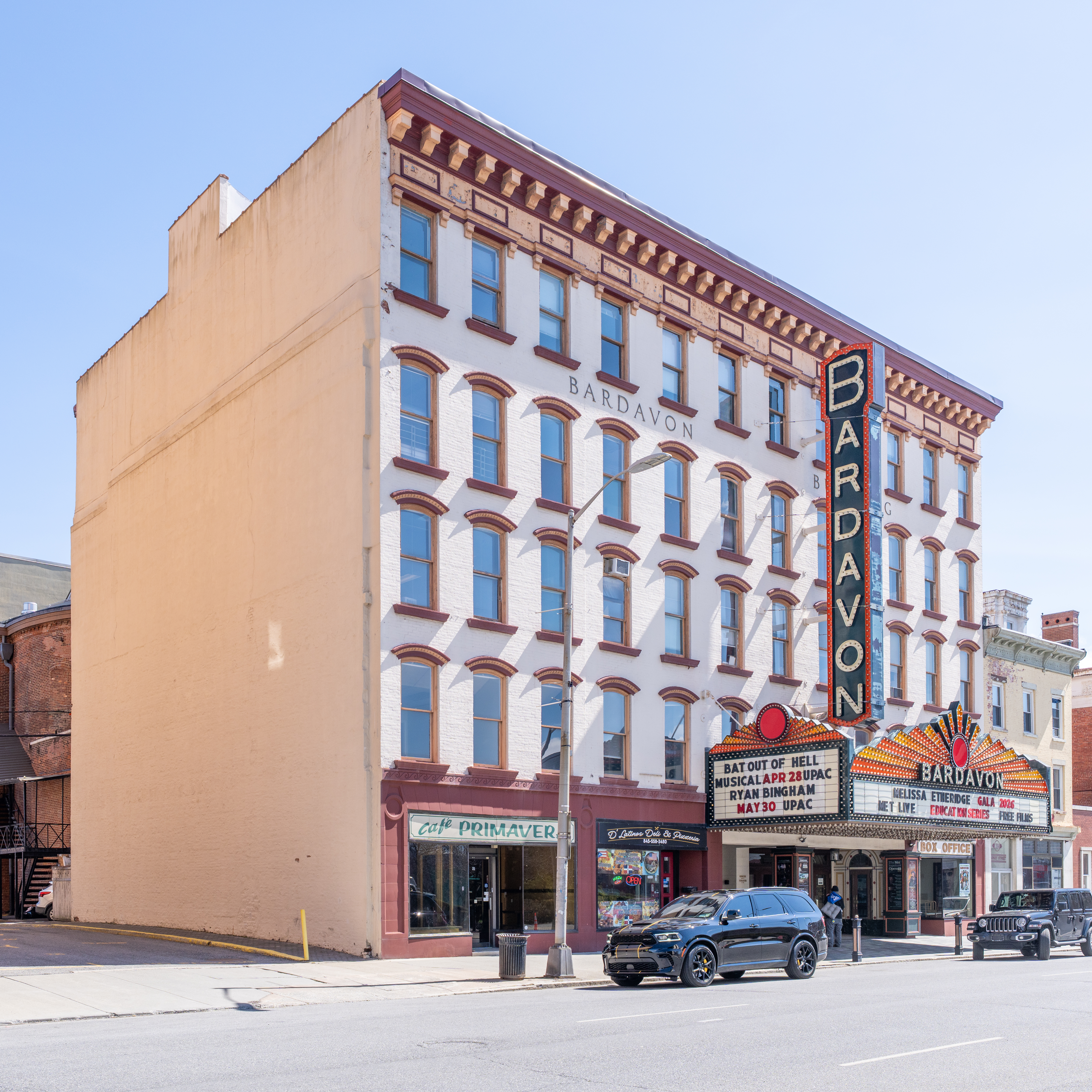
- Location: 35 Market Street, Poughkeepsie, United States
- Coordinates: 41°42′10.72″N 73°55′45.35″W
- Built: 1869
- Architect: J.A. Wood
- NRHP reference No.: 77000939
- Added to NRHP: October 20, 1977

The Bardavon 1869 Opera House /ˈbɑːrdəvɒn/, in the downtown district of Poughkeepsie, New York, United States, is the oldest continuously operating theater in New York State. Designed by J.A. Wood, it was built in 1869 and served as a venue for various performing arts, community meetings, and celebrations until 1923; it largely resumed this heritage by becoming a general performing-arts facility in 1976. In the interlude period from 1923 to 1975, it served as a cinema, although there were some live performances, especially vaudeville, during this period. Originally called the Collingwood Opera House after its owner and operator James Collingwood, the theater featured an unusual two-stage dome. Between 1869 and 1921, many notable figures of the day graced the Bardavon's stage, including Sarah Bernhardt and John Barrymore.

== History ==
The Bardavon was designed by prominent Poughkeepsie architect J. A. Wood and built by James Strang Post, the latter notable for designing or erecting architectural structures in the Poughkeepsie central business district and Vassar College. An extensive renovation was undertaken in 1905 and supervised by architect William Beardsley, who also designed the Dutchess County Court House and Attica state prison. The theater was not reopened until January 1, 1923, when it was opened under the new name The Bardavon Theater.

At that time, it was bought by Paramount, and in 1928 a Wurlitzer theatre pipe organ was added. This organ was removed in the mid-1960s and installed in a private residence in Scarsdale, NY until subsequent dismantling by a private collector, and placed in storage. It is most likely the theater where cult film director Edward D. Wood Jr. served as an usher in his youth, although sources do not often specify the Bardavon by name. In 1947, the theater was further modernized and a movie marquee added. The style of the interior after the renovation has been described as neo-classic.

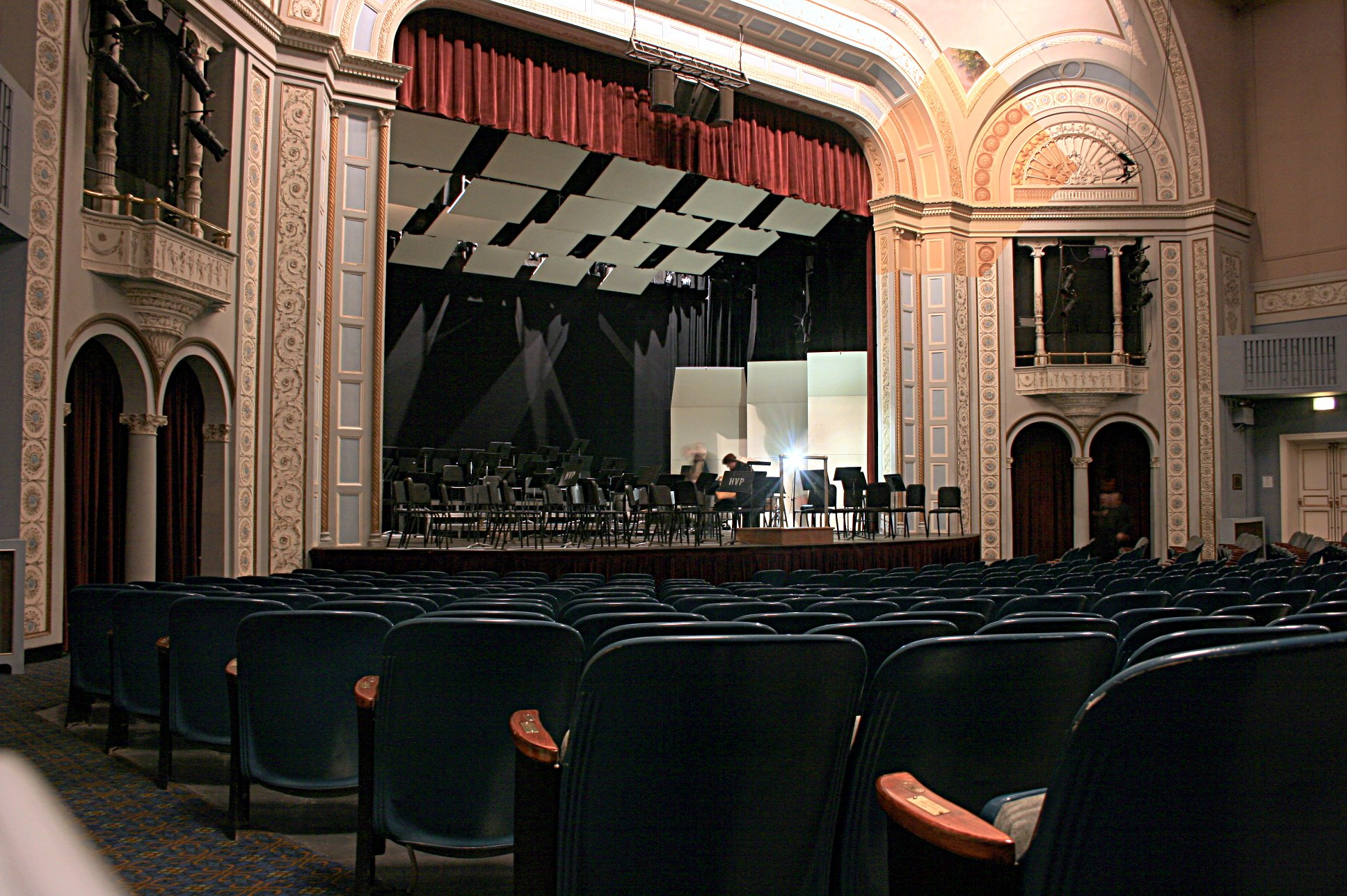
View of the stage

The venue continued as a cinema up until 1975, when massive redevelopment of the downtown area threatened it with demolition. Sitting where it does, it was near-adjacent to the site of the new Civic Center and a proposed arterial highway project. There were plans to raze the building and use the site for a parking lot. Concerned citizens banded together to save the theater and were successful in getting it named to the National Register of Historic Places on August 20, 1977 — and renamed The Bardavon 1869 Opera House. Since then, over $5 million has been raised and used to partially renovate the Bardavon, which is now in use again as a venue for a broad range of performing arts including theater, dance, music, opera, and other genres. The original Wurlitzer pipe organ was discovered in 1983 by the New York Theatre Organ Society, www.nytos.org, and a deal was struck for the renovation and re-installation of the instrument with NYTOS as permanent curator holding ownership of the instrument.

The Bardavon has been the home of the Hudson Valley Philharmonic for over 40 years. In one notable 1953 performance, former First Lady Eleanor Roosevelt provided the narration for Prokofiev's Peter and the Wolf.

On 30 August 2020, The Bardavon 1869 Opera House offered a free online series entitled "Albums Revisited".

== Performances ==
=== Actors and musicians who have performed at the Bardavon and UPAC ===
- Al Pacino
- Andre Watts
- Ani DiFranco
- The Bacon Brothers
- Barenaked Ladies
- B.B. King
- Bela Fleck
- Bernie Williams (baseball player/guitarist)
- Bill Cosby
- Blondie
- Bob Dylan
- Bob Weir
- Bo Diddley
- Brad Mehldau
- Bruce Hornsby
- Buddy Guy
- Buffalo Bill
- Burning Spear
- Butch Miles
- Capitol Steps
- Carol Channing
- Cher
- Cherish the Ladies
- Chick Corea
- Chris Botti
- Chris Brubeck
- Chris Cornell
- Clint Black
- Cyndi Lauper
- Dan Zanes and Friends
- Dark Star Orchestra
- Dave Brubeck
- David Bromberg
- David Byrne
- David Crosby
- David Sedaris
- Derek Trucks
- Dickey Betts
- D.L. Hughley
- Don Mclean
- Dr. John
- Duke Robillard
- Eddie Izzard
- Eddie Palmieri
- Edie Brickell
- Eric Idle
- Ernest Borgnine
- The Four Seasons
- Frankie Valli
- Frank Sinatra
- Garrison Keillor
- Gary Burton
- George Carlin
- Gladys Knight
- Goo Goo Dolls
- Graham Nash
- Great Southern
- Gregg Allman
- Harry Belafonte
- Harry Chapin
- Harry Houdini
- Henny Youngman
- Henry Rollins
- Hot Tuna
- Ian Anderson
- Indigo Girls
- Itzhak Perlman
- The J. Geils Band
- Jerry Bergonzi
- Jimmy Cliff
- Jimmy Sturr
- Joan Armatrading
- Joan Baez
- Joe Jackson
- John Hiatt
- John Philip Sousa
- Jonny Lang
- Joshua Bell
- Kathy Griffin
- Kathy Mattea
- Keb' Mo'
- Kenny Loggins
- Keri Noble
- Ladysmith Black Mambazo
- Laurie Anderson
- Les Ballets Africains
- Lewis Black
- Linda Eder
- Liza Minnelli
- Lonestar
- Loretta Swit
- Los Lobos
- Los Lonely Boys
- Lou Rawls
- Lou Reed
- Lyle Lovett
- Madeleine Peyroux
- Mickey Hart
- Milton Berle
- Natalie Cole
- Natalie MacMaster
- Natalie Merchant
- North Mississippi Allstars
- OK Go
- Pat Benatar
- Pat Metheny
- Patti LaBelle
- Peru Negro
- Nexus
- Peter Frampton
- Pete Seeger
- Pixies
- Quartetto Gelato
- Queen Latifah
- Ralph Stanley
- Ramblin' Jack Elliott
- RatDog
- Richard Thompson
- Richie Havens
- Robert Cray
- Ron White
- Roy Hargrove
- Rufus Wainwright
- Ryan Adams
- Sarah McLachlan
- Sharon Isbin
- Shawn Colvin
- Sinéad O'Connor
- Smokey Robinson
- Steve Goodman
- Steve Martin
- Paul Winter
- Steven Wright
- Talking Heads
- Todd Rundgren
- Tom Hambridge
- Tony Bennett
- Whoopi Goldberg
- Wynton Marsalis
- "Weird Al" Yankovic
- Youssou N'Dour
- Yo-Yo Ma
- Zakir Hussain
- Paul Winter
- Zappa Plays Zappa

== Name by dates ==
- Collingwood Opera House: 1869–1921
- Bardavon Theater: 1923–1975
- Bardavon 1869 Opera House: 1976–present
