= Raimondo Borsellino =

Italian politician (1905–1998)

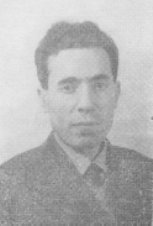
Raimondo Borsellino

Raimondo Borsellino (27 April 1905 – 26 December 1998) was an Italian politician. He was born in Cattolica Eraclea, and represented the Christian Democracy in the Constituent Assembly of Italy from 1946 to 1948 and in the Chamber of Deputies from 1948 to 1958.
