= Vladimir Feltsman =

Russian-American pianist

Vladimir Feltsman Владимир Фельцман
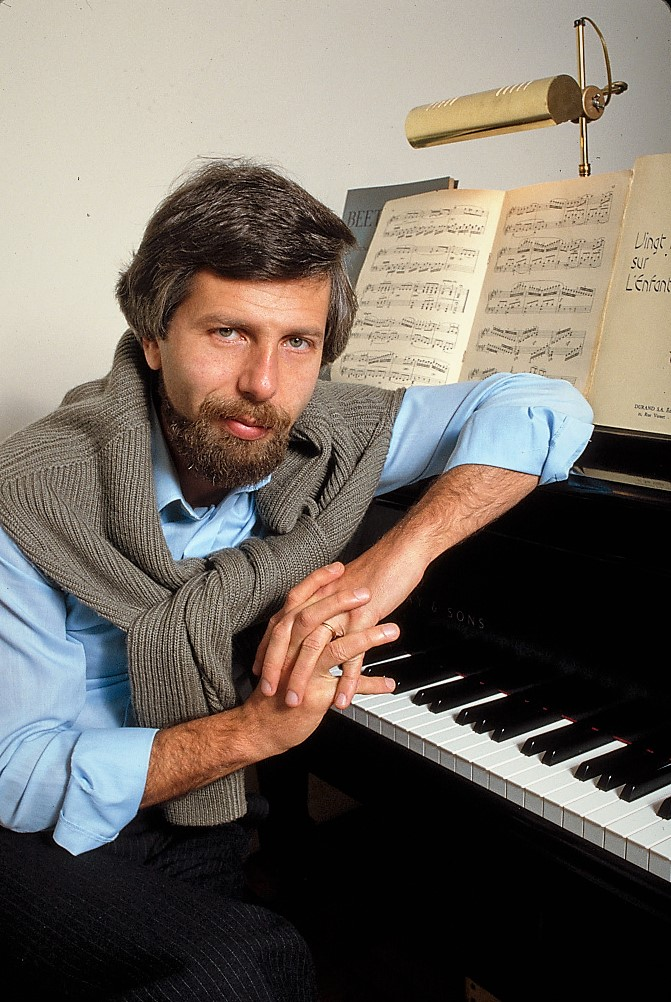
- Feltsman in New York, 1987

Background information
- Born: Vladimir Oskarovich Feltsman; 8 January 1952 (age 74); Moscow, Russia, Soviet Union
- Genres: Classical
- Occupation: Pianist
- Years active: 1963–Present
- Website: feltsman.com

Vladimir Oskarovich Feltsman (Russian: Владимир Оскарович Фельцман; born 8 January 1952) is a Russian-American classical pianist particularly noted for his devotion to the music of Johann Sebastian Bach and Frédéric Chopin.

== Background ==
Vladimir Oskarovich Feltsman was born on January 8, 1952, in Moscow. His father, the composer Oscar Feltsman, was known in the Soviet Union for popular songs and musical comedies.

Vladimir Feltsman debuted with the Moscow Philharmonic when he was eleven. He studied at the Moscow Tchaikovsky, Moscow, and Leningrad (now St. Petersburg) Conservatories. In 1971, he won the Grand Prix at the Marguerite Long International Piano Competition in Paris, followed by tours in the former Soviet Union, Europe, and Japan, thus beginning his adult career.

== Career ==
In 1979, because of his growing discontent with the official Soviet ideology and rigid governmental control of the arts, Feltsman applied for an exit visa from the Soviet Union. In response, he was immediately banned from performing in public. After eight years of struggle and virtual artistic exile, he was finally granted permission to leave the Soviet Union.

Arriving in the United States on August 18, 1987, Vladimir Feltsman found himself warmly greeted at the White House, where on September 27, 1987, he performed his very first concert in North America for U.S. President Ronald Reagan. On November 11, 1987, his performance at Carnegie Hall established him as a major pianist on the American scene. During his early years in the West, he was promoted as a Russian Romantic firebrand, yet his debut recital consisted of works by Schubert, Schumann and Messiaen. By the mid-1990s, he had devoted himself to Bach, offering expressively shaped and thoughtfully ornamented performances on a modern piano. Then he returned to the standard repertory — Haydn, Beethoven, Mussorgsky — in the big-toned, blockbuster-style that many had anticipated when he first arrived in the USA. He has been described by music critics as a master of reinventing himself.

Feltsman teaches at the Mannes College The New School for Music and the State University of New York New Paltz, where he is the founder and artistic director of the International Festival-Institute Piano Summer. Feltsman has turned to performances on the fortepiano; he has notably performed all of Mozart's piano sonatas on a fortepiano, as well as Beethoven's Emperor Concerto and Mozart's Concerto K595, No. 27. As his contribution to the Mozart anniversary year, he commissioned the keyboard builder Paul McNulty to construct a fortepiano modeled after an Anton Walter instrument from Mozart's time.

== Personal ==
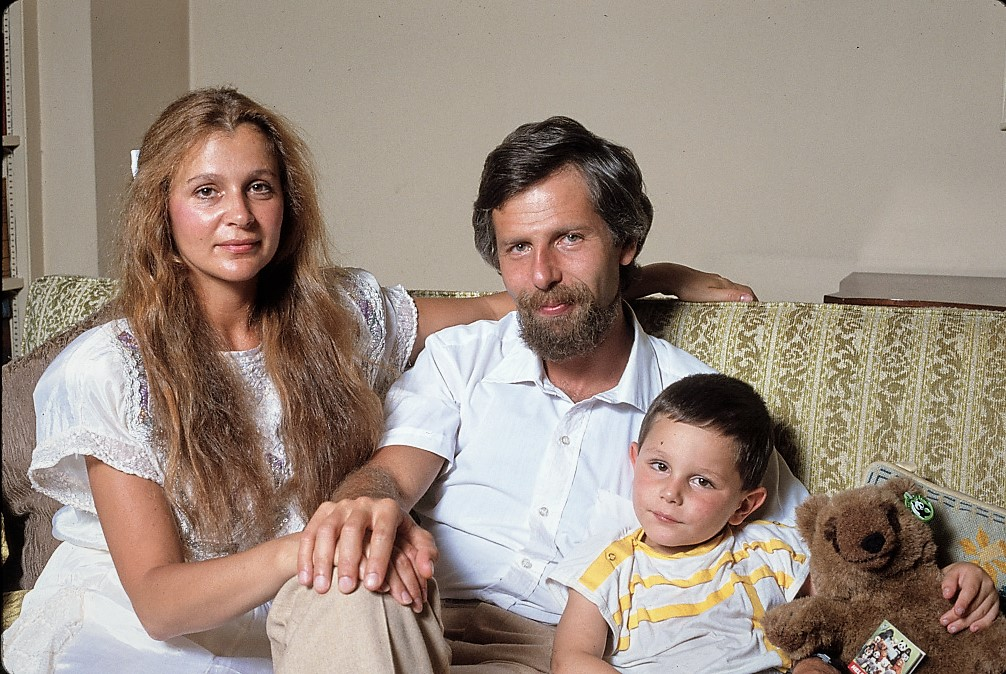
Feltsman in New York, with his first wife Anna and son Daniel, in 1987

He married a woman named Anna in 1977, and they had a son, Daniel, circa 1983. He was allowed to travel outside the Soviet Union after his marriage, though his wife was not allowed to accompany him, held as a de facto hostage so he would return.

In 1995, Feltsman became a U.S. citizen.

He lives in upstate New York with his Korean wife, Haewon.

== Works ==
Feltsman's discography includes six albums of clavier works of J.S. Bach, recordings of Beethoven's complete Rondos and Variations and the last five piano sonatas, solo piano works of Franz Schubert, Chopin, Liszt, Brahms, Olivier Messiaen, and Valentyn Sylvestrov, as well as concerti by Bach, Frédéric Chopin, Tchaikovsky, Sergei Rachmaninov, and Sergei Prokofiev.

== Awards ==
- 1962: Debut, Moscow State Philharmonic
- 1967: First Prize, Concertina International Competition (Prague)
- 1971: Grand Prix, Marguerite Long Competition (Paris)
