= Rob Borsellino =

- Born: June 20, 1949; New York, NY
- Died: May 27, 2006 (aged 56); Des Moines, IA

Rob Borsellino (June 20, 1949 – May 27, 2006) was a newspaper columnist who worked for the Des Moines Register. His columns, which appeared three times weekly, became popular due to Borsellino's colloquial writing style and ability to tell a story straight from the heart. His columns appeared several times in such publications as USA Today, Chicago Tribune, and The Washington Post, and a compilation of Borsellino's columns were published in his 2005 book So I'm Talkin' To This Guy... (ISBN 1-888223-66-9).

In November 2004, Borsellino was diagnosed with amyotrophic lateral sclerosis (ALS), or Lou Gehrig's disease. He announced his diagnosis in February 2005. During his fight against this illness, he had considerable community support, and on April 21, 2006, musicians Bob Dylan and Merle Haggard traveled to Des Moines to perform a concert in Borsellino's honor, raising over $100,000 for the ALS Association.

Borsellino died in Des Moines on May 27, 2006. He is survived by his wife, Rekha Basu, also a Register columnist; and his sons Raj and Romen.
