= State University of New York at New Paltz =

Public university in New Paltz, New York, US

- Former names: New Paltz Classical School (1828–1833); New Paltz Academy (1833–1884); New Paltz Normal School (1885–1942); State Teachers College at New Paltz (1942–1959); State University College of Education at New Paltz (1959–1961); State University of New York College of Arts and Science New Paltz (1961–1994)
- Type: Public university
- Established: 1828; 198 years ago
- Parent institution: State University of New York
- President: Darrell P. Wheeler
- Provost: William McClure
- Students: 7,147 (fall 2025)
- Undergraduates: 6,113 (fall 2025)
- Postgraduates: 1,034 (fall 2025)
- Location: New Paltz, New York, United States; 41°44′37″N 74°05′02″W
- Campus: 257 acres (104 ha); Small town
- Colors: Blue and orange
- Nickname: Hawks
- Sporting affiliations: NCAA Division III; NJAC
- Mascot: Hugo the Hawk
- Website: newpaltz.edu

The State University of New York at New Paltz (SUNY New Paltz or New Paltz) is a public university in New Paltz, New York, United States. It traces its origins to the New Paltz Classical School, a secondary institution founded in 1828 and reorganized as an academy in 1833.

== History ==
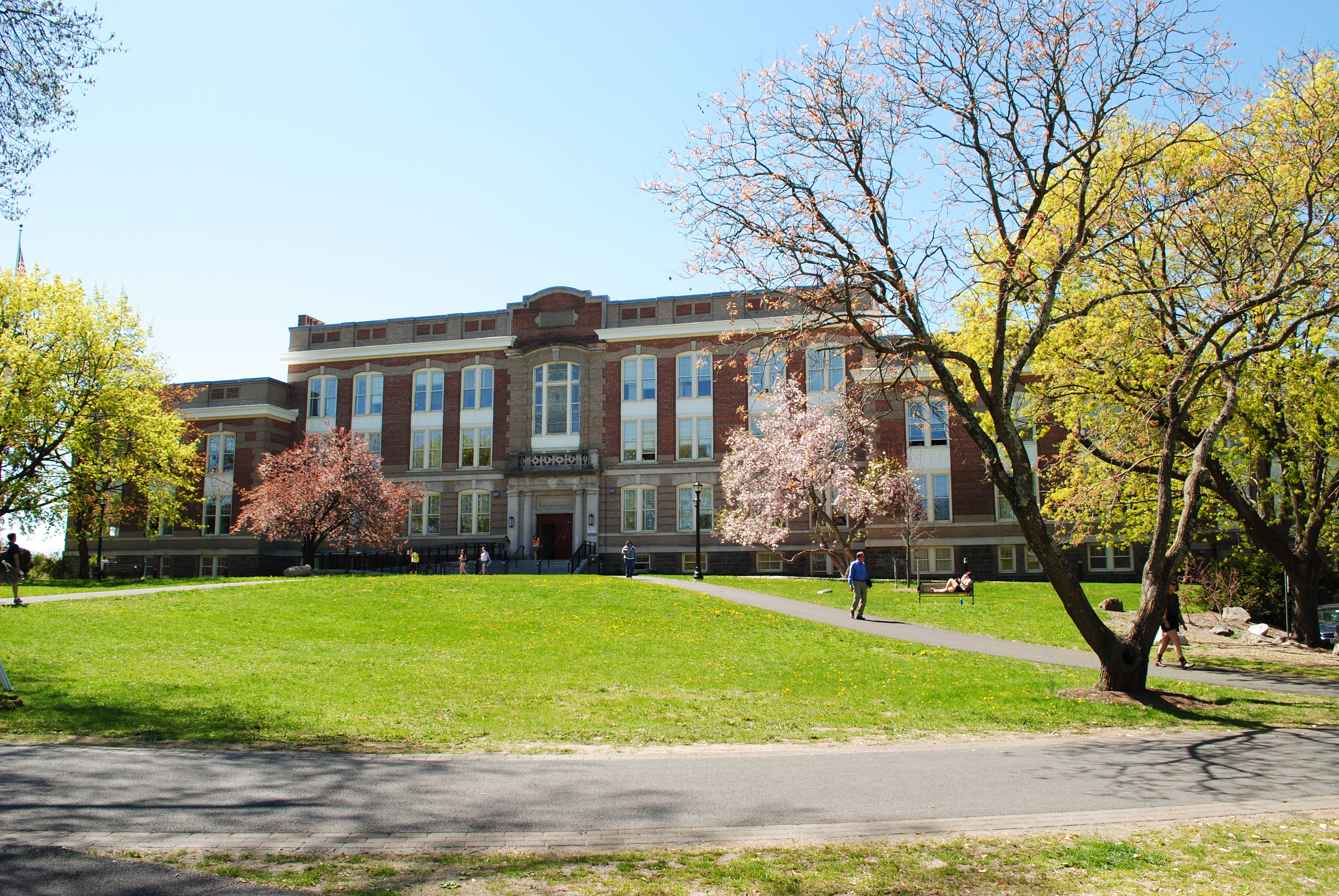
Old Main, the oldest building on campus

The university's origins can be traced back to the New Paltz Classical School, which originally opened in 1828. After changing its name to the New Paltz Academy in 1833, the school was decimated by a fire in 1884, after which the school offered their land to the state government of New York contingent upon the establishment of a normal school.

In 1885, one year after the fire, the New Paltz Normal and Training School, or New Paltz Normal School, was established to prepare teachers to practice their professions in the public schools of New York. It was granted the ability to award baccalaureate degrees in 1938, after which it was renamed as the State Teachers College at New Paltz; the inaugural class of 112 students graduated in 1942. In 1947, a graduate program in education was established.

When the State University of New York was established by legislative act in 1948, the Teachers College at New Paltz was one of 30 colleges associated under SUNY's umbrella. An art education program was added in 1951. The school experienced another name change in 1959, becoming the State University College of Education at New Paltz. One year later, in 1960, the college was authorized to confer liberal arts degrees. Just one year after that, in 1961, the school updated its name yet again, to the State University of New York College of Arts and Science at New Paltz.

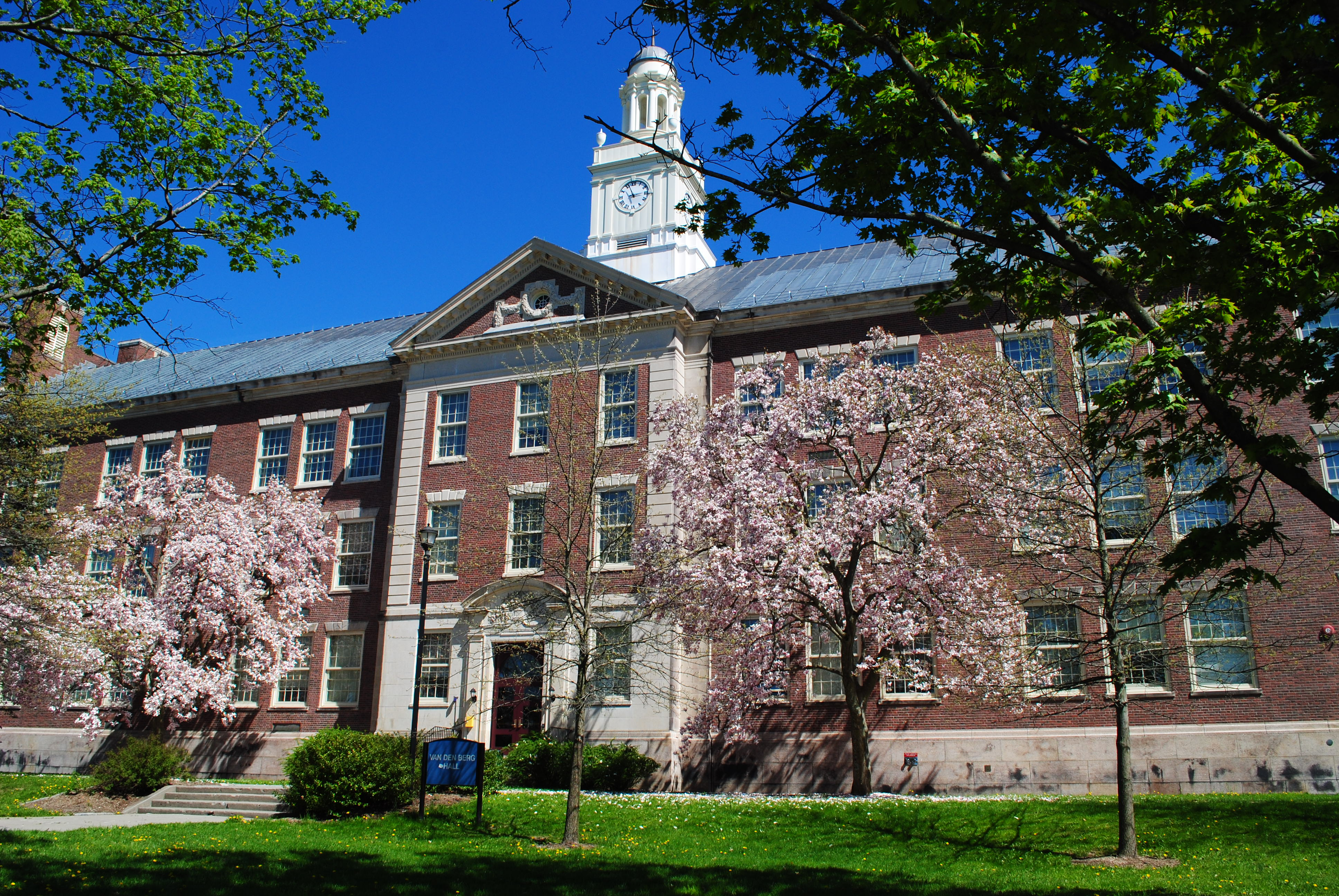
Van den Berg Hall is the second-oldest building on campus. Today it is the home to the business program.

The college's general education program (including then-vanguard introductory surveys of African and Asian cultures) was eliminated in 1971; a distribution requirement was re-instituted in 1993. A program in African American studies was established in 1968. Three years later, the experimental studies program (reorganized as the innovative studies program in 1975) began. It encompassed then-unusual disciplines including video art (under Paul Ryan), dance therapy, clowning, camping, and ecodesign. Instructors in the program were hired by students and compensated through student activity fees. A 4-acre (1.6 ha) environmental studies site operated by students and community members under the aegis of the program at the southern periphery of the campus included geodesic domes, windmills, kilns, a solar-powered house funded by the Department of Energy, and more inchoate variants of sustainable architecture. Upon ascending to the college presidency in 1980, Alice Chandler characterized the edifices as "shacks and hovels" and abolished the program in the early 1980s, demolishing most of the site in the process.

The Legislative Gazette, a journalism and political science internship in which students live and work in Albany and produce a weekly newspaper about state politics, was established in 1978.

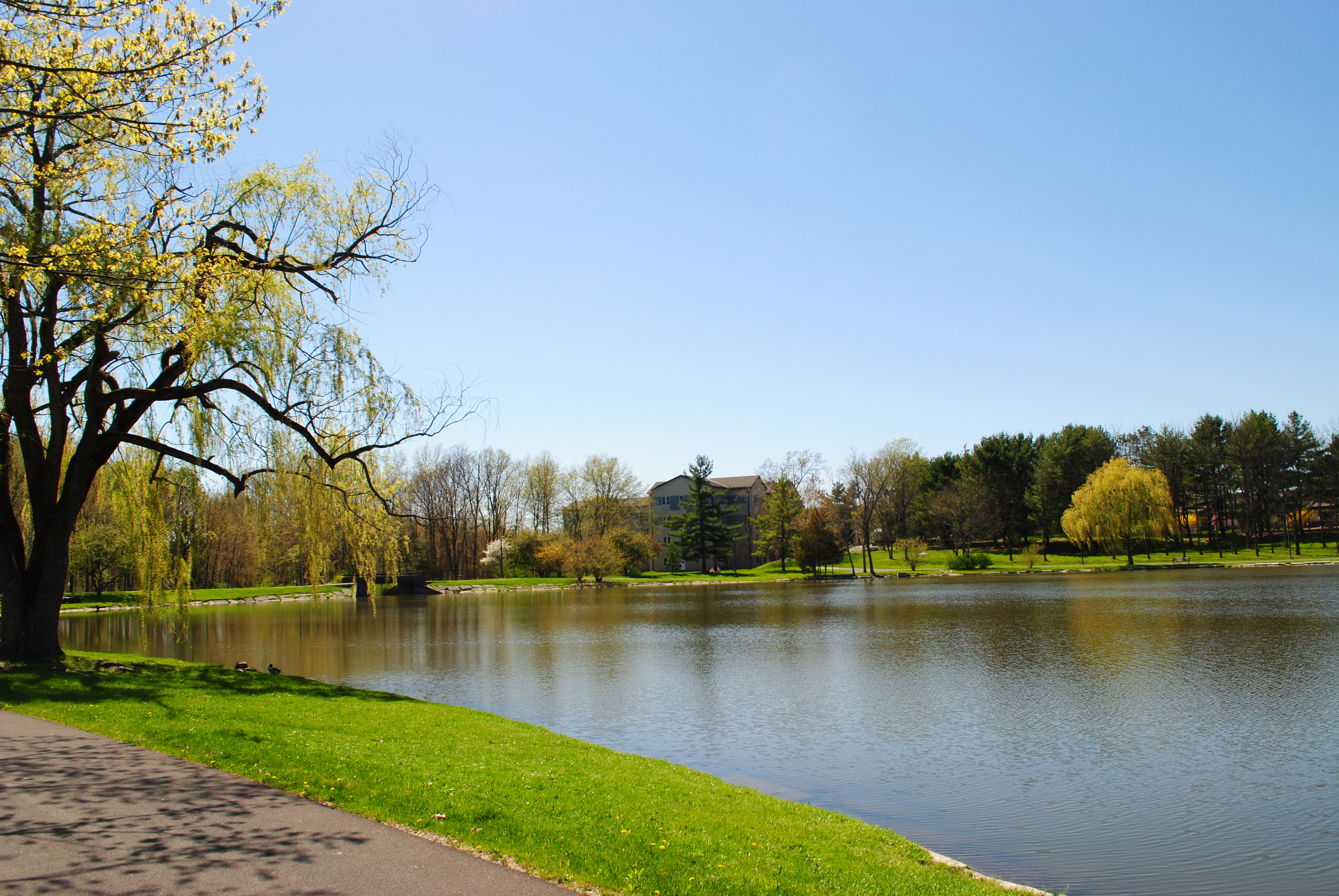
The pond ("Gunk"), with Esopus Hall in the background

On December 29, 1991, the campus was the scene of a widely reported PCB incident that contaminated four dormitories (Bliss, Gage, Capen and Scudder halls), as well as the Coykendall Science Building and Parker Theatre. Under the direction of the county and state health departments, the university began a massive, thorough cleanup effort. As an additional precaution, 29 other buildings were thoroughly tested and, if necessary, cleaned. The clean-up process lasted until May 1995. Since 1994, PCBs have not been used on the SUNY New Paltz campus.

The college was rebranded as the State University of New York at New Paltz in 1994.

In November 1997, two events on campus attracted nationwide media attention. The first, a feminist conference on sex and sexuality sponsored by the women's studies department entitled "Revolting Behavior: The Challenges of Women's Sexual Freedom", featured an instructional workshop on sex toys and a lecture panel on sadomasochism. The second, a seminar entitled "Subject to Desire: Refiguring the Body", was sponsored by the School of Fine and Performing Arts. One presenter, Fluxus performance artist and longtime New Paltz resident Carolee Schneemann, was best known for Interior Scroll (1975), a piece that culminated in her unrolling a scroll from her vagina and reading it to the audience; at the seminar, Schneemann exhibited abstract photographs of her vagina as part of Vulva's Morphia (1995).

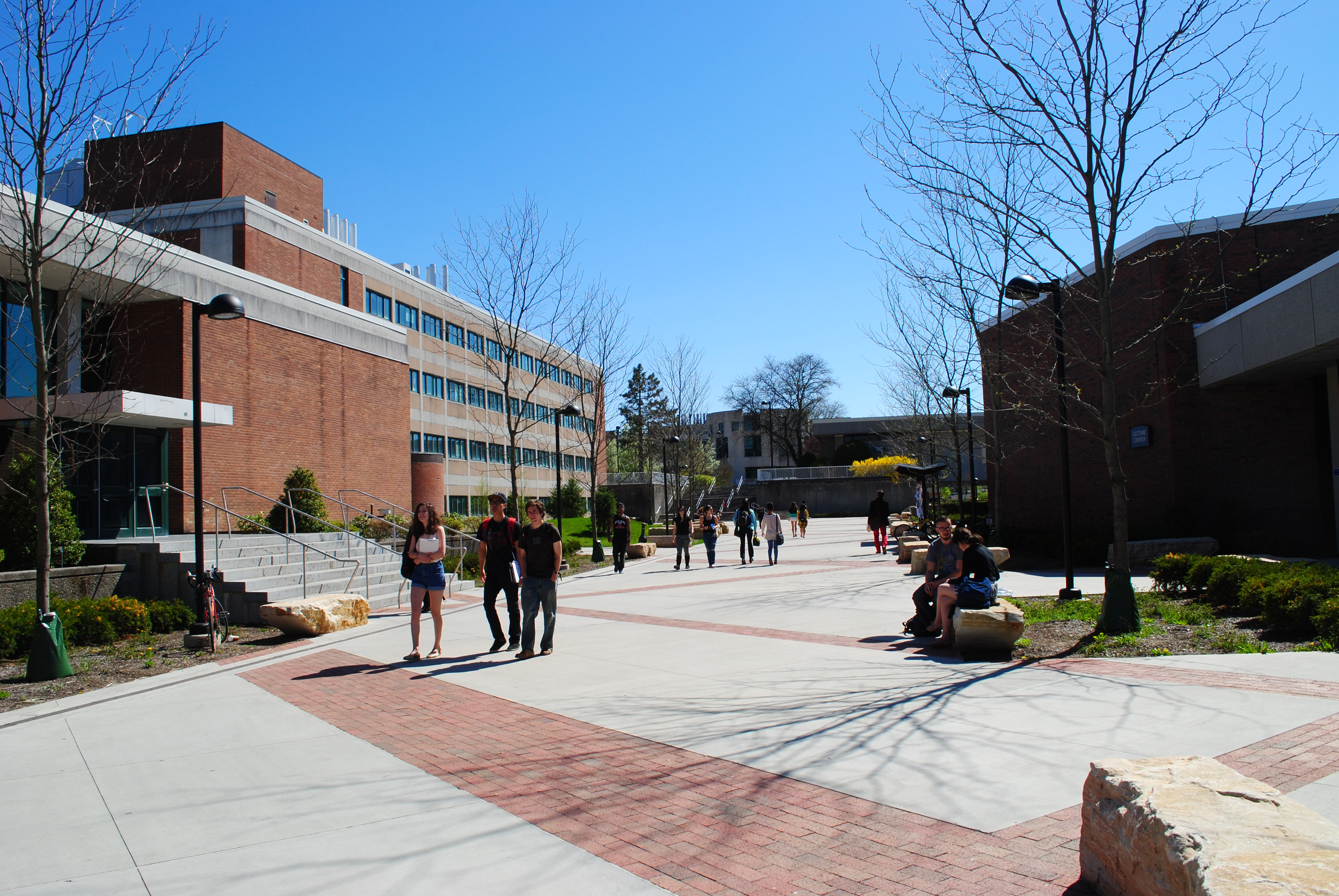
The Excelsior Concourse, one of the busiest parts of campus

Political conservatives were outraged that a public university had hosted such events, and Governor George Pataki and SUNY chancellor Robert King expressed their displeasure. The controversy escalated when the theatre arts department staged The Vagina Monologues shortly afterwards. The college's then-president, Roger Bowen, defended freedom of expression on campus and refused to apologize, doing little to allay conservative ire. "The real issue," he said, "is whether some ideologues, however well-intentioned, have the right to dictate what we say and what we do on this campus." SUNY trustee Candace de Russy called for him to be dismissed. Bowen later resigned.

In 2023, the institution was officially reclassified as a university by the State University of New York. The change took effect January 1, 2023, exactly seventy-five years after the SUNY system was founded; New Paltz was a founding member.

In 2022, the Louis D. Brandeis Center for Human Rights Under Law and Jewish on Campus filed a civil rights complaint with the United States Department of Education after a Jewish student was removed from a student-led group she had co-founded for sexual assault survivors after sharing a pro-Israel post on her personal social media. The lawsuit was resolved in December 2024, with the university acknowledging that antisemitic discrimination, including against Israelis, is in contravention of its policies. The university committed to mandatory training on antisemitism for student organizations.

== Campus ==
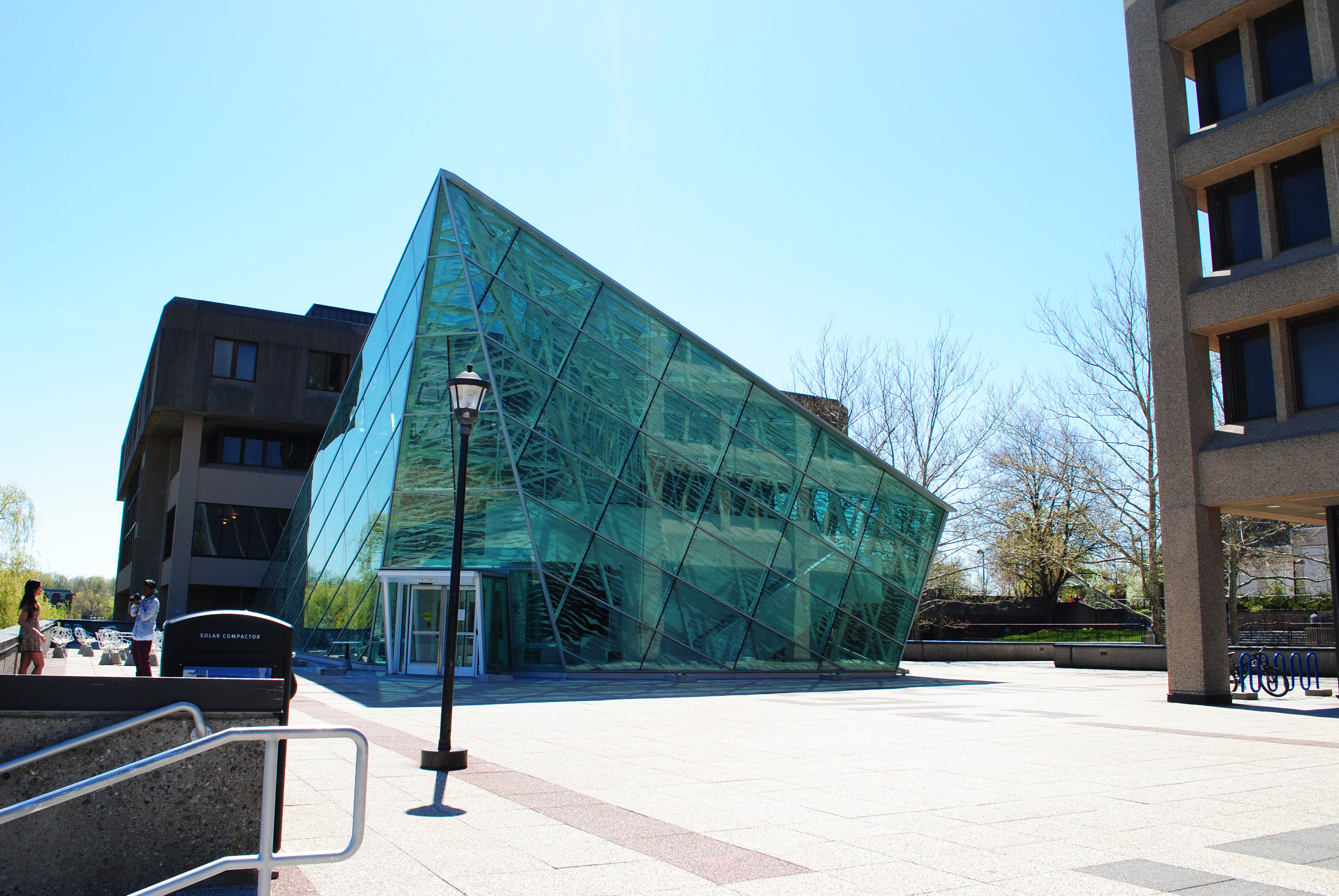
Atrium of the Student Union Building, opened in 2010

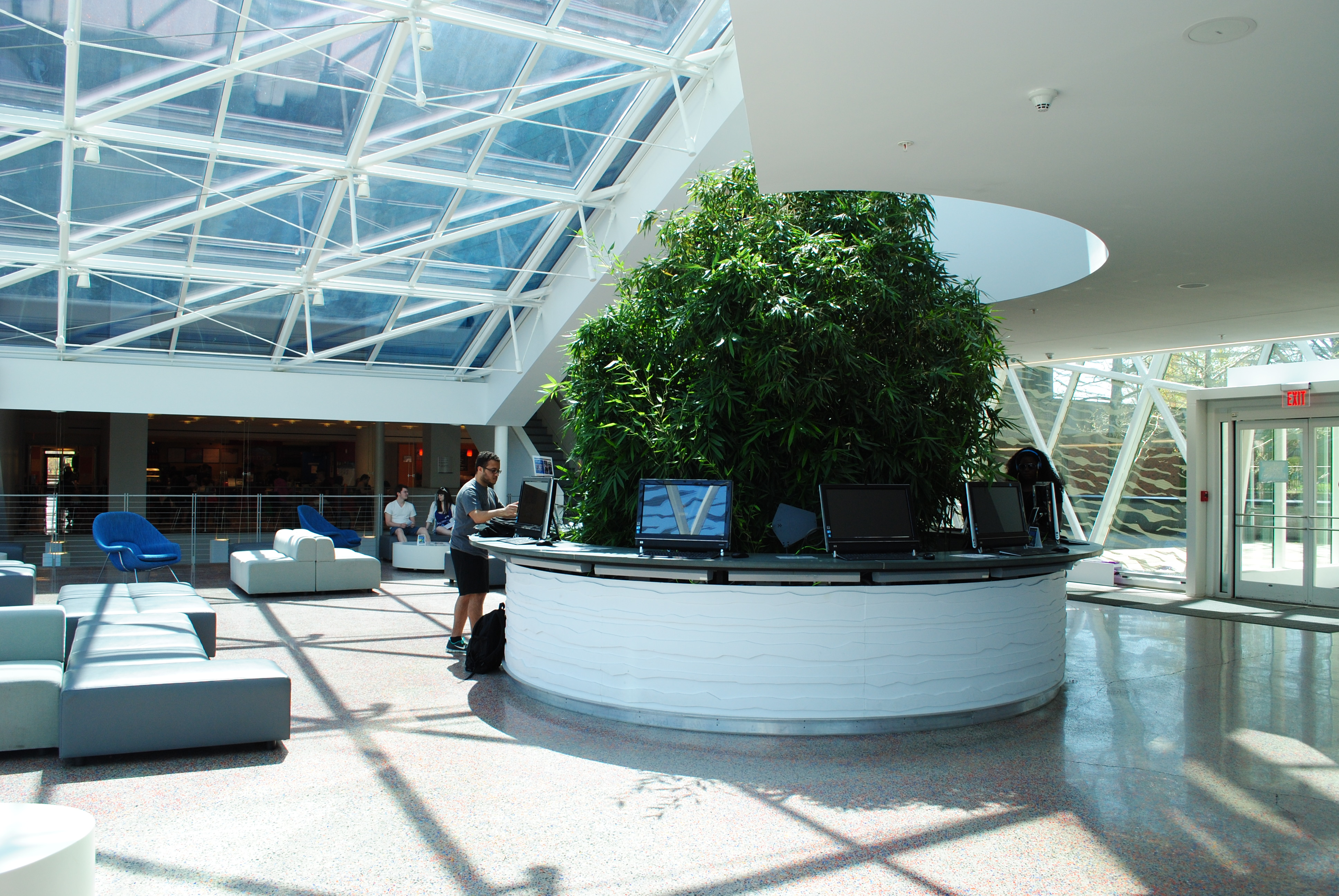
Inside the Atrium

The SUNY New Paltz campus consists of about 216 acres (87 ha) in the small town of New Paltz, New York. There are 14 residence halls, centered mostly in two quads. The main campus has two dozen academic buildings, including the Haggerty Administration Building, a lecture hall, Old Main, Sojourner Truth Library, one main dining hall, the Student Union Building, Science Hall and extensive gymnasium and sports areas.

The college also operated the Ashokan campus in Olivebridge, New York, consisting of another 400 acres (160 ha). In 2008 it was sold by Campus Auxiliary Services to the Open Space Conservancy; it is now operated as the Ashokan Center.

SUNY New Paltz has undergone extensive construction projects since 2008, totaling nearly $300 million.

=== Campus theaters ===
SUNY at New Paltz has three on-campus theaters.

==== McKenna Theater ====
McKenna Theatre is a fully equipped proscenium theatre, with seating for 366. The theater is named in honor of Dr. Rebecca McKenna, professor of English and drama and the founder of the theatre arts program at New Paltz. At the rear of the theater is a sound booth for digital audio equipment which has the capabilities to play back, mix, and amplify audio. There is also a lighting booth with a computerized light board (controlling over 200 dimmers) and LCD video projection equipment behind the audience (and upstairs). There are 32 line sets in the fly space above the stage. There is also a scene shop behind the stage, storage area for scenery, a paint shop, and other technical facilities.

==== Parker Theater ====
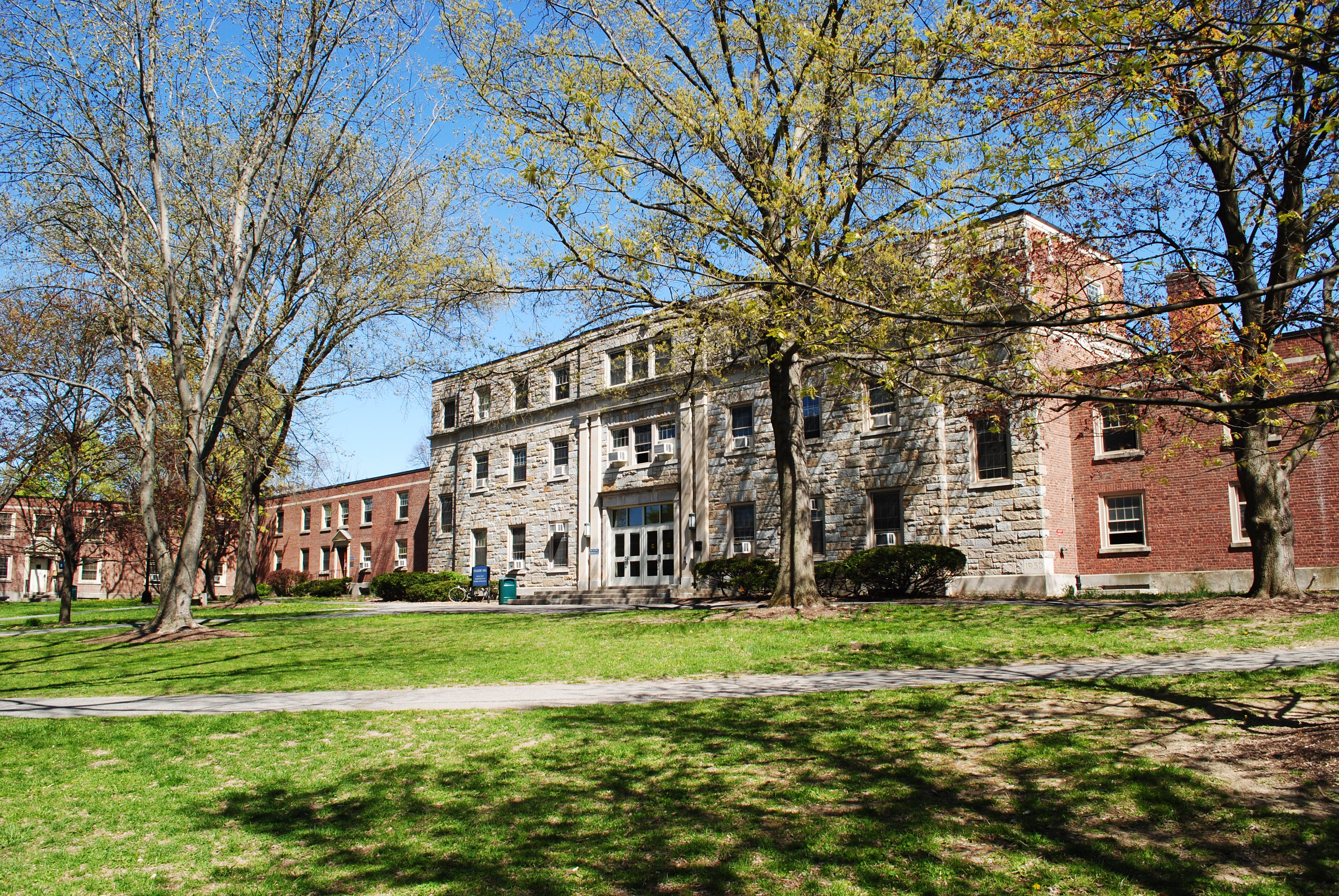
College Hall, home to the Max and Nadia Shepard Recital Hall, and the oldest residence hall on campus

The building was originally built as a dining hall. Parker was then converted to a theatre venue and teaching space. In 1972 it was made into a theatre production facility. The building was renovated in 1994, featuring a modified thrust stage surrounded by a three-quarter audience configuration seating up to 200 people. In the rear are lighting and sound booths with computerized light board (controlling over 90 dimmers) and digital audio equipment. To both sides of the stage are performance studio spaces. Classes are offered in acting, voice, movement, and musical theatre. On the same floor of the theater are a costume studio, dressing rooms, costume maintenance, storage facilities, and faculty offices.

Parker Theatre was built in 1962. It houses the Raymond T. Kurdt Theatrical Design Collection.

==== Max and Nadia Shepard Recital Hall ====
Max and Nadia Shepard Recital Hall is located in College Hall, the oldest residence hall on campus. Built in 1951, it is a landmark, and is the closest hall to the village of New Paltz. Its basement, now used primarily for storage, was built as a fallout shelter, and was stocked as such until the 1980s. The only remaining remnant are the "fallout toilets".

The facility contains 125 seats and is named in honor of patrons of the performing arts programs at SUNY New Paltz. The hall offers a delicate setting for student recitals and chamber music performances. The rear of the hall contains a small studio equipped with Pro-tools HD and a Control 24 sound board used for recording professional performances.

Max and Nadia Shepard Recital Hall is an important facility for the community. It hosts many recitals and is an integral part of the Piano Summer program.

=== Samuel Dorsky Museum of Art ===
At the center of campus is the Samuel Dorsky Museum of Art, which opened in 2001. With more than 9,000 square feet of exhibition space in six galleries, the Dorsky is one of the largest art museums in the SUNY system. The East Wing includes the Morgan Anderson Gallery, Howard Greenberg Family Gallery, Sara Bedrick Gallery, and the Corridor Gallery, and the West Wing includes the Alice and Horace Chandler Gallery and the North Gallery. The Dorsky's permanent collection comprises more than 7,000 works of American art (with emphasis on the Hudson Valley and Catskill Regions), photography, metals, and a "world collection" of art and artifacts dating back to ancient times and representing diverse cultures. Through its collections, exhibitions, and public programs, the Dorsky supports and enriches the academic programs at the college, presents a broad range of world art for study and enjoyment, and serves as a center for Hudson Valley arts and culture. The Dorsky's facilities include research and seminar rooms for visitors, students and professors at SUNY New Paltz.

== Student life ==
Undergraduate demographics as of Fall 2023
Race and ethnicity	Total
White	59%
Hispanic	23%
Black	7%
Asian	4%
Two or more races	3%
Unknown	2%
International student	1%
Economic diversity
Low-income (Note: The percentage of students who received an income-based federal Pell grant intended for low-income students.)	34%
Affluent (Note: The percentage of students who are a part of the American middle class at the bare minimum.)	66%

=== Athletics ===
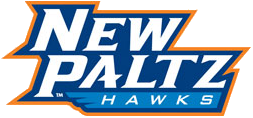
New Paltz Hawks wordmark

SUNY New Paltz teams participate as a member of the National Collegiate Athletic Association's Division III. The Hawks are a member of the New Jersey Athletic Conference (NJAC). Men's sports include baseball, basketball, cross country, soccer, swimming & diving, volleyball and lacrosse; women's sports include basketball, cross country, field hockey, lacrosse, soccer, softball, swimming & diving, tennis and volleyball.

For the first time in program history, New Paltz men’s volleyball team captured the NCAA Division III Tournament title in 2016. The win also marked the first NCAA title for any New Paltz team. Three years later, they defeated UC Santa Cruz to win their second championship in the sport and second for the school overall.

=== Clubs and traditions ===
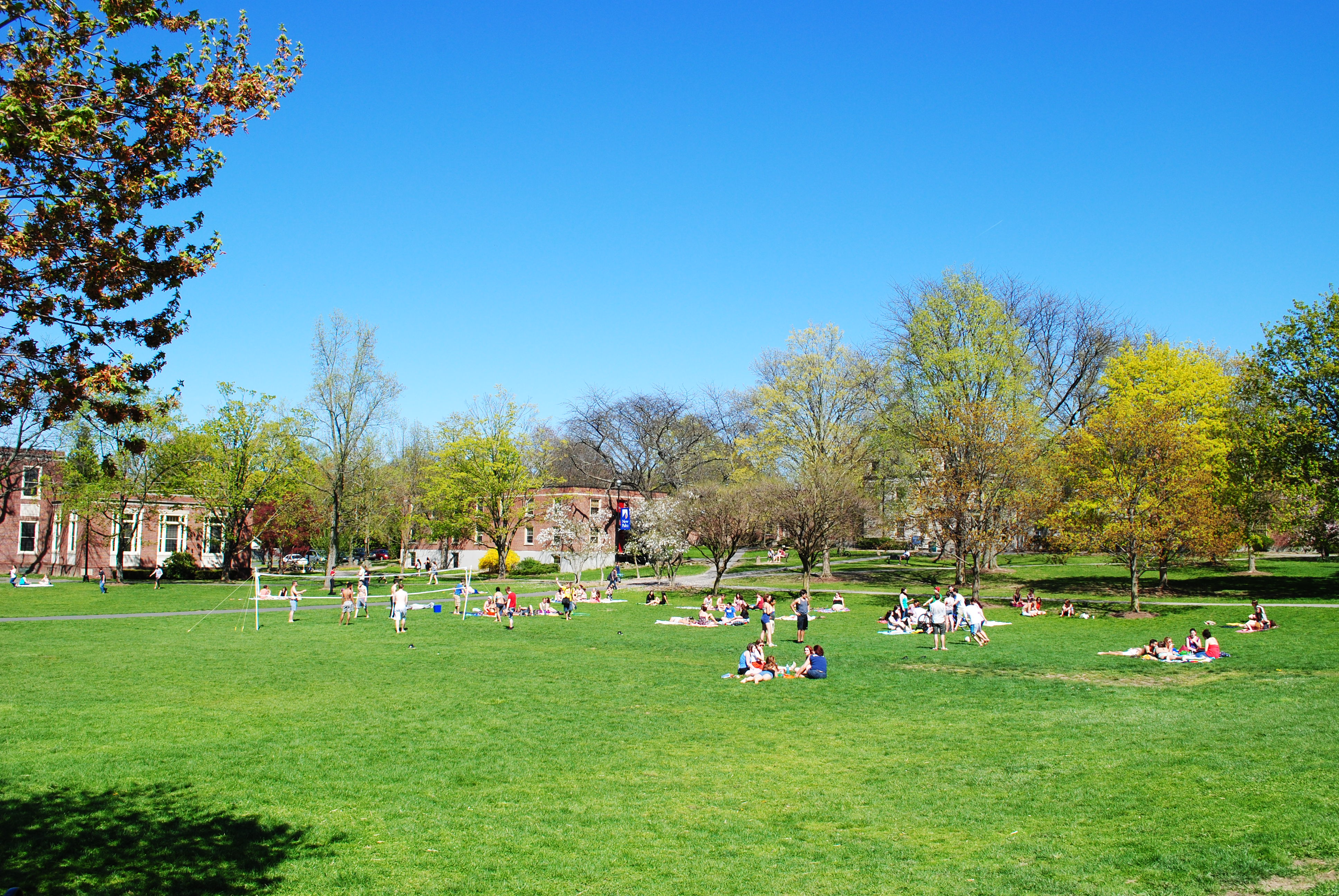
The quad at SUNY New Paltz

The student governance is operated by the Student Association, which funds most student activities through a mandatory fee. There are many clubs, fraternities, and sororities. Clubs that are recognized by the Student Association are organized into one of six boards: academic, advocacy, athletic, fine and performing arts, media, and social and cultural. There is also an on-campus government, the Residence Hall Student Association (RHSA).

The college has an auxiliary services corporation common to many state campuses in New York, called Campus Auxiliary Services, Inc. This on-campus company operates the dining halls and bookstore, as well as being the source of discretionary funds for spending by the college president and the RHSA.

The college has a foundation and an active alumni association.

The Center for Student Media at SUNY New Paltz consists of six clubs in the organization:

The college's official student newspaper is The Oracle. In 2010, it was honored by the Society of Professional Journalists for having the Best Affiliated Website for four-year college or university (Region 1 competition). It was named as a runner-up for the National Title.

The campus TV station was WNPC TV, it has since become Hawk Studios, a media production club. The college's radio station, WFNP, is known as "The Edge". It broadcasts part-time at FM 88.7, and also streams online.

=== Greek life ===
There are several recognized fraternities and sororities at the university. Fraternity life at SUNY New Paltz traces back to the late nineteenth century. The Zeta Chapter of the Delphic Fraternity, founded in 1899 through the merger of two local literary fraternities at the New Paltz Normal School, is considered the first fraternity established at the institution.

=== Student activism ===
==== Vietnam War ====
The Cambodian Campaign and concomitant Kent State shootings in May 1970 led to a protest that culminated in a five-day student occupation of the Administration Building, subsequently renamed Old Main after the opening of the Haggerty Administration Building two years later. A March 1974 sit-in at the Haggerty Building reacted against perceived discriminatory hiring practices, the state-mandated reintegration of Shango Hall (which then housed underrepresented students), and the threatened cessation of the experimental studies program in the wake of a budget shortfall.

==== Israel-Gaza War ====
Protests at the university over the Gaza war began in early 2024. On February 28, 2024, members of the Israel Defense Forces were invited to campus by the Jewish Student Union with the assistance of the New Paltz chapter of Students Supporting Israel, to discuss their experiences serving, as well as their opinions of the war. In response a protest rally was organized by New Paltz Students for Palestine, in which over 150 students, alumni, and activists protested during and after the event.

On May 1, 2024, over 100 students, faculty and others pitched in to establish an encampment on Parker Quad, spurred on by the Gaza Solidarity encampments established at other colleges across the country. President Wheeler visited the encampment and asked them to dismantle the tents, but students refused. The demands of the organizers included divestment from companies doing business with Israel, amnesty for people disciplined by the school, and disclosure of the investments the school makes. The following day, on May 2, two members of Student Affairs visited the encampment in an effort to get students to dismantle it. The protesters refused to leave, and administration called the police. Over 100 people were arrested, with at least three people injured, one student being kicked in the face and an elderly woman allegedly knocked unconscious.

== Notable alumni and faculty ==
See List of State University of New York at New Paltz people

== See also ==
- List of university art museums and galleries in New York State
