= Agnetha Fältskog discography =

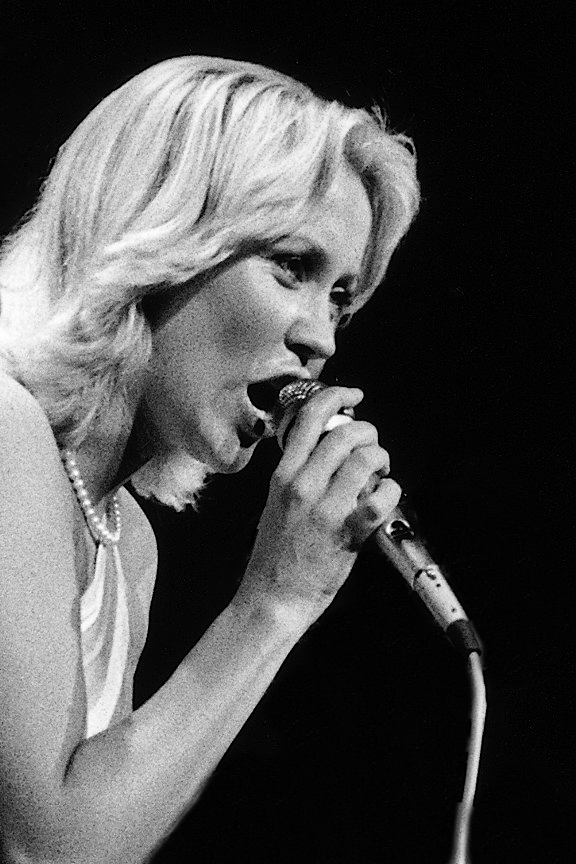
- Studio albums: 12
- Soundtrack albums: 76
- Live albums: 5
- Compilation albums: 11
- Singles: 43
- B-sides: 45
- Music videos: 19

The article includes the discography of Agnetha Fältskog. For detailed information on her recordings with ABBA, see ABBA discography

== Studio albums ==
=== Swedish-language albums ===
List of albums, with Swedish chart positions
Title	Album details	SWE Chart		Producer
Title	Album details	Peak position	Time in (weeks)	Producer
Agnetha Fältskog	Released: 1968; Label: Cupol (CLP 64); Format: LP, Reel tape	65	—	Karl Gerhard Lundkvist
Agnetha Fältskog Vol. 2	Released: 1969; Label: Cupol (CLP 80); Format: LP	—	—	Karl Gerhard Lundkvist
Som jag är	Released: 1970; Label: CBS Cupol (CLPN 345); Format: LP	54	—	Karl Gerhard Lundkvist, Björn Ulvaeus
När en vacker tanke blir en sång	Released: 1971; Label: CBS Cupol (CLPN 348); Format: LP	—	—	Björn Ulvaeus
Elva kvinnor i ett hus	Released: December 1, 1975; Label: CBS Cupol (CLPS 351); Format: LP, cassette; Certification: Gold (50,000+)	11	26	Agnetha Fältskog
Nu tändas tusen juleljus (with Linda Ulvaeus)	Released: October, 1981; Label: Polar (POLS 328); Format: LP, cassette	6	8	Agnetha Fältskog, Michael B. Tretow
Kom följ med i vår karusell (with Christian Ulvaeus)	Released: 1987; Label: WEA (242 186-1); Format: LP, cassette	—	—	Agnetha Fältskog, Michael B. Tretow
"—" denotes releases that did not chart, or that no chart existed.

=== English-language albums ===
List of albums, with selected chart positions
Title	Album details	Peak chart positions										Certifications
Title	Album details	SWE	AUS	BEL	DEN	FIN	GER	NED	NOR	SWI	UK	Certifications
Wrap Your Arms Around Me	Released: 31 May 1983 / 8 August 1983 (US); Label: Polar (POLS 365); Format: CD, cassette, LP	1	49	—	—	—	13	4	1	—	18	GLF: 3× Platinum; Musiikkituottajat: Gold; NVPI: Gold
Eyes of a Woman	Released: March 1985; Label: Polar (POLS 385); Format: CD, cassette, LP	2	—	—	—	—	30	19	14	—	38	GLF: Platinum
I Stand Alone	Released: 9 November 1987; Label: Warner Music (WX 150); Format: CD, cassette, LP	1	96	—	—	—	47	19	15	—	72	GLF: 2× Platinum
My Colouring Book	Released: April 23, 2004; Label: Warner Music (5050467-3122-2-7); Format: CD	1	50	38	5	2	6	11	25	17	12	BPI: Silver; GLF: Gold; Musiikkituottajat: Gold
A	Released: May 10, 2013; Label: Universal Music; Format: CD, digital download, LP	2	3	6	2	15	3	5	3	2	6	ARIA: Platinum; BPI: Gold; BVMI: Gold; GLF: Gold

==== Reissues ====
List of reissues, with selected chart positions
Title	Album details	Peak chart positions		
Title	Album details	SWE	AUS	GER
A+	Released: October 13, 2023; Label: BMG Rights Management; Format: CD, 2×CD, digital download, LP, 2×LP	8	94	5

== Compilation albums ==
List of albums, with Swedish chart positions
Title	Album details	SWE Chart		Certifications
Title	Album details	Peak position	Time in (weeks)	Certifications
Agnetha Fältskogs Bästa	Released: 1973; Label: Cupol (CLPL 1023); Format: LP	—	—	
Tio år med Agnetha	Released: 1979; Label: Cupol (CLPS 352); Format: LP, CD	32	6	
Teamtoppen 1	Released: 1985; Label: Marian (MK 2135); Format: Cassette	—	—	
Agnetha Collection	Released: 1986 (Finland only); Label: Kaktus (KAKLP 10); Format: LP	—	—	
Sjung denna sång	Released: 1986; Label: Cupol (CLPM 5041); Format: LP	—	—	
Geh' mit Gott	Released: 1994; Label: Royal Records; Format: CD	—	—	
My Love, My Life	Released: September 1996; Label: Sony Music (COL 483910-2); Format: CD	21	3	
That's Me	Released: 1998; Label: Polydor (539 928-2/4); Format: CD	—	—	
Agnetha Fältskogs svensktoppar	Released: 1998; Label: Sony Music (4896712); Format: CD	—	—	
13 Hits	Released: 2004; Label: Universal (986 566-6); Format: CD	—	—	
My Very Best	Released: October 2008; Label: Sony Music (88697389442); Format: 2×CD	4	11	GLF: Gold
Singlar och andra sidor	Released: April 2024; Label: Sony Music, Cupol; Format: LP	31		
"—" denotes releases that did not chart.

== Box sets ==
- 2004 Agnetha Fältskog De Första Åren
- 2008 Original Album Classics (5 CDs)
- 2010 Original Album Classics (3 CDs)

== Singles ==
=== Swedish singles ===
During the late 1960s and early 1970s, many singles were released from Agnetha Fältskog's Swedish solo albums. Three of them eventually showed up on the official Swedish singles chart (as indicated in the column "charts peak" in the table below).

Besides the official sales chart, the radio chart Svensktoppen can be regarded as the most important hit list in those days (and probably still today). The Svensktoppen chart is made up by jury votes, mostly listeners, and indicates the popularity of a song. Agnetha Fältskog's songs showed up on Svensktoppen numerous times, four of which even topped the charts while a total of 15 reached the top 5.

It was not always the A-side of a released single that would eventually show up on Svensktoppen. Sometimes also the B-side or even a non-single track managed to crack the top 10. For clarification, the song that eventually did show up on Svensktoppen can be found in the "Svensktoppen entry" column, with additional info about its date of entry, the highest position and the number of weeks the song stayed on the charts.

Year	A-side	B-side	Label	Charts peak	Svensktoppen entry	Date	HP (peak position)	TI (weeks)	Album
1967	Följ med mig	Jag var så kär	CS 211	1	Jag var så kär	28 January 1968	3	7	Agnetha Fältskog
1968	Slutet gott, allting gott	Utan dej mitt liv går vidare	CS 217	—	Utan dej mitt liv går vidare	31 March 1968	8	2	Agnetha Fältskog
1968	En sommar med dej	Försonade	CS 233	—					Agnetha Fältskog
1968	Den jag väntat på	Allting har förändrat sig	CS 236	7	Den jag väntat på	15 September 1968	9	1	Agnetha Fältskog
1968	Den jag väntat på	Allting har förändrat sig	CS 236	7	Allting har förändrat sig	22 September 1968	2	7	Agnetha Fältskog
1968	Sjung denna sång (with Jörgen Edman)	Någonting händer med mig (with Jörgen Edman)	CS 239	—	Någonting händer med mig	1 December 1968	9	1	Agnetha Fältskog
1968	Snövit och de sju dvärgarna	Min farbror Jonathan	CS 244	—					Agnetha Fältskog
1969	En gång fanns bara vi två	Fram för svenska sommaren	CS 250	—	Fram för svenska sommaren	11 May 1969	4	4	Agnetha Fältskog Vol. 2
1969	Hjärtats kronprins	Tag min hand låt oss bli vänner	CS 256	—					Agnetha Fältskog Vol. 2
1969	Zigenarvän	Som en vind kom du till mig	CS 260	—	Zigenarvän	23 November 1969	5	6	Agnetha Fältskog Vol. 2
1970	Om tårar vore guld	Litet solskensbarn	CS 264	—	Om tårar vore guld	12 April 1970	3	15	Som jag är
1970	Ta det bara med ro	Som ett eko	CS 272	—					Som jag är
1971	En sång och en saga	Jag ska göra allt	CS 275	—	En sång och en saga	28 March 1971	4	5	Som jag är
1971	Kungens vaktparad	Jag vill att du skall bli lycklig	CS 277	—					När en vacker tanke blir en sång
1971	Många gånger än	Han lämnar mig för att komma till dig	CS 278	—	Många gånger än	3 October 1971	5	7	När en vacker tanke blir en sång
1971	Dröm är dröm, och saga saga	Nya ord	CS 280	—	Dröm är dröm, och saga saga	26 December 1971	3	8	När en vacker tanke blir en sång
1972					Sången föder dig tillbaka	20 February 1972	10	1	När en vacker tanke blir en sång
1972	Vart ska min kärlek föra	Nu ska du bli stilla	CS 284	—	Vart ska min kärlek föra	23 March 1972	1	5	Agnetha Fältskogs bästa
1972	Så glad som dina ögon	Tio mil kvar till Korpilombolo	CS 291	—	Så glad som dina ögon	10 December 1972	5	5	Agnetha Fältskogs bästa
1973	En sång om sorg och glädje	Vi har hunnit fram till refrängen	CS 297	—	En sång om sorg och glädje	18 November 1973	1	14	Agnetha Fältskogs bästa
1975	Dom har glömt	Gulleplutt	CUS 301	—					Elva kvinnor i ett hus
1975	S.O.S. (swedish version)	Visa i åttonde månaden	CUS 303	4	S.O.S. (swedish version)	22 November 1975	1	11	Elva kvinnor i ett hus
1976					Doktorn!	13 March 1976	5	9	Elva kvinnor i ett hus
1976					Tack för en underbar vanlig dag	17 April 1976	5	11	Elva kvinnor i ett hus
1979	När du tar mig i din famn	Jag var så kär	CUS 304	—	När du tar mig i din famn	4 November 1979	1	10	Tio år med Agnetha
1981					Hej mitt vinterland (with Linda Ulvaeus)	13 December 1981	8	1	Nu tändas tusen juleljus
1987	Karusellvisan (with Christian Ulvaeus)	Liten och trött (with Christian Ulvaeus)	WEA	—					Kom följ med i vår karusell
1987	På söndag (with Christian Ulvaeus)	Mitt namn är blom (with Christian Ulvaeus)	WEA	—					Kom följ med i vår karusell

=== German singles ===
Year	A-side	B-side
1968	Robinson Crusoe	Sonny Boy (Musik: Dieter Zimmermann Text: Hans-Ulrich Weigel)
1968	Señor Gonzales	Mein schönster Tag (Between these Arms) (Originaltext und Musik: William Jenikins Howard Evans Deutscher text: hans-Ulrich Weigel)
1969	Concerto d'amore German version of "Det handlar om kärlek"	Wie der Wind; Musik: Dieter Zimmermann Text: Hans-Ulrich Weigel
1969	Wer schreibt heut' noch Liebesbriefe	Das Fest der Pompadour
1970	Fragezeichen mag ich nicht	Wie der nächste Autobus
1970	Ein kleiner Mann in einer Flasche	Ich suchte Liebe bei dir
1972	Geh' mit Gott	Tausend Wunder; German version of "Jag skall göra allt"
1972	Komm' doch zu mir	Ich denk' an dich German version of "Han lämnar mig för att komma till dig"

=== English singles ===
List of singles, with selected chart positions
Title	Year	Peak chart positions										Album
Title	Year	SWE	AUS	BEL (FL)	CAN	FRA	GER	IRE	NED	UK	US	Album
"Golliwog"	1974	—	—	—	—	—	—	—	—	—	—	single only
"Never Again" (with Tomas Ledin)	1982	2	—	9	—	44	37	—	19	—	—	The Human Touch (Tomas Ledin album)
"The Heat Is On"	1983	1	—	2	—	10	20	28	5	35	—	Wrap Your Arms Around Me
"Wrap Your Arms Around Me"	1983	—	—	1	—	—	30	15	4	44	—	Wrap Your Arms Around Me
"Can't Shake Loose"	1983	—	76	24	23	42	—	—	—	63	29	Wrap Your Arms Around Me
"Man" ^{[A]}	1983	—	—	—	—	—	—	—	—	—	—	Wrap Your Arms Around Me
"It's So Nice to Be Rich"	1983	8	—	—	—	—	—	—	—	—	—	single only
"I Won't Let You Go"	1985	6	—	7	—	—	24	—	17	84	—	Eyes of a Woman
"One Way Love"	1985	—	—	—	—	—	—	—	—	—	—	Eyes of a Woman
"Just One Heart" ^{[B]}	1985	—	—	—	—	—	—	—	—	—	—	Eyes of a Woman
"The Angels Cry" ^{[B]}	1985	—	—	—	—	—	—	—	—	—	—	Eyes of a Woman
"The Way You Are" (with Ola Håkansson)	1986	1	—	—	—	—	—	—	—	—	—	single only
"The Last Time"	1987	—	—	24	—	—	49	—	40	77	—	I Stand Alone
"I Wasn't the One (Who Said Goodbye)" (with Peter Cetera)	1987	—	—	—	94	—	—	—	—	200	93	I Stand Alone
"Let It Shine"	1988	—	—	—	—	—	—	—	—	—	—	I Stand Alone
"The Queen of Hearts" ^{[C]}	1998	53	—	—	—	—	—	—	—	—	—	That's Me – The Greatest Hits
"If I Thought You'd Ever Change Your Mind"	2004	2	—	45	—	—	—	—	20	11	—	My Colouring Book
"When You Walk in the Room"	2004	11	—	—	—	—	—	—	—	34	—	My Colouring Book
"Sometimes When I'm Dreaming"	2004	—	—	—	—	—	—	—	—	—	—	My Colouring Book
"The One Who Loves You Now" ^{[D]}	2013	—	—	—	—	—	71	—	—	—	—	A
"When You Really Loved Someone"	2013	—	—	69^{[E]}	—	—	—	—	76	115	—	A
"Dance Your Pain Away"	2013	—	—	117^{[E]}	—	—	—	—	—	—	—	A
"I Should've Followed You Home" (with Gary Barlow)	2013	—	—	—	—	—	—	—	—	99	—	A
"Where Do We Go from Here?"	2023	8	—	—	—	—	—	—	—	— (Note: "Where Do We Go from Here?" did not enter the UK Top 100 but debuted and peaked at number 25 on the UK Singles Downloads Chart Top 100 on 1 September 2023.)	—	A+
"—" denotes releases that did not chart or weren't released in that country

^{A} Poland- and South Africa-only release
^{B} Dutch-only release
^{C} Sweden-only release
^{D} Germany- and Austria-only release in May 2013, UK release in November 2013
^{E} Ultratip entries #19 and #67 respectively

== Music videos ==
Year	Title	Album
1983	"The Heat Is On"	Wrap Your Arms Around Me
1983	"Can't Shake Loose"	Wrap Your Arms Around Me
1985	"I Won't Let You Go"	Eyes of a Woman
1985	"One Way Love"	Eyes of a Woman
1985	"Click Track"	Eyes of a Woman
1985	"Just One Heart"	Eyes of a Woman
1985	"We Should Be Together"	Eyes of a Woman
1985	"We Move As One"	Eyes of a Woman
1987	"The Last Time"	I Stand Alone
1988	"I Wasn't the One (Who Said Goodbye)" (with Peter Cetera's only vocals)	I Stand Alone
1988	"Let It Shine"	I Stand Alone
2004	"If I Thought You'd Ever Change Your Mind"	My Colouring Book
2004	"When You Walk in the Room"	My Colouring Book
2004	"Sometimes When I'm Dreaming"	My Colouring Book
2004	"Past, Present and Future"	My Colouring Book
2004	"What Now My Love"	My Colouring Book
2013	"When You Really Loved Someone"	A
2013	"I Should've Followed You Home" (with Gary Barlow)	A
2023	"Where Do We Go from Here?"	A+
