= My Very Best =

Greatest hits album by Agnetha Fältskog
- Released: 8 October 2008
- Recorded: 1968–2004
- Genre: Pop
- Length: 126:00
- Label: Sony Music Sweden
- Producer: various

Agnetha Fältskog chronology
De första åren (2004)	My Very Best (2008)	A (2013)

My Very Best is a compilation album by Agnetha Fältskog which was released on October 8, 2008. The album was released as a celebration of the 40 year anniversary of Agnetha's first hit single "Jag var så kär".

It was released in jewel case and digipack. CD 1 focused on her recordings in Swedish, while CD 2 focused on her recordings in English.

The album debuted at #4 on the Swedish albums chart, and has been certified Gold in recognition of 20,000 copies sold.

== Track list ==
CD 1
No.	Title	Writer(s)	Original Album/Year	Length
1.	"S.O.S." (Swedish version)	Benny Andersson, Björn Ulvaeus, Stig Anderson	Elva kvinnor i ett hus (1975)	3:24
2.	"Var det med dej?"	Agnetha Fältskog, Bosse Carlgren	Elva kvinnor i ett hus (1975)	3:39
3.	"När du tar mig i din famn"	Agnetha Fältskog, Ingela Forsman	Tio år med Agnetha (1979)	4:07
4.	"Många gånger än"	Agnetha Fältskog, Peter Himmelstrand	När en vacker tanke blir en sång (1971)	2:35
5.	"En sång om sorg och glädje"	Mario Capuano, Giosy Capuano, Stig Anderson	Agnetha Fältskogs bästa (1973)	4:06
6.	"Dröm är dröm, och saga saga"	Gianluigi Guarnieri, Pier Paolo Preti, Stig Anderson	När en vacker tanke blir en sång (1971)	3:25
7.	"Doktorn!"	Agnetha Fältskog, Bosse Carlgren	Elva kvinnor i ett hus (1975)	2:51
8.	"Tack för en underbar, vanlig dag"	Agnetha Fältskog, Bosse Carlgren	Elva kvinnor i ett hus (1975)	2:39
9.	"Så glad som dina ögon"	Agnetha Fältskog, Kenneth Gärdestad	single only (1972)	3:00
10.	"Vart ska min kärlek föra" (Swedish version of I Don't Know How to Love Him)	Andrew Lloyd Webber, Tim Rice, Britt G Hallqvist	single only (1972)	3:20
11.	"Tio mil kvar till Korpilombolo"	Agnetha Fältskog, Peter Himmelstrand, Björn Ulvaeus	single only (1972)	3:00
12.	"Så här börjar kärlek" (with Björn Ulvaeus)	Peter Himmelstrand	Som jag är (1970)	2:31
13.	"Sången föder dig tillbaka"	Agnetha Fältskog, Börje Carlsson	När en vacker tanke blir en sång (1971)	3:13
14.	"Dom har glömt"	Agnetha Fältskog, Bosse Carlgren	Elva kvinnor i ett hus (1975)	3:49
15.	"Om tårar vore guld"	Agnetha Fältskog	Som jag är (1970)	3:27
16.	"Allting har förändrat sig"	Karl Gerhard Lundkvist	Agnetha Fältskog (1968)	3:10
17.	"Fram för svenska sommaren"	Jack E Lit, Lou Herscher, Ruth Grahm, Karl Gerhard Lundkvist	Agnetha Fältskog Vol. 2 (1969)	2:26
18.	"Jag var så kär"	Agnetha Fältskog	Agnetha Fältskog (1968)	3:19
Total length:				58:01

CD 2
No.	Title	Writer(s)	Original Album/Year	Length
1.	"Wrap Your Arms Around Me"	Mike Chapman, Holly Knight	Wrap Your Arms Around Me (1983)	5:16
2.	"Little White Secrets"	Ellen Schwartz, Roger Bruno, Susan Pomerantz	I Stand Alone (1987)	4:04
3.	"Can't Shake Loose"	Russ Ballard	Wrap Your Arms Around Me (1983)	4:21
4.	"The Heat Is On"	Florrie Palmer, Tony Ashton	Wrap Your Arms Around Me (1983)	3:53
5.	"If I Thought You'd Ever Change Your Mind"	John Cameron	My Colouring Book (2004)	3:13
6.	"I Stand Alone"	Peter Cetera, Bruce Gaitsch	I Stand Alone (1987)	4:48
7.	"Mr. Persuasion"	Susan Lynch, Larry Whitman	Wrap Your Arms Around Me (1983)	2:41
8.	"I Won't Let You Go"	Agnetha Fältskog, Eric Stewart	Eyes of a Woman (1985)	3:39
9.	"If You Need Somebody Tonight"	Diane Warren, Albert Hammond	I Stand Alone (1987)	3:32
10.	"Never Again" (with Tomas Ledin)	Tomas Ledin	The Human Touch (1982)	3:52
11.	"Let It Shine"	Austin Roberts, Bill LaBounty, Beckie Foster	I Stand Alone (1987)	3:58
12.	"Take Good Care of Your Children"	Tomas Ledin	Wrap Your Arms Around Me (1983)	3:43
13.	"Sometimes When I'm Dreaming"	Mike Batt	My Colouring Book (2004)	3:11
14.	"The Way You Are" (with Ola Håkansson)	Norell Oson Bard	single only (1986)	3:45
15.	"I Won't Be Leaving You"	Eric Stewart	Eyes of a Woman (1985)	5:34
16.	"When You Walk in the Room"	Jackie DeShannon	My Colouring Book (2004)	3:34
17.	"The Winner Takes It All" (with ABBA)	Benny Andersson, Björn Ulvaeus	Super Trouper (1980)	4:55
Total length:				67:59

== Charts and certifications ==
=== Weekly charts ===
Chart (2008)	Position
Swedish Albums (Sverigetopplistan)	4

=== Certifications ===
Region	Certification	Certified units/sales
Sweden (GLF)	Gold	20,000^{^}
^{^} Shipments figures based on certification alone.
