= Tio år med Agnetha =

Compilation album by Agnetha Fältskog
- Released: October 1979
- Recorded: 1967–1979
- Genre: Pop
- Length: 51:13
- Label: CBS Cupol
- Producer: Karl Gerhard Lundkvist; Björn Ulvaeus; Agnetha Fältskog

Agnetha Fältskog chronology
Elva kvinnor i ett hus (1975)	Tio år med Agnetha (1979)	Nu tändas tusen juleljus (1981)

Singles from Tio år med Agnetha
- 1. "När du tar mej i din famn" Released: October 1979

Tio år med Agnetha (Ten Years With Agnetha) is a 1979 compilation album by Swedish pop singer Agnetha Fältskog, one of the members of ABBA. The album, released when ABBA's international career was at its peak, features the most successful Swedish solo recordings Fältskog made before and during her career with the band and it was her last album on the CBS-Cupol label.

== Background ==
The album, released in October 1979, included one new recording, "När du tar mej i din famn" (When You Take Me in Your Arms), composed and produced by Fältskog herself in the Polar Studios and with the same musicians and sound engineers (Michael B. Tretow) as on contemporary ABBA recordings. The lyrics were written by Ingela "Pling" Forsman who since has become one of Sweden's most prolific and successful lyricists, with some twenty-five entries taking part in the Melodifestivalen, several of which have also competed in the Eurovision Song Contest. "När du tar mig i din famn" topped the Swedish radio chart Svensktoppen in late 1979 and was also released as a single, with Fältskog's very first hit "Jag var så kär" on the B-side. An English-language demo recording of the track, called "The Queen Of Hearts", was discovered in the CBS-Cupol archives in the late 1990s and was included on Fältskog's international greatest hits album That's Me (Polar Music/Universal Music) in 1998.

Tio År Med Agnetha contains three tracks from Fältskog's 1975 album Elva Kvinnor I Ett Hus, including her Swedish-language version of ABBA's worldwide hit "SOS", and was re-released in digitally remastered form by Sony BMG Music Entertainment in the mid 1990s.

"När du tar mej i din famn" was later covered by Swedish singer Lotta Engberg.

== Track listing ==
Side A
No.	Title	Lyrics	Music	Year, Album source	Length
1.	"Jag var så kär"	Agnetha Fältskog	Agnetha Fältskog	1967, Agnetha Fältskog	3:19
2.	"Utan dej mitt liv går vidare"	Agnetha Fältskog	Agnetha Fältskog	1968, Agnetha Fältskog	2:48
3.	"Allting har förändrat sej"	Karl Gerhard Lundkvist	Karl Gerhard Lundkvist	1968, Agnetha Fältskog	3:10
4.	"Fram för svenska sommaren"	Karl Gerhard Lundkvist	Jack E Lit, Lou Herscher, Ruth Grahm	1969, Agnetha Fältskog Vol. 2	2:25
5.	"Zigenarvän"	Bengt Haslum	Agnetha Fältskog	1969, Agnetha Fältskog Vol. 2	2:54
6.	"Om tårar vore guld"	Agnetha Fältskog	Agnetha Fältskog	1970, Som jag är	3:30
7.	"En sång och en saga" (Swedish version of "La première étoile")	Stig Anderson	Paul Mauriat, André Pascal	1970, Som jag är	3:40
8.	"Många gånger än"	Peter Himmelstrand	Agnetha Fältskog	1971, När en vacker tanke blir en sång	2:37
Total length:					24:30

Side B
No.	Title	Lyrics	Music	Year, Album source	Length
1.	"Dröm är dröm, och saga saga" (Swedish version of "Era bello il mio ragazzo")	Stig Anderson	Gianluigi Guarnieri, Pier Paolo Preti	1971, När en vacker tanke blir en sång	3:24
2.	"Vart ska min kärlek föra" (Swedish version of "I Don't Know How to Love Him")	Tim Rice, translated by Britt G. Hallqvist	Andrew Lloyd Webber	1972, single only	3:21
3.	"Så glad som dina ögon"	Kenneth Gärdestad	Agnetha Fältskog	1972, single only	2:59
4.	"En sång om sorg och glädje" (Swedish version of "Union Silver")	Stig Anderson	Mario Capuano, Giosy Capuna	1973, Agnetha Fältskogs Bästa	3:50
5.	"S.O.S." (Swedish version)	Stig Anderson	Benny Andersson, Björn Ulvaeus	1975, Elva kvinnor i ett hus	3:23
6.	"Doktorn!"	Bosse Carlgren	Agnetha Fältskog	1975, Elva kvinnor i ett hus	2:52
7.	"Tack för en underbar, vanlig dag"	Bosse Carlgren	Agnetha Fältskog	1975, Elva kvinnor i ett hus	2:38
8.	"När du tar mej i din famn"	Ingela Forsman	Agnetha Fältskog	1979, Tio år med Agnetha	4:12
Total length:					26:43

== Charts ==
Weekly chart for Tio år med Agnetha.
Chart (1979)	Peak position
Swedish Albums (Sverigetopplistan)	32
