= Agnetha Fältskogs bästa =

Agnetha Fältskogs Bästa

Greatest hits album by Agnetha Fältskog
- Released: 1973
- Recorded: 1967–1973
- Genre: Pop
- Length: 36:08
- Label: CBS Cupol
- Producer: Karl Gerhard Lundkvist; Björn Ulvaeus; Agnetha Fältskog

Agnetha Fältskog chronology
När en vacker tanke blir en sång (1971)	Agnetha Fältskogs Bästa (1973)	Elva kvinnor i ett hus (1975)

Singles from Agnetha Fältskogs Bästa
- 1. "En sång om sorg och glädje" Released: November 1973

Agnetha Fältskogs Bästa (Agnetha Fältskog's Best) is a compilation album by the Swedish pop singer and ABBA member Agnetha Fältskog. It was released in 1973 through CBS Cupol.

== Album information ==
To fill the gap between her last album När en vacker tanke blir en sång, dating back to 1971, and the next album which would eventually be called Elva kvinnor i ett hus and released in late 1975, Agnetha Fältskogs Bästa was released at the end of 1973. Because of the unexpected success of the quartet Björn, Benny, Agnetha & Frida in 1973, and the following year's victory in the Eurovision Song Contest with "Waterloo", the release of her next Swedish-language studio album was delayed until late 1975.

The album included many of her biggest hits from all her four previously released studio albums, starting with her breakthrough single "Jag var så kär", dating back to 1967. Out of the eleven songs included, ten had reached the top 10 of the important Swedish radio chart Svensktoppen. Despite her tight schedule with the group that would eventually be named ABBA (1973 saw them promoting the Ring Ring album as well as recording the Waterloo LP), Fältskog nevertheless managed to record two new songs for Agnetha Fältskogs Bästa: "En sång om sorg och glädje" and "Vi har hunnit fram till refrängen", a cover of "Our Last Song Together" by Neil Sedaka. Both would also be released on single, with "En sång om sorg och glädje" appearing on the A-side and also topping the Svensktoppen charts in late 1973 and early 1974. The recording session of those two tracks marked the first time that Fältskog produced her own recordings, a job which she enjoyed and eventually repeated on all of her future Swedish-language recordings.

== Track listing ==
Side one
No.	Title	Lyrics	Music	Year; Album source	Length
1.	"Jag var så kär"	Agnetha Fältskog	Fältskog	1967; Agnetha Fältskog	3:19
2.	"Utan dej mitt liv går vidare"	Fältskog	Fältskog	1968; Agnetha Fältskog	2:48
3.	"Allting har förändrat sej"	Karl Gerhard Lundkvist	Karl Gerhard Lundkvist	1968; Agnetha Fältskog	3:10
4.	"Zigenarvän"	Bengt Haslum	Fältskog	1969; Agnetha Fältskog Vol. 2	2:56
5.	"Om tårar vore guld"	Fältskog	Fältskog	1970; Som jag är	3:30
Total length:					15:48

Side two
No.	Title	Lyrics	Music	Year; Album source	Length
1.	"Många gånger än"	Peter Himmelstrand	Fältskog	1971; När en vacker tanke blir en sång	2:37
2.	"Dröm är dröm, och saga saga" (Swedish version of "Ero bello il mio ragazzo")	Stig Anderson	Gianluigi Guarnieri, Pier Paolo Preti	1971; När en vacker tanke blir en sång	3:24
3.	"Vart ska min kärlek föra" (Swedish version of "I Don't Know How to Love Him")	Britt G. Hallqvist	Andrew Lloyd Webber	1972; single only	3:21
4.	"Så glad som dina ögon"	Kenneth Gärdestad	Fältskog	1972; single only	3:01
5.	"En sång om sorg och glädje" (Swedish version of "Union Silver" (Middle of the Road's hit))	Anderson	Mario Capuano, Giosy Capuna	1973; previously unreleased	3:50
6.	"Vi har hunnit fram till refrängen" (Swedish version of "Our Last Song Together")	Anderson	Neil Sedaka, Howard Greenfield	1973; previously unreleased	4:08
Total length:					20:23

== Singles ==
Single sleeve for "Vart ska min kärlek föra"

Accompanying the release of Fältskog's first greatest hits album, two newly recorded tracks were released on single in late 1973. Besides that, the album also features two recordings from 1972 which were only released on single and cannot be found on any of Fältskogs studio albums. The first of those, "Vart ska min kärlek föra", is a Swedish version of "I Don't Know How to Love Him", originally from Andrew Lloyd Webber's hit musical Jesus Christ Superstar. Fältskog played the role of Maria Magdalena in the Swedish version of the musical, which opened in Gothenburg in February 1972. Fältskog's Swedish version, produced by Björn Ulvaeus, became her first number 1 hit on Svensktoppen.

Release date	A-side	B-side	Label number	Swedish charts peak
March 1972	Vart ska min kärlek föra	Nu ska du bli stilla	CS 284	-
November 1972	Så glad som dina ögon	Tio mil kvar till Korpilombolo	CS 291	-
November 1973	En sång om sorg och glädje	Vi har hunnit fram till refrängen	CS 297	-

Single sleeve for "En sång om sorg och glädje"

=== Svensktoppen ===
As mentioned above, Agnetha Fältskogs Bästa includes her first ever number 1 hit on Svensktoppen, "Vart ska min kärlek föra". Besides that, also the newly recorded "En sång om sorg och glädje" managed to top this chart for a total of seven weeks in the last weeks of 1973 and in early 1974. Staying on the chart for 14 weeks, it became one of her most successful hits.

Chart entry	Title	Peak position	Time in (weeks)
23 March 1972	Vart ska min kärlek föra	1	5
10 December 1972	Så glad som dina ögon	5	5
18 November 1973	En sång om sorg och glädje	1	14
