= De första åren =

Box set by Agnetha Fältskog
- Released: 21 December 2004
- Recorded: 1967–1979
- Genre: Pop
- Length: 266:42
- Label: Sony Music Entertainment (Sweden) AB, CUP 51-9318-2
- Producer: various

Agnetha Fältskog chronology
My Colouring Book (2004)	De första åren (2004)	My Very Best (2008)

De första åren (English: The Early Years) is a box set by Swedish pop singer and ABBA member Agnetha Fältskog, released in 2004.

It included all her official recordings between 1967 and 1979, except the TV specials recordings and her 16 recordings in German for which the master tapes are considered lost.

== Track listing ==
=== CD 1: Agnetha Fältskog (1968) ===
1. "Jag var så kär"
2. "Jag har förlorat dej"
3. "Utan dej mitt liv går vidare"
4. "Allting har förändrat sej"
5. "Försonade"
6. "Slutet gott allting gott"
7. "Tack Sverige"
8. "En sommar med dej"
9. "Snövit och de sju dvärgarna"
10. "Min farbror Jonathan"
11. "Följ med mig"
12. "Den jag väntat på"

=== CD 2: Agnetha Fältskog Vol. 2 (1969) ===
1. "Fram för svenska sommaren"
2. "Lek med dina dockor"
3. "Ge dej till tåls"
4. "Skål kära vän"
5. "Glöm honom"
6. "En gång fanns bara vi två"
7. "Hjärtats kronprins"
8. "Det handlar om kärlek"
9. "Som en vind kom du till mig"
10. "Señor Gonzales"
11. "Zigenarvän"
12. "Tag min hand låt oss bli vänner"

=== CD 3: Som jag är (1970) ===
1. "Som ett eko"
2. "När jag var fem"
3. "En sång och en saga"
4. "Tänk va' skönt"
5. "Ta det bara met ro"
6. "Om tårar vore guld"
7. "Hjärtats saga"
8. "Spela vår sång"
9. "Så här börjar kärlek
10. "Du ska minnas mig"
11. "Jag ska göra allt"
12. "Sov gott min lilla vän"

=== CD 4: När en vacker tanke blir en sång (1971) ===
1. "Många gånger än"
2. "Jag vill att du skall bli lyckig"
3. "Kungens vaktparad"
4. "Mitt sommarland"
5. "Nya ord"
6. "Jag skall inte fälla några tårar"
7. "Då finns du hos mig"
8. "Han lämnar mig för att komma till dig"
9. "Kanske var min kind lite het"
10. "Sången föder dig tillbaka"
11. "Tågen kan gå igen"
12. "Dröm är dröm, och saga saga"

=== CD 5: Elva kvinnor i ett hus (1975) ===
1. "S.O.S.
2. "En egen trädgård"
3. "Tack för en underbar, vanlig dag"
4. "Gulleplutt"
5. "Är du som han?"
6. "Och han väntar på mej"
7. "Doktorn!"
8. "Mina ögon"
9. "Dom har glömt"
10. "Var det med dej?"
11. "Visa i åttonde månaden"

=== CD 6 (bonus cd) ===
1. "När du tar mej i din famn" (A. Fältskog/Ingela "Pling" Forsman) – 4:07
2. "Tio mil kvar till Korpilombolo" (A. Fältskog/B.Ulvaeus/P.Himmelstrand) – 3:00
3. "Vart ska min kärlek föra" (Andrew Lloyd Webber/Tim Rice/Britt G Hallqvist) – 3:20
4. "En sång om sorg och glädje" (Mario Capuano/Giosy Capuano/Mike Shepstone/S. Anderson) – 3:45
5. "Någonting händer med mej" (Alan Moorehouse/Bo-Göran Edling) (with Jörgen Edman) – 2:35
6. "Litet solskenbarn" (Peter Howlett Smith/Karl Gerhard Lundkvist) (B-side of "Om tårar vore guld") – 3:10
7. "Så glad som dina ögon" (A. Fältskog/Kenneth Gärdestad) (B-side of "Tio mil kvar till Korpilombolo") – 3:00
8. "Nu ska du bli stilla" (Andrew Lloyd Webber/Tim Rice/Britt G Hallqvist) – 3:48
9. "Sjung denna sång" (Sonny Bono/Charles Greene/Brian Stone/A. Fältskog) (with Jörgen Edman) – 2:40
10. "Vi har hunnit fram till refängen" (Neil Sedaka/Howard Greenfield/S. Anderson) – 4:06
11. "Here For Your Love" (A. Fältskog/Bosse Carlgren) – 2:54
12. "Golliwog" (A. Fältskog/Bosse Carlgren) – 2:55
13. "The Queen Of Hearts" (A. Fältskog/Ingela "Pling" Forsman) – 3:20
14. "Det var så här det började" (Intervjuer och radioinslag) – 4:58
15. "Borsta tandtrollen bort" – 1:52

"Nu ska du bli stilla" and "Vart ska min kärlek föra" are reworked studio versions of the Jesus Christ Superstar (Swedish version 1972) stage versions.

=== Sources ===
- Booklet, Agnetha Fältskog: De Första Åren – 1967-1979

Jeffrey de Hart, research and liner notes; translation and research assistance: Peter Palmquist, Claes Davidsson, Mattias Olsson & Krister Henriksson; additional research: Frank Axelsson, Ulf Henningsson, Helga van de Kar, Anita Notenboom & Björn Waldenström
