= Geh' Mit Gott =

Compilation album

Geh' mit Gott

Compilation album by Agnetha Fältskog
- Released: 1994
- Recorded: 1968–1972
- Genre: Pop; schlager
- Length: 44:11
- Label: Royal Records International
- Producer: Dieter Zimmermann

Agnetha Fältskog chronology
I Stand Alone (1987)	Geh' mit Gott (1994)	My Love, My Life (1996)

Geh' mit Gott is a compilation album in German by Swedish singer Agnetha Fältskog, released in 1994 by Royal Records. The album contains Fältskog's German singles recorded for Metronome and CBS between 1968 and 1972. It was quickly deleted and is now a collector's item amongst ABBA fans. Presumably, the original master tapes for the German recordings are lost, as the sound on this CD has been transferred from the original singles. The compilation's first release of the German singles was Agnetha in Germany by Odoriko Music, in 1989.

== Recording session ==
'Robinson Crusoe' and 'Sonny Boy' were recorded in 1968 after the first album "Agnetha Fältskog". 'Señor Gonzales' and 'Concerto D'Amore' were recorded in early 1969, before the second album "Agnetha Fältskog Vol. 2". 'Mein schönster Tag' and 'Wie der Wind' are outtakes of that album. 'Tausend Wunder', 'Komm doch zu mir' and 'Ich denk' an dich' are outtakes of "När en vacker tanke blir en sång". 'Geh' mit Gott' is the "Sacco e Vanzetti" film theme "Here's to You", originally recorded by Joan Baez.

== Track listing ==
1. "Robinson Crusoe" (Giorgio Moroder) – 2:33
2. "Sonny Boy" (Hans Urlich Weigel) – 2:36
3. "Señor Gonzales" (Hans Urlich Weigel–Howard Evans–William Jenkins) – 2:28
4. "Mein schönster Tag" (Georg Buschor) – 2:59
5. "Concerto d'Amore" (Hans Blum) – 2:23
6. "Wie der Wind" (Hans Urlich Weigel) – 2:58
7. "Wer schreibt heut' noch Liebesbriefe" (Reneé Marcard) – 2:26
8. "Das Fest der Pompadour" (Reneé Marcard) – 2:36
9. "Fragezeichen mag ich nicht" (Hans Blum–Horst Bredow) – 2:34
10. "Wie der nächste Autobus" (Fred Jay) – 2:23
11. "Ein kleiner Mann in einer Flasche" (Billy Meshel–Curt List) – 2:41
12. "Ich suchte Liebe bei Dir" (Joachim Heider–Joachim Relin) – 2:47
13. "Geh' mit Gott" (Ennio Morricone–Fred Jay–Joan Baez) – 3:04
14. "Tausend Wunder" (Agnetha Fältskog–Ben Juris) – 3:22
15. "Komm' doch zu mir" (Robert Puschmann–Sven Linus) – 3:22
16. "Ich denk' an Dich" (Agnetha Fältskog–Ben Juris) – 3:00
