= Golliwog (disambiguation) =

Golliwog is a doll-like character.

Golliwog may also refer to:

- Golliwog (album), 2025 album by Billy Woods
- Golliwog (song), 1974 song by Agnetha Fältskog
- The Golliwogs, former name of Creedence Clearwater Revival
