= Anna Identici =

Italian pop/folk singer and television personality

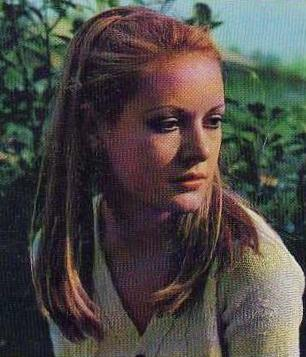
- Born: 30 July 1947 (age 79); Castelleone, Cremona, Italy
- Occupations: Singer, television personality

Anna Identici (born 30 July 1947) is an Italian pop/folk singer and television personality.

== Life and career ==
Born in Castelleone, Cremona, the daughter of an employee of the Ferrovie dello Stato, Identici started singing as a child, participating in a number of Festivals and talent shows. In 1964 she was entered into the competition at the Castrocaro Music Festival in which she reached the finals; the same year she made her television debut, as the assistant of Mike Bongiorno in the RAI variety show La fiera dei sogni.

Identici entered the Sanremo Music Festival six times between 1966 and 1973. In 1969, shortly before entering into the competition with the song "Il Treno", Identici attempted suicide and she was eventually replaced by Rosanna Fratello.

Identici's career turned in the 1970s, when she embraced a folk repertoire, with songs often characterized by political and social themes.

Swedish pop singer and ABBA member Agnetha Fältskog in her album När en vacker tanke blir en sång (1972) sang Anna Identici's hit Era bello il mio ragazzo (translated "Dröm är dröm, och saga saga").

== Discography ==
=== Album ===
- 1966: Un Bene Grande Così (Ariston, AR 0151)
- 1969: Anna Identici (Ariston, AR 10034)
- 1971: Alla Mia Gente (Ariston, AR 12052)
- 1972: Apro Gli Occhi Di Donna Su 'Sta Vita (Ariston, AR 12073)
- 1973: Adesso Sembra Solo Una Speranza (Ariston, AR 12103)
- 1974: E Per La Strada (Ariston, AR 12148)
- 1976: Anna Come Sei (Ariston, AR 12282)
- 1978: ...Vita (Ariston, AR 12332)
- 1986: Maria Bonita (Ricordi, SMRL 6361)
- 2002: Il Meglio (MR Music, MRCD 4247)

=== Singles ===
- 1965: "Lo Stile Adatto A Me" (Ariston Records, AR 019)
- 1965: "Un Bene Grande Così" (Ariston Records, AR 0040)
- 1965: "7 Uomini D'Oro" (Ariston Records, AR 098/AR O99)
- 1966: "Una Rosa Da Vienna" (Ariston Records, AR 0111)
- 1966: "Una Lettera Al Giorno" (Ariston Records, AR 0127)
- 1966: "Il Bene Che Mi Dai" (Ariston Records, AR 0145)
- 1966: "Tu Scendi Dalle Stelle" (Ariston Records, AR 0156)
- 1967: "Tanto Tanto Caro" (Ariston Records, AR 0192)
- 1967: "Non Passa Più" (Ariston Records, AR 0222–2035)
- 1967: "Al Bar Del Corso" (Ariston Records, AR 0222)
- 1968: "Quando M'Innamoro" (Ariston Records, AR 0242)
- 1968: "Non Calpestate I Fiori" (Ariston Records, AR 0254)
- 1968: "Sorri Sorri Sorridi" (Ariston Records, AR 0297)
- 1968: "Quando M'Innamoro" (Aristone Records, RR 4575)
- 1969: "Il Treno" (Ariston Records, AR 0304)
- 1969: "Bambino No No No" (Ariston Records, AR 0321)
- 1970: "Taxi" (Ariston Records, AR 0342)
- 1970: "La Lunga Storia Dell'Amore" (Ariston Records, AR 0364)
- 1970: "Distrattamente" (Ariston Records, AR 0366)
- 1971: "L'Uva Fogarina" (Ariston Records, AR 0512)
- 1972: "Se L'Operaia Non Va In Paradiso" (Ariston Records, AR 0545)
- 1973: "Mi Son Chiesta Tante Volte" (Ariston Records, AR 0585)
- 1974: "40 Giorni Di Libertà" (Ariston Records, AR 0650)
