= Sjung denna sång =

Compilation album by Agnetha Fältskog
- Released: August 1986
- Recorded: 1968–1979
- Genre: Pop
- Label: CBS Svenska AB
- Producer: various

Agnetha Fältskog chronology
| Eyes of a Woman (1985) | Sjung denna sång (1986) | Kom följ med i vår karusell (1987) |

Sjung denna sång (English: Sing this/that song) is a compilation released in August 1986 by Agnetha Fältskog.

== Track listing ==
1. "Tågen Kan Gå Igen"
2. "Kanske var Min Kind Lite Het"
3. "Golliwog"
4. "Han Lämnar Mig För Att Komma Till Dig"
5. "Då Finns Du Hos Mig"
6. "Mitt Sommarland"
7. "Sjung Denna Sång"
8. "Vi har Hunnit Fram Till Refrängen"
9. "Jag Vill Att Du Skall Bli Lycklig"
10. "Here For Your Love"
11. "Litet Solskensbarn"
12. "Nu Skall Du Bli Stilla"
13. "Kungens Vaktparad"
14. "Nya Ord"
15. "Någonting Händer Med Mig"
16. "Sången Föder Dig Tillbaka"
