= Ska vi plocka körsbär i min trädgård? =

Single by Ann-Christine Bärnsten
- A-side: "Ska vi plocka körsbär i min trädgård"
- B-side: "Tänk vad livet ändå smakar gott"
- Released: 1975
- Genre: schlager
- Label: Philips
- Songwriters: Börje Carlsson, Little Gerhard

"Ska vi plocka körsbär i min trädgård?" ('Shall we pick cherries in my garden') is a song written by Börje Carlsson and Little Gerhard (pseudonym for Karl Gerhard Lundkvist) and originally performed by Ann-Christine Bärnsten at Melodifestivalen 1975.

The song received attention due to its lyrics, which contained a high degree of sexual innuendo.

The song was tested for Svensktoppen, where it stayed for nine weeks during the period of 13 April – 8 June 1975, ending up 5th.

In 2004 The Honeypies recorded the song. Black Jack recorded the song on the 2010 album Festival. The same year the song was recorded by Drifters on the album Stanna hos mig.

Ann-Christine Bärnsten also performed the song during a Melodifestivalen 2010 pause act.

The single is also one of the titles in the book Tusen svenska klassiker (2009).
