= Om tårar vore guld =

Single by Agnetha Fältskog

from the album Som jag är
- B-side: "Litet solskensbarn"
- Released: March 1970
- Recorded: 21 January 1970
- Genre: Schlager, pop
- Length: 3:30
- Label: Cupol
- Songwriter: Agnetha Fältskog
- Producer: Karl Gerhard Lundkvist

Agnetha Fältskog singles chronology
"Fragezeichen mag ich nicht" (1970)	"Om tårar vore guld" (1970)	"Ta det bara med ro" / "Som ett eko" (1970)

Om tårar vore guld is a song written by Agnetha Fältskog and recorded by Fältskog. Fältskog's rendition was released as a single in March 1970, and also appeared on her album Som jag är the same year. The song charted at Svensktoppen for weeks between 12 April and 19 July 1970, peaking at third position.

== Cover versions ==
In 1971, the song was recorded in Danish as "Hvis tårer var guld" by Danish singer Susanne Lana. The Danish lyrics were written by Lana herself and Arne Bendiksen. The song ended 12th on the Danish year end chart of 1971. In 1990, the song was recorded by Stig Lorentz with Diana Thylin on the album Stig Lorentz med Diana.
