= Jesus Christ Superstar (1972 Swedish cast) =

Cast recording by 1972 Swedish cast
- Released: 1972
- Recorded: 1972
- Genre: Pop
- Label: Philips
- Producers: Johnny Reimar, Peder Kragerup, Birger Svan

Jesus Christ Superstar (1972 Swedish cast) is an album released on Philips in 1972. The album features the Swedish cast from Andrew Lloyd Webber and Tim Rice's rock opera, Jesus Christ Superstar. Jesus Christ was originally performed by Peter Winsnes on the Swedish opening at the Scandinavium arena in Göteborg. On tour as well as at the Johanneshov arena in Stockholm Jesus was played by Bruno Wintzell, who also sings the part of Jesus Christ at the Swedish cast's studio recording. Among other artists were featured in the Swedish cast by their respective roles: Arne Jansson as Judas Iscariot, Örjan Ramberg as Herod, Bernt Henziger as Pontius Pilate, and Agnetha Fältskog as Mary Magdalene.

== Cast ==
Björn Ulvaeus, Agnetha's husband at the time, had heard about the Swedish production, so he suggested that Agnetha should audition for the role of Mary Magdalene. The producers had a hard time choosing between Agnetha and Titti Sjöblom, due to the respect of Titti's mother, famous singer Alice Babs. In what was termed a compromise, Agnetha headlined in the role against Peter Winsnes as Jesus, with Sjöblom playing two nights and the matinee was performed by Adele Lipuma as Mary Magdalene. Titti Sjöblom, playing Mary Magdalene and Bruno Winzell as Jesus Christ went to perform on tour at Örebro and Gävle, after a compromise was made. In Stockholm Agnetha Fältskog returned as Mary Magdalene, with Bruno Winzell as Jesus. Peter Winsnes went back to the Falkoner Center and picked up his utterly successful performance in Copenhagen again. The Danish daily paper Politiken crowned him the "Super-Superstar".

The premiere was held on February 18 at The Scandinavium arena in Gothenburg and the ten performances run set an "untouchable Swedish record" playing to 74.000 people.

- Judas Iscariot: Arne Jansson
- Jesus Christ: Bruno Wintzell
- Mary Magdalene: Agnetha Fältskog
- Priest: Håkan Mohede
- Caiaphas: Carl-Johan Sacklén
- Annas: Hasse Jenbratt
- Simon Zealotes: Dan Tillberg
- Pontius Pilate: Bernt Henziger
- Peter: Göran Runfelt
- King Herod: Örjan Ramberg
- Maid by the Fire: Elisabeth Barkstedt
- Old Man: Bo Maniette
- Ensemble: Stefan Ahlquist, Leif Axel, Lars-Åke Bly, Ylva Bång, Kersti Fernström, Kerstin Fält, Tommy Hansson, Linda Hellström, Funny Holmerin, Gert Honnér, Inga Jansson, Adele Lipuma, Bengt Lundblad, Moa Myrén, Anita Nyman, Lars Nellde, Jan Petrus, Tomas Paulson, Björn Pousette, Karin Samuelson, Titti Sjöblom, Jon Wijk.

== Track listing ==
All lyrcis are translated by Britt G. Hallqvist.

Side one
No.	Title	Length
1.	"Ouvertyr"	4:05
2.	"Ditt Folk Har Du Förlett" (Judas)	4:00
3.	"Vad Står På?/Hon Går På Gatan" (Jesus, Judas, Lärjungarna, kvinnor och män)	4:44
4.	"Nu Ska Du Bli Stilla" (Maria Magdalena, Judas, Lärjungarna, kvinnor och män)	4:20
5.	"Jesus Må Dö" (Kaifas, Hannas, Präster och deras följe)	5:25

Side two
No.	Title	Length
1.	"Hosianna" (Kaifas, Jesus och ensemble)	2:00
2.	"Simon Ivraren/Ack, Mitt Jerusalem" (Simon, Jesus och ensemble)	4:42
3.	"Pilatus Dröm" (Pilatus)	1:35
4.	"I Templet" (Jesus och ensemble)	4:38
5.	"Allting Är Allright" (Maria Magdalena)	0:28
6.	"Vart Ska Min Kärlek Föra" (Maria Magdalena och Jesus)	3:24
7.	"Dömd För Alltid" (Judas, Hannas, Kaifas och Prästerna)	6:03

Side three
No.	Title	Length
1.	"Nattvarden" (Jesus, Judas och Lärjungarna)	6:55
2.	"I Getsemane" (Jesus)	6:12
3.	"Jesus Fängslas" (Petrus, Jesus, Lärjungarna, Reporter, Kaifas och Hannas)	3:18
4.	"Petrus Förnekar Jesus" (Petrus, Kvinnan Vid Bålet, en Soldat, En Gammal Man och Maria Magdalena)	1:20
5.	"Inför Pilatus" (Pilatus, Soldater, Jesus och ensemble)	2:50
6.	"Herodes Sång" (Herodes)	2:58

Side four
No.	Title	Length
1.	"Judas Död" (Judas, Johannes och Kaifas)	4:58
2.	"Åter Inför Pilatus" (Pilatus, Kaifas, Jesus och ensemble)	6:34
3.	"Superstar" (Judas Röst och ensemble)	4:03
4.	"Korsfästelsen" (Jesus och ensemble)	4:05
5.	"Johannes Evangeliet Kap. 19, Vers 41"	2:20

== Released ==
- LP: © 1972 Philips 6675 002
- CD: © 1995 Royal Records 19950001

== Sources ==
- Liner notes of the CD.
- Booklet, Agnetha Fältskog: Agnetha Fältskog De Första Åren
- Bright Lights Dark Shadows – The Real Story Of ABBA by Carl Magnus Palm
