= Golliwog (song) =

Single by Agnetha Fältskog
- B-side: "Here For Your Love"
- Released: 1974
- Recorded: 1974
- Genre: Pop
- Length: 2:50
- Label: Cupol; Epic
- Songwriter(s): Agnetha Fältskog; Bosse Carlgren
- Producer(s): Agnetha Fältskog

Agnetha Fältskog singles chronology
"En sång om sorg och glädje" (1974)	"Golliwog" (1974)	"Dom har glömt" (1975)

"Golliwog" (also known as "Gulleplutt", English: "Sweetheart") is the debut English-language single by Swedish singer Agnetha Fältskog.

== Background ==
Golliwog was the first attempt by Fältskog to enter the charts outside Sweden; the eight German-language music singles she released in her early solo career, also did not enter the charts. With "Golliwog", the intention was that, not only Germany, but all of Europe would get to know her as a solo artist in her own right. The "Golliwog" single was not successful in either Sweden or Europe, despite that she was already known as a member of ABBA.

The B-side of Golliwog was also recorded in English as Here For Your Love ("Tio Mil Kvar Till Korpilombolo"), at the marketing suggestion of Fältskog's record company, Cupol. During Fältskog's time with ABBA, she had been against releasing English versions of her songs, while lyricist Bosse Carlgren was not too keen on his English lyrics; he had reportedly thought of the word as a "ragdoll" when he looked up the dictionary.

As Gulleplutt, the song was released as the B-side to Fältskog's Swedish-language single, "Dom har glömt" ("They've Forgotten"), a year later.
