= Ann-Christine Bärnsten =

Swedish singer and writer

- Born: 10 July 1957 (age 69)
- Occupations: singer, writer
- Known for: Ska vi plocka körsbär i min trädgård

Margareta Ann-Christine Bärnsten (born 10 July 1957) is a Swedish singer and writer, who has written several detective stories.

As a student Bärnsten attended the Adolf Fredrik's Music School, a high-profile song-and-chorus school in Stockholm. As a singer, she has participated at Melodifestivalen 1975 with the song Ska vi plocka körsbär i min trädgård, which ended up 9th.

== Svensktoppen hit songs ==
- "Ska vi plocka körsbär i min trädgård" – 1975

== Bibliography ==
- Döden är en schlager - 2005
- Gröna villan - 2007
