= Sometimes When I'm Dreaming =

Single by Agnetha Fältskog

from the album My Colouring Book
- Released: 2004
- Recorded: 2003–2004
- Genre: Easy listening, pop
- Length: 3:00
- Label: WEA
- Songwriter: Mike Batt
- Producers: Agnetha Fältskog, Anders Neglin

Agnetha Fältskog singles chronology
"When You Walk in the Room" (2004)	"Sometimes When I'm Dreaming" (2004)	"The One Who Loves You Now" (2013)

"Sometimes When I'm Dreaming" is a song written by Mike Batt, a songwriter for The Wombles. It was originally recorded by Art Garfunkel for his 1984 studio album The Art Garfunkel Album.

The song was covered by ABBA's Agnetha Fältskog for her 2004 album, My Colouring Book. The song was originally intended to be the third single from the album, but because the LP had already disappeared from many album charts at the end of 2004, these plans were shelved. One cited reason is Agnetha's reluctance to promote the album (other than through music videos or telephone interviews), such as her refusal to appear in the German television show, Wetten dass..?.

Despite this, several Swedish radio stations did receive a promotional CD single that featured a remix of the song by Soundfactory, which was popularized on the internet and appeared on many bootleg CDs. The remix featured a slower tempo, with dance-pop instrumentals and backing vocals.

== Other cover versions ==
Katie Melua later covered this song on her 2005 studio album Piece By Piece (Special Bonus Edition).

== Formats and track listings ==
The song was released as a promo only which was issued to some Swedish radio-stations:

- CD-Promo-single
1. "Sometimes When I'm Dreaming" [Soundfactory-Radio-Edit] 3:00
