= Kom följ med i vår karusell =

Studio album by Agnetha Fältskog and Christian Ulvaeus
- Released: 1987
- Recorded: January – April 1987
- Genre: Children's music; novelty
- Length: 34:53
- Label: WEA, Agnetha Fältskog Production
- Producer: Agnetha Fältskog; Michael B. Tretow

Agnetha Fältskog and Christian Ulvaeus chronology
Eyes of a Woman (1985)	Kom följ med i vår karusell (1987)	I Stand Alone (1987)

Singles from Kom följ med i vår karusell
- 1. "På Söndag" Released: 1987; 2. "Karusellvisan" Released: 1987

Kom följ med i vår karusell (Come Join Us On Our Carousel) is a children's album released in early 1987, recorded by Swedish singer and ABBA member Agnetha Fältskog and her son Christian Ulvaeus, nine years old at the time. The album was co-produced by Fältskog and ABBA sound engineer Michael B. Tretow. The record featured the single releases "På söndag" (On Sunday) and "Mitt namn är Blom" (My Name Is Blom).

In 1988, it was nominated for Swedish music prize Grammis in a category 'Barn' (For Children).

The album was re-released in 2003 as "Guldkorn" (Gold Nuggets) and is available in Sweden only.

== Track listing ==
1. Karusellvisan (Stig Olin) – 3:59
2. Våra Valpar (Gullan Bornemark) – 2:53
3. Mitt Namn är Blom (M.Tretow) – 1:43
4. Vattenvisan (Lille bror söderlundh–Lennart Hellsing) – 2:18
5. Maskeradbalen (H.Å.Gäfert–Lennart Hellsing) – 2:01
6. Pelle Jöns (Lars Boldmann–BrittG.Hallquist) – 1:11
7. Tre Vita Råttor (H.Å.Gäfert–Lennart Hellsing) – 2:46
8. Önskevisa (Rutger Gunnarsson–Lennart Hellsing) – 2:14
9. På Söndag (Stig Olin) – 2:32
10. Smurferifabriken (Nils Fläcke–Claes Vogel) – 1:46
11. Min Ponny (Gullan Bornemark) – 2:38
12. Nicko Ticko Tinn (Knut Brodin–Lennart Hellsing) – 1:40
13. Jag Vill Va' som Du (R.B.Sherman–R.M.Sherman–Martin Söderhjelm) – 3:50
14. Jag är Kung (Gullan Bornemark) – 2:13
15. Alla Färger (Rutger Gunnarsson–A.M.Engström) – 2:15
16. Liten Och Trött (K.Aneby–M.Forsberg) – 1:57

== Personnel ==
- Agnetha Fältskog – vocals
- Christian Ulvaeus – vocals
- Lasse Wellander – guitar
- Rutger Gunnarsson – bass
- Hasse Gardemar, Peter Ljung – keyboards
- Åke Sundqvist – drums
- Christian Ulvaeus – cover drawing back
- Tor Svae – cover drawing front
- Rutger Gunnarsson – arranger
- Tore Wiman – photography
