= My Colouring Book =

2004 album by Agnetha Fältskog

Studio album by Agnetha Fältskog
- Released: 19 April 2004
- Recorded: February 2003 – January 2004
- Studio: Atlantis, Unit 7 and Hammarby Studio, Stockholm, Sweden
- Genre: Adult contemporary; easy listening
- Length: 42:07
- Label: WEA
- Producer: Agnetha Fältskog; Anders Neglin; Dan Strömkvist

Agnetha Fältskog chronology
That's Me (1998)	My Colouring Book (2004)	De första åren (2004)

Singles from My Colouring Book
- 1. "If I Thought You'd Ever Change Your Mind" Released: 12 April 2004; 2. "When You Walk in the Room" Released: 14 June 2004; 3. "Sometimes When I'm Dreaming" Released: 2004

My Colouring Book is the eleventh studio album by Swedish singer and songwriter Agnetha Fältskog, released on 19 April 2004 by Warner Music Sweden. It was her fourth English-language album and her first release in seventeen years, following 1987's I Stand Alone. The album features covers of Fältskog's favourite songs, mainly from her youth in the 1960s. It was well received by both ABBA fans and the general music press.

The singles from the album were "If I Thought You'd Ever Change Your Mind" (#11 in the UK) and "When You Walk in the Room" (UK #34), though "Sometimes When I'm Dreaming" was issued in Sweden as a promo-only single. The album reached #12 in the UK, her highest-charting album there until May 2013, when she reached #6 with her album "A".

== Background and production ==
After releasing I Stand Alone in 1987, Fältskog went into an unofficial retirement, withdrawing from the public eye and ceasing the creation of new music. For the next ten years, she refused to sing or play music, stating, "I was tired… I didn’t feel there were any challenges in music for me." In 1996, she published her autobiography As I Am, accompanied by the compilation album My Love, My Life. Three years later, Mamma Mia!, the musical based on ABBA songs, premiered. Its enduring success and popularity ultimately helped draw Fältskog out of retirement to record My Colouring Book.

The new album featured the participation of a full orchestra and was co-produced by Fältskog with Swedish musicians Anders Neglin and Dan Strömkvist. According to The Observer, she spent four years gathering a vast collection of rare records and reissues to aid in its creation.

== Critical reception ==
Professional ratings
Review scores
Source	Rating
AllMusic	3.5/5 stars
The Guardian	4/5 stars
The Observer	3/5 stars

On 16 April 2004, Caroline Sullivan of The Guardian gave My Colouring Book four stars, stating that Fältskog had a "a vulnerability that gets under the skin of a song," and that her "soaring sentimentality" evoked Cillia Shaw and Sandie Shaw in their "mini-skirted pomp." Sullivan concluded that, as a mix of standard and obscure songs, the album proved that ABBA's "sense of melodrama" was not only the work of "the bearded one." That same day, however, Andy Gill of The Independent described the album as "lacklustre and uninspired", claimed that its "best" tracks were "characterless," while the worst bordered on the "emetic," and found that it "reeked" of "lazy opportunism."

Two days later, Kitty Empire of The Observer remarked that time had not diminished Fältskog's "perfect voice," noting that the singer could still infuse certain lines with "unutterable pathos." Although she acknowledged that the album was not flawless, as it could not "escape a pall of cheesiness," she concluded that not even "the over-egged productions" could "blight" her charms." That same day, Mark Edwards of The Times expressed disappointment at his prediction that My Colouring Book would be a "low-key" release, as Fältskog voice was still an "impressive pop instrument," and the album had "some great songs."

On April 20, Michael Osborn of BBC News observed that the album's lack of new material helped Fältskog retain her "mysterious, elusive air after years of seclusion." He described the album's lead single, "If I Thought You'd Ever Change Your Mind", as a "delicately-wrought" song that reflected the album's "old-fashioned sense of song recording," but ultimately called Fältskog's "heavily masked return" a "missed opportunity" to "recapture ... hearts." Five days later, Liz Hoggard wrote a separate review in The Observer, noting that the "1960s mask" allowed "the reclusive Fältskog to tackle some fairly dark stuff." She portrayed the singer as a "misunderstood princess in the tower" and concluded that with the "anthemic" "What Now My Love?" "she might finally have the strength to leave the castle after all."

In a retrospective review, AllMusic's Bruce Eder said that Faltskog's voice retained the "simple purity of tone and expression" that she had brought to ABBA, even when the production did not "parallel" anything the group had done. He also praised the sound as"excellent" and the playing as "impeccable." On the album's 15th anniversary, Mark Elliott wrote on uDiscoverMusic that My Colouring Book revealed a "softer, more fragile timbre" in Faltskog's voice, which bathed the album in "a warm, nostalgic haze." He highlighted how, at first listen, it seemed like a more "personal" album than anyone would expect.

== Commercial performance ==
It was announced that around 500,000 copies of the album were sold worldwide. During 2004, the album went silver in the UK for sales of over 60,000, while in Fältskog's home country of Sweden, during its first week of release, a high 64,000 copies were sold. My Colouring Book also reached #6 in Germany in May 2004.

== Track listing ==
No.	Title	Writer(s)	Length
1.	"My Colouring Book"	Fred Ebb; John Kander	3:27
2.	"When You Walk in the Room"	Jackie DeShannon	3:36
3.	"If I Thought You'd Ever Change Your Mind"	John Cameron	3:15
4.	"Sealed with a Kiss"	Gary Geld; Peter Udell	2:34
5.	"Love Me with All Your Heart"	Rafael Gastón Pérez; Sunny Skylar	3:11
6.	"Fly Me to the Moon"	Bart Howard	2:49
7.	"Past, Present and Future"	Arthur Butler; Jerry Leiber; George "Shadow" Morton	3:12
8.	"A Fool Am I"	Flavio Carraresi; Alberto Testa; Peter Callander	3:32
9.	"I Can't Reach Your Heart"	Ted Murry; Benny Davis	2:39
10.	"Sometimes When I'm Dreaming"	Mike Batt	3:15
11.	"The End of the World"	Arthur Kent; Sylvia Dee	2:35
12.	"Remember Me"	Chris Andrews	3:05
13.	"What Now My Love"	Gilbert Bécaud; Pierre Delanoë; Carl Sigman	4:49
Total length:			42:07

== Personnel ==
Adapted from European CD release.

Musicians

- Agnetha Fältskog – lead vocals, backing vocals (1, 3, 4, 5, 9, 11, 13), vocal arrangements (3, 4, 5)
- Anders Neglin – Rhodes piano (1, 6, 9, 12), harmonium (1, 4), orchestra bells (1, 2, 5, 9, 11), string arrangements and conductor (1–10, 13), grand piano (2–13), Hammond B3 organ (2, 4, 12, 13), horn arrangements (2, 3, 7, 8, 11, 12, 13), keyboards (3, 5, 8, 13), castanets (4), Wurlitzer electric piano (5, 11, 12), violin arrangements (7), Farfisa organ (11)
- Magnus Bengtsson – guitars (1, 2, 5, 12, 13), acoustic guitar (6), mandolin (12)
- Lasse Wellander – acoustic guitar (1, 6, 8, 9, 12), guitars (3, 5, 7, 13), electric guitar (8)
- Johan Lindström – pedal steel guitar (1, 5, 6, 13), guitars (4, 7, 11, 13), Omnichord (7), electric guitar (8), Vox Jaguar organ (11)
- Johan Granström – acoustic bass (1, 6–9), bass guitar (2–5, 11, 12, 13)
- Dan Strömkvist – drums (1–9, 11, 12, 13), percussion (1–9, 12, 13), vocal arrangements (1, 3, 4, 5, 8, 12), BGV arrangements (2), additional keyboards (4, 8, 9), horn arrangements (11)
- Jörgen Stenberg – bass drum (6), additional orchestra percussion (8)
- Wojtek Goral – tenor saxophone (2, 11, 12), bass clarinet (2), baritone saxophone (11, 12)
- Anders Wiborg – bass trombone (2, 8, 12)
- Per Larsson – trombone (2, 8, 12)
- Urban Wiborg – trombone (2, 8, 12)
- Joakim Agnas – trumpet (2, 8, 12)
- Leif Lindvall – trumpet (2, 8, 12)
- Jesper Harryson – oboe (3)
- Johan Ahlin – French horn (3, 7, 8, 13)
- Magnus Franzén – French horn (3, 7, 8, 13)
- Christian Bergqvist – violin solo (7)
- Svea Strings – strings (1–10, 13)
- Andreas Hansson – string conductor (1–10, 13)
- Christina Wirdegren-Alin – string contractor (1–10, 13)
- Karl-Johan Ankarblom – music copyist (1–10, 13)
- Johanna Nyström – backing vocals (1, 3, 5, 8)
- Patrik Lundström – backing vocals (2, 4, 8)
- Sofia Tretow – backing vocals (2, 5, 7)
- Linda Ulvaeus – backing vocals (2, 5, 7)
- Sarah Dawn Finer – backing vocals (4, 5, 8, 12)
- Britta Bergström – backing vocals (5, 8)
- Carl-Magnus Carlsson – backing vocals (12)

Production

- Agnetha Fältskog – producer, arrangements, concept, liner notes
- Anders Neglin – producer, arrangements
- Dan Strömkvist – producer, arrangements, engineer
- Janne Hansson – engineer
- Alar Suurna – mixing
- Christofer Stannow – mastering
- Jimmy Backius – photography
- Destrito – design

== Charts ==
=== Weekly charts ===
Weekly chart performance for My Colouring Book
Chart (2004)	Peak position
Australian Albums (ARIA)	50
Austrian Albums (Ö3 Austria)	25
Belgian Albums (Ultratop Flanders)	38
Danish Albums (Hitlisten)	5
Dutch Albums (Album Top 100)	11
European Albums (Billboard)	9
Finnish Albums (Suomen virallinen lista)	2
German Albums (Offizielle Top 100)	6
Irish Albums (IRMA)	57
Norwegian Albums (VG-lista)	25
Scottish Albums (OCC)	16
Swedish Albums (Sverigetopplistan)	1
Swiss Albums (Schweizer Hitparade)	17
UK Albums (OCC)	12

=== Year-end charts ===
Year-end chart performance for My Colouring Book
Chart (2004)	Position
Dutch Albums (Album Top 100)	89
Swedish Albums (Sverigetopplistan)	10

== Certifications and sales ==
Region	Certification	Certified units/sales
Finland (Musiikkituottajat)	Gold	15,899
Sweden (GLF)	Platinum	60,000^{^}
United Kingdom (BPI)	Silver	60,000^{^}
Summaries
Worldwide	—	500,000
^{^} Shipments figures based on certification alone.
