= Agnetha Fältskog (album) =

Studio album by Agnetha Fältskog
- Released: 13 November 1968
- Recorded: October 1967 – 1968
- Studio: Philips (Stockholm)
- Genre: Schlager
- Length: 33:29
- Label: Cupol (CLP 64)
- Producer: Karl Gerhard Lundkvist

Agnetha Fältskog chronology
Agnetha Fältskog (1968)	Agnetha Fältskog Vol. 2 (1969)

Singles from Agnetha Fältskog
- 1. "Följ med mej" / "Jag var så kär" Released: November 1967; 2. "Slutet gott, allting gott" / "Utan dej" Released: March 1968; 3. "En sommar med dig" / "Försonade" Released: 1968; 4. "Den jag väntat på" / "Allting har förändrat sig" Released: August 1968; 5. "Svövit och de sju dvärgarna" / "Min farbror Jonathan" Released: December 1968

Agnetha Fältskog is the debut studio album by Swedish pop singer and future ABBA member Agnetha Fältskog. It was released in Sweden in early 1968 through Cupol Records.

== Album information ==
Fältskog had been singing with the local Swedish "dansband" Bengt Engharts in Jönköping (southern Sweden) for quite a while when the group decided to send a tape of demos to Cupol Records in autumn of 1967. Singer, producer and A & R man Little Gerhard (né Karl-Gerhard Lundqvist) listened to the tape which included Fältskog's song "Jag var så kär". Lundqvist was so impressed with the song and Fältskog's voice that he called her at the car firm where she was working at the time and offered her a recording contract, only as a solo singer, without the band.

Eventually, Fältskog's first recording session took place on 16 October 1967, at Philips Studio in Stockholm. This recording session produced four songs, which would all end up on her first album: "Jag var så kär" and "Utan dej mitt liv går vidare" (both composed by Agnetha herself) as well as "Följ med mig" and "Slutet gott, allting gott". "Jag var så kär" and "Följ med mig" were eventually released as Fältskog's debut single (CUPOL CS 45-211) in November 1967, the latter up-tempo track being its A-side. But it was Fältskog's self-penned tear-jerker "Jag var så kär" which became her first entry and also number three on the all-important radio chart Svensktoppen in January 1968. After this success and with selling more than 80,000 copies, the single topped Sweden's official sales chart at that time, Kvällstoppen. After the following success of the tracks "Utan dej mitt liv går vidare", "Allting har förändrat sig", "Den jag väntat på" and "Snövit och de sju dvärgarna", most of them composed by Fältskog herself, Cupol released her debut album in the spring of 1968, containing all tracks previously issued on these singles as well as a few new recordings.

She wrote "Försonade" and submitted it to Melodifestivalen (Swedish Eurovision heat) for singer Gunnar Wiklund, but it was rejected. The song could also be heard in the 2008 film Låt den rätte komma in (Let the Right One In) in the scene where Eli plays it on a tape recorder for Oskar.

The album has since been re-issued both on CD and iTunes.

== Track listing ==
Side one
No.	Title	Lyrics	Music	Title (English translation)	Length
1.	"Jag var så kär"	Agnetha Fältskog	Agnetha Fältskog	"I Was So in Love"	3:19
2.	"Jag har förlorat dej"	Agnetha Fältskog	Dieter Zimmermann	"I Have Lost You"	3:25
3.	"Utan dej mitt liv går vidare"	Agnetha Fältskog	Agnetha Fältskog	"My Life Goes on Without You"	2:49
4.	"Allting har förändrat sej"	Karl Gerhard Lundkvist	Karl Gerhard Lundkvist	"Everything Has Changed"	3:09
5.	"Försonade"	Agnetha Fältskog	Agnetha Fältskog	"Reconciled"	2:56
6.	"Slutet gott, allting gott" (Swedish version of "Honey Stuff")	Stig Anderson	Ben Wilson, Judy Lynn, Lynn Wilson	"All's Well That Ends Well"	1:43
Total length:					17:25

Side two
No.	Title	Lyrics	Music	Title (English translation)	Length
1.	"Tack Sverige"	Agnetha Fältskog	Dieter Zimmermann	"Thank You, Sweden"	3:00
2.	"En sommar med dej"	Ingvar Fältskog	Ingvar Fältskog	"A Summer with You"	3:20
3.	"Snövit och de sju dvärgarna"	Agnetha Fältskog	Dieter Zimmermann	"Snow White and the Seven Dwarfs"	3:07
4.	"Min farbror Jonathan"	Agnetha Fältskog	Dieter Zimmermann	"My Uncle Jonathan"	2:31
5.	"Följ med mig" (Swedish version of "Hello Love")	Agnetha Fältskog	Mark Anthony	"Follow Me"	1:35
6.	"Den jag väntat på" (Swedish version of "Your Love Is Everywhere")	Agnetha Fältskog	Tony Hatch, Jackie Trent	"The One I Waited For"	2:24
Total length:					16:02

Bonus tracks (Royal Records release (1999))
No.	Title	Lyrics	Music	Title (English translation)	Length
13.	"Sjung denna sång" (med Jörgen Edman; Swedish version of "Sing C'est La Vie")	Agnetha Fältskog	Sonny Bono, Charles Greene, Brian Stone	"Sing This Song"	2:40
14.	"Någonting händer med mig" (med Jörgen Edman; Swedish version of "Something Happened to Me")	Bo-Göran Edling	Alan Moorehouse	"Something's Happening with Me"	2:35
15.	"Borsta tandrollen bort"	Agnetha Fältskog	Agnetha Fältskog	"Brush the Tooth-Trolls Away"	1:52

== Singles ==
Out of the 12 tracks recorded for Agnetha Fältskog's debut studio album, a total of ten songs were released as either single a-side or b-side in 1967 and 1968. Only two of them charted on the official Swedish sales chart at that time, Kvällstoppen. Also included in the following list is Agnetha's duet single with Jörgen Edman, which was released in 1968 but did not appear on the original album.

Agnetha Fältskog's debut single "Följ med mig"/"Jag var så kär"

Release date	A-side	B-side	Label number	Swedish charts peak
November 1967	Följ med mig (Follow me)	Jag var så kär (I was so in love)	CS 211	1
March 1968	Slutet gott, allting gott (Well that ends well)	Utan dej mitt liv går vidare (Without you my life goes on)	CS 217	-
1968	En sommar med dig (A summer with you)	Försonade (Reconciled)	CS 233	-
August 1968	Den jag väntat på (The one I waited for)	Allting har förändrat sig (Everything has changed)	CS 236	7
1968	Sjung denna sång (Sing This Song) (with Jörgen Edman)	Nånting händer med mig (Something happens to me) (with Jörgen Edman)	CS 239	-
1968	Snövit och de sju dvärgarna (Snow white and the seven dwarfs)	Min farbror Jonathan (My uncle Jonathan)	CS 244	-

=== Svensktoppen ===
Throughout her pre-ABBA solo career, Fältskog's success was mostly visible by looking at her entries in the famous Swedish Svensktoppen chart. This chart is not based on sales figures but compiled by a jury instead. A total of five songs of hers made that hitlist in 1968. It is interesting to mention that mostly her B-sides eventually made the Svensktoppen top 10.

Chart entry	Title	Peak position	Time in (weeks)
28 January 1968	Jag var så kär (I was so in love)	3	7
31 March 1968	Utan dej mitt liv går vidare (Without you my life goes on)	8	2
15 September 1968	Den jag väntat på (The one I waited for)	9	1
22 September 1968	Allting har förändrat sig (Everything has changed)	2	7
1 December 1968	Nånting händer med mig (Something happens to me) (with Jörgen Edman)	9	1

== Sources ==
- Booklet, Agnetha Fältskog: Agnetha Fältskog De Första Åren
- Bright Lights Dark Shadows – The Real Story of ABBA by Carl Magnus Palm
