= Elva kvinnor i ett hus =

Studio album by Agnetha Fältskog
- Released: 1 December 1975
- Recorded: 1973–1975
- Studios: Glen and Europafilm (Stockholm)
- Genre: Pop
- Length: 34:26
- Label: Cupol (CLPS 351)
- Producer: Agnetha Fältskog

Agnetha Fältskog chronology
Agnetha Fältskogs bästa (1973)	Elva kvinnor i ett hus (1975)	Tio år med Agnetha (1979)

Singles from Elva kvinnor i ett hus
- 1. "Dom har glömt" Released: Summer 1975; 2. "S.O.S. (Swedish version)" Released: Autumn 1975

Elva kvinnor i ett hus (English: Eleven Women in a House) is the fifth studio album by Swedish pop singer Agnetha Fältskog, released on 1 December 1975 by Cupol Records.

== Album information ==
The album was recorded during the same period as when her bandmate Anni-Frid Lyngstad made her Swedish number-one album Frida ensam – both were recorded between sessions and a very busy promotion schedule for the ABBA albums Waterloo and ABBA. Elva kvinnor i ett hus was originally slotted for release in 1973, but following Agnetha's pregnancy that year and her later unexpected success with ABBA, the record was postponed and not released until late 1975. By then four years had passed since the release of her last Swedish solo album, När en vacker tanke blir en sång (When a Beautiful Thought Becomes a Song).

Fältskog composed all but one of the songs herself with lyrics by Swedish writer, journalist, and lyricist Bosse Carlgren. The only exception was the Swedish version of the ABBA song "SOS", which was written by Benny Andersson, Stig Anderson, and Björn Ulvaeus, Fältskog's husband at the time. Fältskog's record company Cupol insisted on including a Swedish version of an ABBA song to increase album sales. After two recordings in 1973 Elva kvinnor i ett hus marked the first time that Agnetha produced an entire album herself.

Elva kvinnor i ett hus was first released on CD in 2004 as part of her De Första Åren (The Early Years) 6-CD box set. It also appeared in the Agnetha Fältskog edition of Original Album Classics, part of a larger series of identically named box sets issued by Sony Music in 2008.

=== Recording process ===
The original album design was very different from the eventual release. Fältskog and Carlgren had planned to call the album Tolv kvinnor i ett hus (Twelve Women In A House), with each song describing one of twelve women who lead very different lives living in the same house. The package would have included a gatefold sleeve with artwork by Carlgren picturing the twelve fictitious women as well as several photos of Fältskog herself, but due to the success of ABBA the singer had less time to write and record her own songs. At one point it seemed uncertain that the album would ever be finished, which led to the record company cutting the production budget and making it impossible to release the album with the lavish gatefold sleeve and accompanying artwork. In the end there were only ten songs written by Fältskog, coupled with the opening track "SOS", a song that neither fit nor was part of the original concept.

The melodies on Elva kvinnor i ett hus are generally seen as more complex and more influenced by contemporary pop and rock than on Fältskog's earlier albums, which had been in the fairly lightweight schlager genre; and Bosse Carlgren's poignant, ironic, and humorous lyrics make up small stories in themselves—some even including slightly risqué content. "Och han väntar på mig" describes an adult woman being courted by an eager teenage boy, and the track "Doktorn!" famously includes the line "I've tried candy instead, but I get as fat as a pig." However, the final track "Visa i åttonde månaden" ("Song In The Eighth Month") was written from a very personal perspective, composed during Fältskog's pregnancy with daughter Linda early in 1973.

Fältskog's vocal performances on Elva kvinnor i ett hus are considered technically superior when compared to her earlier solo output, most likely as a result of the vocal coaching she had started when ABBA began to make a name for themselves. Music critics have also noted that the production values on the album are noticeably higher than on previous efforts, some calling it her "masterpiece".

=== Promotion and chart success ===
The first single from the album was "Dom har glömt" ("They Have Forgotten"), written by Agnetha with lyrics by Bosse Carlgren. Agnetha promoted the album with a live performance of "Dom har glömt" and "Tack för en underbar, vanlig dag" in August 1975 on the Swedish Sommarnöjet TV show. Even if ABBA already were a number one act in Sweden at this time, and although the album was a considerable critical and commercial success, it failed to reach the Top 10 on the Swedish album charts, peaking at no 11, even with the inclusion of her Swedish version of "SOS". Elva Kvinnor I Ett Hus however spent a respectable 53 weeks on the charts, and three of the eleven tracks entered the important radio chart Svensktoppen, with "S.O.S." becoming another number one for Fältskog. The Swedish language "SOS" single also reached No. 4 on the singles chart in January 1976.

=== English-language versions ===
As mentioned above "SOS" was originally recorded in English by ABBA. So was "Mina ögon", included on the first Björn & Benny, Agnetha & Frida album Ring Ring in 1973, then called "Disillusion" with lyrics by Björn Ulvaeus, in effect making it the only ABBA recording to be composed by Fältskog. It also makes it one of just two ABBA tracks during their whole career not to be composed by the Andersson/Anderson/Ulvaeus team, the other being a medley of American folk songs, issued as the B-side of 1978 single "Summer Night City".

== Track listing ==
Side one
No.	Title	Lyrics	Music	Title (English translation)	Length
1.	"S.O.S." (Swedish version)	Stig Anderson	Benny Andersson, Björn Ulvaeus		3:23
2.	"En egen trädgård"	Bosse Carlgren	Agnetha Fältskog	A Garden of My Own	2:35
3.	"Tack för en underbar, vanlig dag"	Carlgren	Fältskog	Thanks For a Wonderful, Ordinary Day	2:38
4.	"Gulleplutt" (Swedish version of "Golliwog")	Carlgren	Fältskog	Cutie	2:50
5.	"Är du som han?"	Carlgren	Fältskog	Are You Like Him?	2:50
6.	"Och han väntar på mej"	Carlgren	Fältskog	And He Is Waiting for Me	3:01
Total length:					17:20

Side two
No.	Title	Lyrics	Music	Title (English translation)	Length
1.	"Doktorn!"	Carlgren	Fältskog	Doctor!	2:52
2.	"Mina ögon" (Swedish version of "Disillusion")	Carlgren	Fältskog	My Eyes	3:02
3.	"Dom har glömt"	Carlgren	Fältskog	They Have Forgotten	3:45
4.	"Var det med dej?"	Carlgren	Fältskog	Was It With You?	3:32
5.	"Visa i åttonde månaden"	Carlgren	Fältskog	Song in the Eighth Month	3:54
Total length:					17:07

== Singles ==
Single sleeve for "S.O.S."

"Elva kvinnor i ett hus" includes one of Agnetha's most successful Swedish solo hits, namely her Swedish version of ABBA's "S.O.S.". Upon its release at the end of 1975, it entered the Swedish singles chart and eventually peaked at number 4 in January 1976, becoming only her third single to reach that chart and her first one since 1968.

Release date	A-Side	B-Side	Label number	Swedish charts peak
September 1975	Dom har glömt	Gulleplutt	CUS 301	-
November 1975	S.O.S. (Swedish version)	Visa i åttonde månaden	CUS 303	4

=== Svensktoppen ===
Besides being a top 5 hit on the official Swedish singles chart, Agnetha's version of "S.O.S." also quickly became a huge hit on the important Swedish radio chart Svensktoppen. During its 11-week chart-run, it also topped the hitlist, making it Agnetha's third Svensktoppen number 1. In early 1976 two other tracks from "Elva kvinnor i ett hus" managed to enter Svensktoppen, without being released on single: "Doktorn!" and "Tack för en underbar, vanlig dag" both reached number five and also managed to bring the album back into the charts, which itself reached its highest position in May 1976 (number 11).

Chart entry	Title	Peak position	Time in (weeks)
22 November 1975	S.O.S. (Swedish version)	1	11
13 March 1976	Doktorn!	5	9
17 April 1976	Tack för en underbar, vanlig dag	5	11

== Charts ==
Weekly chart performance for Elva kvinnor i ett hus
Chart (1975)	Peak position
Swedish Albums (Sverigetopplistan)	11

== Certifications ==
Region	Certification	Certified units/sales
Sweden (GLF)	Gold	50,000^{^}
^{^} Shipments figures based on certification alone.

== Personnel ==
- Agnetha Fältskog – vocals, producer
- Michael B. Tretow – engineer
- Sven-Olof Walldoff – orchestra
- Wlodek Gulgowski, Janne Schaffer, Sven-Olof Walldoff – arrangement
- Lars-Johan Roundqvist – idea and production

The following musicians contributed to the recording of Elva kvinnor i ett hus:

- Piano – Benny Andersson, Jan Boquist, Wlodek Gulgowski, Björn J:son Lindh
- drums – Ola Brunkert, Malando Gassama, Roger Palm, Douglas Westlund
- guitars – Björn Linder, Janne Schaffer, Lasse Westman
- bass – Rutger Gunnarsson, Mike Watson
- bass clarinet – Rune Falk
- oboe – Ronnie Bogren
- background vocals – Anders Glenmark, Lasse Holm, Anni-Frid Lyngstad, Claes Palmkvist, Beverly Sundel, Björn Ulvaeus, Lasse Westman, Inger Öst
- strings – Anders Dahl, Gunnar Klinge, Zdrzalka Krzysztof, Gunnar Mickols, Claes Nillson, Bertil Orsin, Per Sandklef, Sixten Strömvall
- viola – Lars Arvinder, Lars Brolin, Niels Heie
- cello – Erik Dybeck, Olle Gustafsson
