= När en vacker tanke blir en sång =

Studio album by Agnetha Fältskog
- Released: November 1971
- Recorded: May–November 1971
- Genre: Pop
- Length: 33:38
- Label: CBS Cupol
- Producer: Björn Ulvaeus

Agnetha Fältskog chronology
Som jag är (1970)	När en vacker tanke blir en sång (1971)	Agnetha Fältskogs bästa (1973)

Singles from När en vacker tanke blir en sång
- 1. "Kungens vaktparad" Released: August 1971; 2. "Många gånger än" Released: September 1971; 3. "Dröm är dröm, och saga saga" Released: December 1971

Alternative cover
- 1974 Reissue

När en vacker tanke blir en sång ("When a Beautiful Thought Becomes a Song") is the fourth Swedish solo album by Swedish pop singer and ABBA member Agnetha Fältskog, which was released in the end of 1971.

== Album information ==
After producing a large part of her previous album Som jag är, Agnetha's fiancé Björn Ulvaeus this time produced the entire album. They got married on 6 July 1971. The recording of the album took place on various occasions during 1971, beginning in May, continuing through July and October and ending on 4 November. As with her previous albums, the recording was assisted by Michael B. Tretow and features Sven-Olof Walldoff and his choir and orchestra.

Contrary to its predecessor Som jag är, which mainly included cover versions and only two new Agnetha compositions, Agnetha's fourth studio album consists almost entirely of her own work. The last track, "Dröm är dröm, och saga saga", was the only exception, being a cover version of Anna Identici's hit Era bello il mio ragazzo. Considering the fact that she also wrote some of the lyrics herself or together with producer Björn Ulvaeus, "När en vacker tanke blir en sång" (the title coming from the first line of the lyrics of "Då finns du hos mig") can be seen as the most personal and self-written album of her career (its successor Elva kvinnor i ett hus includes ten Agnetha compositions, yet no lyrics by her).

The above-mentioned "Dröm är dröm, och saga saga" marks also one of the first occasions that all four of the future ABBA members can be heard on the same recording. Additionally, both Benny Andersson and Anni-Frid Lyngstad also contributed to some other tracks on the album:

- Benny Andersson plays piano on: "Många gånger än", "Nya ord","Jag skall inte fälla några tårar" and "Då finns du hos mig"
- Benny Andersson and Anni-Frid Lyngstad sing background on: "Kanske var min kind lite het", "Sången föder dig tillbaka", "Tågen kan gå igen" and "Dröm är dröm, och saga saga"

Three years after its original release, the album was re-released in 1974 by Swedish label Embassy (EMB 31094) with a new cover and the simple title "Agnetha". Finally, "När en vacker tanke blir en sång" was released on CD for the first time in 2004 as part of the box-set De första åren.

== Track listing ==
Side A
No.	Title	Lyrics	Music	Title (English translation)	Length
1.	"Många gånger än"	Peter Himmelstrand	Agnetha Fältskog	Many Times Yet	2:37
2.	"Jag vill att du skall bli lycklig"	Agnetha Fältskog	Agnetha Fältskog	I Want You To Be Happy	3:07
3.	"Kungens vaktparad"	Agnetha Fältskog, Björn Ulvaeus	Agnetha Fältskog	The King's Changing of the Guards	2:47
4.	"Mitt sommarland"	Agnetha Fältskog, Björn Ulvaeus	Agnetha Fältskog	My Summer Land	2:24
5.	"Nya ord"	Bosse Carlgren	Agnetha Fältskog	New Words	2:15
6.	"Jag ska inte fälla några tårar"	Agnetha Fältskog	Agnetha Fältskog	I Won't Shed Any Tears	2:00
Total length:					15:12

Side B
No.	Title	Lyrics	Music	Title (English translation)	Length
1.	"Då finns du hos mig"	Bosse Carlgren	Agnetha Fältskog	You Are With Me Then	2:31
2.	"Han lämnar mig för att komma till dig"	Agnetha Fältskog, Björn Ulvaeus	Agnetha Fältskog	He Is Leaving Me to Come to You	3:04
3.	"Kanske var min kind lite het"	Agnetha Fältskog	Agnetha Fältskog	Maybe My Cheek Was a Little Hot	3:09
4.	"Sången föder dig tillbaka"	Björn Carlsson	Agnetha Fältskog	The Song Brings You Back	3:12
5.	"Tågen kan gå igen"	Bosse Carlgren	Agnetha Fältskog	The Trains Can Run Again	3:03
6.	"Dröm är dröm, och saga saga" (swed. version of "Era bello il mio ragazzo")	Stig Anderson	Gianluigi Guarnieri, Pier Paolo Preti	A Dream Is a Dream and A Fairy Tale Is a Fairy Tale	3:24
Total length:					18:26

== Singles ==
Altogether three singles (one of which being just a promo-single for radio) were released off Agnetha's fourth studio album. None of them charted on the official Swedish sales chart Kvällstoppen.

Release date	A-Side	B-Side	Label number	Swedish charts peak
August 1971	Kungens vaktparad	Jag vill att du skall bli lycklig	CS 277	–
September 1971	Många gånger än	Han lämnar mig för att komma till dig	CS 278	–
December 1971	Dröm är dröm, och saga saga	Nya ord	CS 280 (radio promo only)	–

=== Svensktoppen ===
Three tracks from "När en vacker tanke blir en sång" appeared on the important Swedish radio chart Svensktoppen. The album's only cover version, "Dröm är dröm, och saga saga", which was a radio-only single in the end of 1971, was the most successful and eventually reached the top 3 in the end of December, while Agnetha's own composition "Många gånger än" reached the top 5 some months earlier. The beginning of 1972 marked the rare occasion of a none-single track showing up on Svensktoppen, namely "Sången föder dig tillbaka", which cracked the top 10 for one week in February.

Chart entry	Title	Peak position	Time in (weeks)
3 October 1971	Många gånger än	5	7
26 December 1971	Dröm är dröm, och saga saga	3	8
20 February 1972	Sången föder dig tillbaka	10	1
