= Som jag är =

Som Jag Är

Studio album by Agnetha Fältskog
- Released: October 1970
- Recorded: January – October 1970
- Studio: Metronome Studio (present-day Atlantis Studio (sv), Stockholm
- Genre: Pop
- Length: 36:37
- Label: Cupol
- Producer: Björn Ulvaeus; Karl Gerhard Lundkvist

Agnetha Fältskog chronology
Agnetha Fältskog Vol. 2 (1969)	Som Jag Är (1970)	När en vacker tanke blir en sång (1971)

Singles from Som jag är
- 1. "Om tårar vore guld" Released: March 1970; 2. "Ta det bara med ro" Released: 1970; 3. "En sång och en saga" Released: 1971

Som jag är (English: As I Am) is the third solo album by Swedish pop singer and ABBA member Agnetha Fältskog, released in late 1970.

== Album information ==
The album was co-produced by Little Gerhard (Karl-Gerhard Lundqvist) and Agnetha's boyfriend at the time, Björn Ulvaeus. Recording took place in January 1970 ("Om tårar vore guld") as well as September and October of the same year. All songs were recorded in Metronome Studios, Stockholm. Like on her second album, two of the songs were composed by Agnetha herself ("Om tårar vore guld" and "Jag skall göra allt"), while she wrote the Swedish lyrics to a couple of cover versions. "Jag skall göra allt" was recorded in German as "Tausend Wunder" (Thousand Wonders).

The best known track is "Om tårar vore guld", a Svensktoppen top 3 hit, which was also released as the first single from the album. The song can be regarded as one of her most successful numbers in Sweden before the ABBA period and it was also a highlight in the set of her folk park tour in the summer of 1970. This was in spite of a claim from a Danish composer that she had used 22 bars from his composition "Tema", even though this had been written in the 1950s and had never been recorded. The case dragged on until 1977, when a settlement was reached and Fältskog paid the Dane SEK 5,000.

The album has since been re-issued both on CD, iTunes and vinyl.

== Track listing ==
Side A
No.	Title	Lyrics	Music	Title (English translation)	Length
1.	"Som ett eko" (Swedish version of "Vagabondo")	Stig Anderson	Alberto Morina, Giulio D'Ercole, Adriano Tomassini, Mario Vicari	Like An Echo	3:16
2.	"När jag var fem" (Swedish version of "When I Was Five")	Peter Himmelstrand	Alan Bernstein, Victor Millrose	When I Was Five	3:14
3.	"En sång och en saga" (Swedish version of "La première étoile")	Stig Anderson	Paul Mauriat, André Pascal	A Song and A Story	3:40
4.	"Tänk va' skönt" (Swedish version of "Good To Be Alive")	Agnetha Fältskog	Val Avon	Imagine How Nice	3:24
5.	"Ta det bara med ro" (Swedish version of "Things Go Better With Love")	Stig Anderson	Naomi Martin	Take It Easy	2:14
6.	"Om tårar vore guld"	Agnetha Fältskog	Agnetha Fältskog	If Tears Were Made of Gold	3:30
Total length:					19:21

Side B
No.	Title	Lyrics	Music	Title (English translation)	Length
1.	"Hjärtats saga" (Arranged by Agnetha Fältskog, Björn Ulvaeus and Sven-Olof Walldoff)	Wilhelm Åström	Wilhelm Åström	The Story of the Heart	2:21
2.	"Spela vår sång" (Swedish version of "Melody Man")	Agnetha Fältskog	Tony Cole	Play Our Song	2:23
3.	"Så här börjar kärlek" (med Björn Ulvaeus)	Peter Himmelstrand	Peter Himmelstrand	This Is How Love Begins	2:35 swed.
4.	"Du ska minnas mig" (Swedish version of "You'll Remember Me")	Agnetha Fältskog	Arthur Hamilton, Stan Worth	You Will Remember Me	3:14
5.	"Jag ska göra allt"	Agnetha Fältskog	Agnetha Fältskog	I Will Do Anything	3:50
6.	"Sov gott min lilla vän" (Swedish version of "Un jour, un enfant")	Agnetha Fältskog	Emil Stern, Eddy Marnay	Sleep Well My Little Friend	2:50
Total length:					17:16

== Singles ==
Single sleeve for "Om tårar vore guld"

Single sleeve for "Ta det bara med ro"

Altogether three singles (one of which being just a promo-single for radio) were released off Agnetha's third album. None of them charted on the official Swedish sales chart Kvällstoppen. The first single, "Om tårar vore guld", features a cover version of "Little Altar Boy" on its b-side, titled "Litet Solskensbarn" (Little Child Of The Sun). The song was recorded together with "Om tårar vore guld" in early 1970, but subsequently left off the album.

Release date	A-Side	B-Side	Label number	Swedish charts peak
March 1970	Om tårar vore guld	Litet solskensbarn	CS 264	-
1970	Ta det bara med ro	Som ett eko	CS 272	-
1971	En sång och en saga	Jag ska göra allt	CS 275 (radio promo only)	-

=== Svensktoppen ===
Two tracks from "Som jag är" appeared on the important Swedish radio chart Svensktoppen, "Om tårar vore guld" being the most successful, reaching the top 3 and eventually staying on the chart for 15 weeks in the spring of 1970.

Chart entry	Title	Peak position	Time in (weeks)
12 April 1970	Om tårar vore guld	3	15
28 March 1971	En sång och en saga	4	5

== Charts ==
Weekly chart for Som jag är
Chart (2017)	Peak position
Swedish Albums (Sverigetopplistan)	54
