= Little Gerhard =

Swedish musical artist (1934–2026)

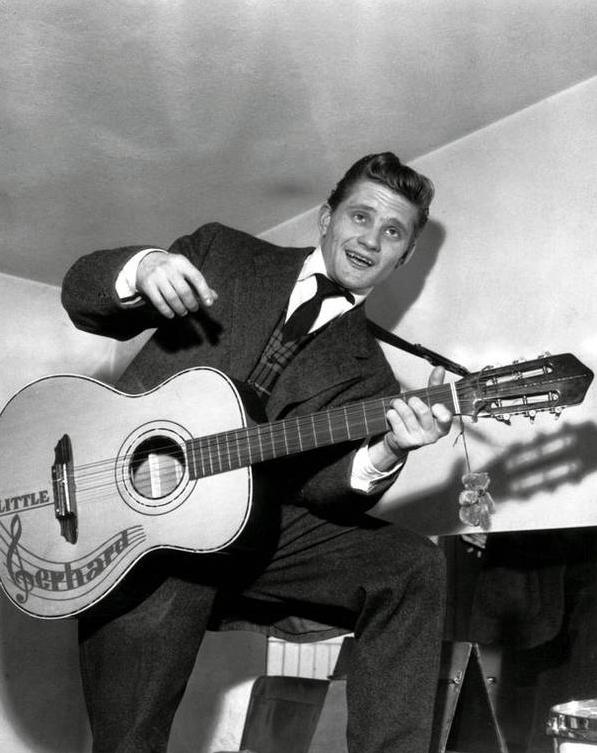
- Little Gerhard in Helsingborg, 1959

Background information
- Also known as: Little Gerhard
- Born: Karl-Gerhard Lundkvist; 17 May 1934; Västerås, Sweden
- Died: 14 July 2026 (aged 92)
- Occupation: Singer
- Spouse: Theptong Lundkvist (m. 2012)

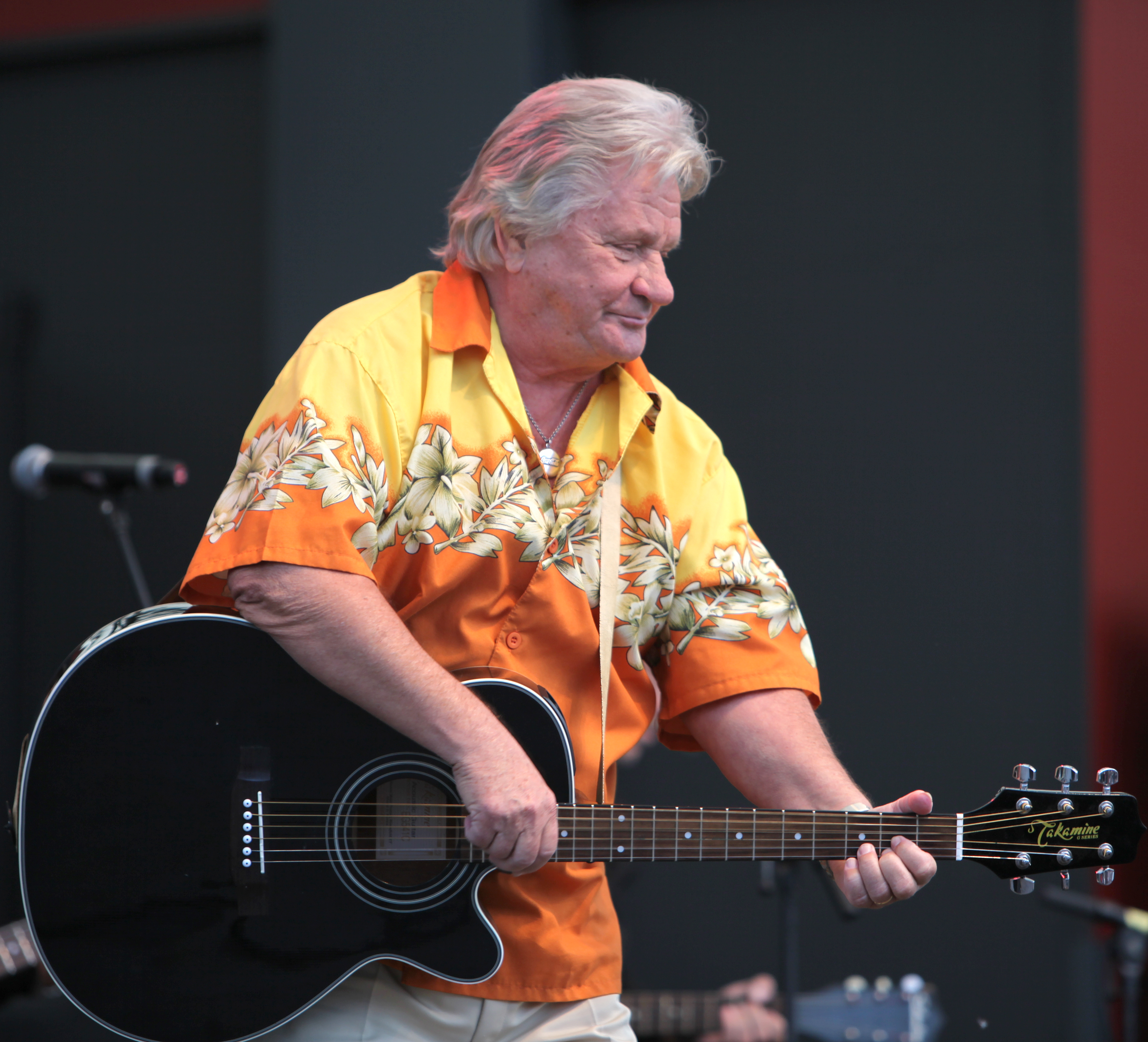
Little Gerhard in Kungsträdgården 2009

Karl-Gerhard Lundkvist (17 May 1934 – 14 July 2026), known under his stage name Little Gerhard, was a Swedish singer and rock musician. He had music hits between 1958 and the mid-1960s with "Buona Sera", "What You've Done to Me", and "Den siste mohikanen".

== Early life and career ==
Karl-Gerhard Lundkvist was born on 17 May 1934 in Tillberga, Sweden. In his early years he boarded a ship and became a sailor. He made his stage debut in 1952 in Amsterdam, Netherlands, at the nightclub "Trocadero". At that time he played guitar and the accordion.

After ending his career as a sailor he moved to Stockholm, where he entered several amateur singing competitions, and he later saw success as a rock musician. His first music group was called Halen, which he performed with at New Year's Eve 1957. Via this concert he signed with the record label Karusell. He released his first music album in 1958, called Little Gerhard; the song "What You've Done to Me" became his first hit. Already in March of the same year he was named "Sweden's rock music king", and in August that year he also was named "the rock music king of the Nordics". He made his film debut in the 1958 film Det svänger på slottet.

His third music album became, at its release in 1958, the best-selling music album within Swedish rock 'n' roll during the 1950s, and Little Gerhard's Gold certified record. He and his band, the G-men, toured for five years each summer starting in 1959.

While touring in West Germany in 1959, he got to meet Elvis Presley, who was stationed for military duty in the country at that time. Little Gerhard's manager had sent his recordings to Presley, who agreed to meet him, and praised his music single "No Wedding Today". Elvis and Little Gerhard also planned to attend a concert in Frankfurt together, but Presley's commanding officer in the army denied him leave to attend.

In 1961, he started to sing in Swedish, his native tongue, now under the artist name Little Gerhard for the first time. His song "Blommor och bin" charted on the Svensktoppen list. He also did recordings in West Germany and sang in German.

By the late 1960s, he focused on his career as a songwriter and producer. He composed and produced the song "Ska vi plocka körsbär i min trädgård?", performed by Ann-Christine Bärnsten in Melodifestivalen 1975. He participated in Melodifestivalen 1982 broadcast on SVT with the song "Hand i hand med dig" in a duet with singer Yvonne Olsson.

Later in the 1960s, Little Gerhard worked as a producer for the record label Cupol, and it was he who discovered Agnetha Fältskog, later one of the members in ABBA. She was the vocalist in a local band that sent him a demo tape — featuring songs self-penned by her — in the hope of recording an album. However, he was impressed only by the vocalist and her song "Jag var så kär," and he arranged for it to be recorded and released in 1967. The record, which marked Fältskog's major breakthrough, reached number one on the best selling chart "Kvällstoppen" in early 1968. Little Gerhard also wrote Fältskog's hit "Allting har förändrat sig" which in 1968 peaked at number two on "Svensktoppen" and number seven on "Kvällstoppen" in autumn 1968.

== Personal life and death ==
Gerhard married his wife Theptong Lundkvist in 2012. He died on 14 July 2026, at the age of 92.

== Filmography ==
- 1958 – Det svänger på slottet
- 1958 – Åsa-Nisse in Military Uniform
