= Agnetha Fältskog Vol. 2 =

Studio album by Agnetha Fältskog
- Released: November 1969
- Recorded: 1969
- Studios: Metronome Studios, Stockholm
- Genre: Schlager
- Length: 30:13
- Label: Cupol
- Producer: Karl Gerhard Lundkvist

Agnetha Fältskog chronology
| Agnetha Fältskog (1968) | Agnetha Fältskog Vol. 2 (1969) | Som jag är (1970) |

Singles from Agnetha Fältskog Vol. 2
- 1. "En gång fanns bara vi två" Released: April 1969; 2. "Hjärtats kronprins" Released: 1969; 3. "Zigenarvän" Released: November 1969

Agnetha Fältskog Vol. 2 is the second solo album by the Swedish pop singer and ABBA member Agnetha Fältskog. It was recorded and released in 1969 through Cupol Records.

== Album information ==
"Zigenarvän" was the biggest hit, but its overly romantic lyrics about a young girl attending a Gypsy wedding and falling in love with the bride's brother became the source of controversy. Its release coincided with a heated debate about Gypsies in the Swedish media, and Fältskog was accused of deliberately trying to make money out of the situation by writing the song.

Other tracks entering the Svensktoppen chart were "Fram för Svenska Sommaren" and "En Gång Fanns Bara Vi Två".

A large part of the songs on this album were written by Agnetha's fiancé at the time, West German record producer Dieter Zimmermann who tried to launch her career in German-speaking countries like West Germany, Switzerland and Austria. Fältskog released a total of eight singles in the German language between the years 1969 and 1972, but her success was fairly limited. Tracks originally recorded in German on this album include "Señor Gonzales", "Som en vind kom du till mej" (Wie der Wind) and "Det handlar om kärlek" (Concerto d'Amore).

The album has been re-issued both on CD and iTunes. The Dutch label Royal Records re-released the album on CD for the very first time in 2000. Next to the 12 original tracks the release also featured three bonus tracks taken from the Swedish TV series Räkna de lyckliga stunderna blott.

== Track listing ==
Side one
| No. | Title | Lyrics | Music | Title (English translation) | Length |
|---|---|---|---|---|---|
| 1. | "Fram för svenska sommaren" | Karl Gerhard Lundkvist | Jack E Lit, Lou Herscher, Ruth Grahm | "Let's hear it for Swedish Summer" | 2:26 |
| 2. | "Lek med dina dockor" | Agnetha Fältskog | Dieter Zimmermann | "Play with Your Dolls" | 2:15 |
| 3. | "Ge dej till tåls" (Swedish version of "Are You Ready for Love") | Bo Göran Edling | Alan Hawkshaw, Ray Cameron | "Be Patient" | 2:25 |
| 4. | "Skål kära vän" | Fältskog | Dieter Zimmermann | "Cheers, My Dear Friend" | 2:05 |
| 5. | "Glöm honom" | Fältskog | Dieter Zimmermann | "Forget Him" | 2:15 |
| 6. | "En gång fanns bara vi två" | Karl Gerhard Lundkvist | Karl Gerhard Lundkvist | "Once There Was Just Us Two" | 2:41 |
| Total length: | | | | | 13:58 |

Side two
| No. | Title | Lyrics | Music | Title (English translation) | Length |
|---|---|---|---|---|---|
| 1. | "Hjärtats kronprins" | Stig Anderson | Heinz Meyer, Fred Weyrich | "The Crown Prince of Hearts" | 2:34 |
| 2. | "Det handlar om kärlek" | Bengt Haslum | Hans Blum | "It's About Love" | 2:26 |
| 3. | "Som en vind kom du till mig" | Fältskog | Dieter Zimmermann | "You Came to Me Like a Wind" | 3:24 |
| 4. | "Señor Gonzales" | Bengt Olov Sundström | Dieter Zimmermann | "Señor Gonzales" | 2:28 |
| 5. | "Zigenarvän" (chorus similar to "Tanto Pe' Cantà" by Ettore Petrolini) | Bengt Haslum | Fältskog | "Gypsy Friend" | 2:56 |
| 6. | "Tag min hand låt oss bli vänner" | Fältskog | Fältskog | "Take My Hand and Let's Be Friends" | 2:14 |
| Total length: | | | | | 16:14 |

Bonus tracks (Royal Records release (2000))
| No. | Title | Lyrics | Music | Title (English translation) | Length |
|---|---|---|---|---|---|
| 13. | "Nu ska vi opp, opp, opp" | Gösta Stevens | Jules Sylvain | "Now We Go Up, Up, Up" | 1:59 |
| 14. | "Medley" (Värkänslor (Ja, de' ä' våren), Det kommer en vår, Nu ska vi vara snälla) | Sten Hage, Jokern, Karl Gerhard | Jules Sylvain | | 1:44 |
| 15. | "En stilla flirt" | Gösta Stevens | Jules Sylvain | "A Silent Flirt" | 2:26 |

== Singles ==
Single sleeve for "Zigenarvän"

During the year of 1969, three singles were released off of Fältskog's second studio album. None of them charted on the official Swedish sales chart Kvällstoppen.

| Release date | A-side | B-side | Label number | Swedish charts peak |
|---|---|---|---|---|
| April 1969 | En gång fanns bara vi två | Fram för svenska sommaren | CS 250 | - |
| 1969 | Hjärtats kronprins | Tag min hand låt oss bli vänner | CS 256 | - |
| November 1969 | Zigenarvän | Som en vind kom du till mig | CS 260 | - |

=== Svensktoppen ===
Two tracks from Agnetha Fältskog Vol. 2 appeared on the Swedish radio chart Svensktoppen.

| Chart entry | Title | Peak position | Time in (weeks) |
|---|---|---|---|
| 11 May 1969 | Fram för svenska sommaren | 4 | 4 |
| 23 November 1969 | Zigenarvän | 5 | 6 |
