= Agnetha Fältskog =

Swedish singer (born 1950)

Agnetha Fältskog KVO1kl
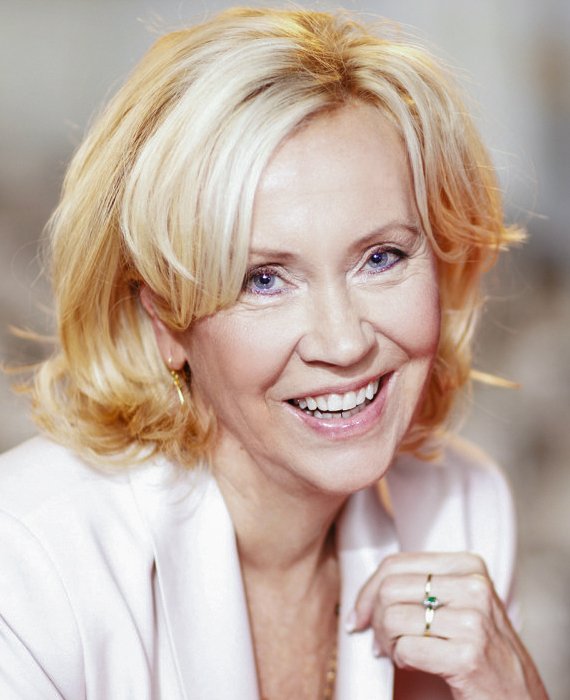
- Fältskog in 2013
- Born: Åse Agneta Fältskog; 5 April 1950 (age 76); Jönköping, Sweden
- Other name: Anna
- Occupations: Singer; songwriter
- Years active: 1967–1988; 2004–present
- Spouses: Björn Ulvaeus (m. 1971; div. 1980) Tomas Sonnenfeld (m. 1990; div. 1993)
- Children: 2, including Linda
- Musical career
- Genres: Pop; schlager; easy listening; children's music
- Instruments: Vocals; piano
- Labels: Cupol; Columbia; Polar; WEA; Universal; BMG
- Formerly of: ABBA
- Agnetha Fältskog's voice from the BBC programme Front Row, 3 May 2013

Åse Agneta "Agnetha" Fältskog (Note: Even though she uses the form Agnetha, Fältskog's legal first name is spelled without the "h". She has also been known as Anna Fältskog.) (Swedish pronunciation: [aŋˈnêːta ˈfɛ̂ltskuːɡ]; born 5 April 1950) is a Swedish singer and songwriter, best known as a member of the pop group ABBA. She first achieved success in Sweden with the release of her 1968 self-titled debut album. She rose to international stardom in the 1970s as a member of ABBA, which is one of the best-selling music acts in history.

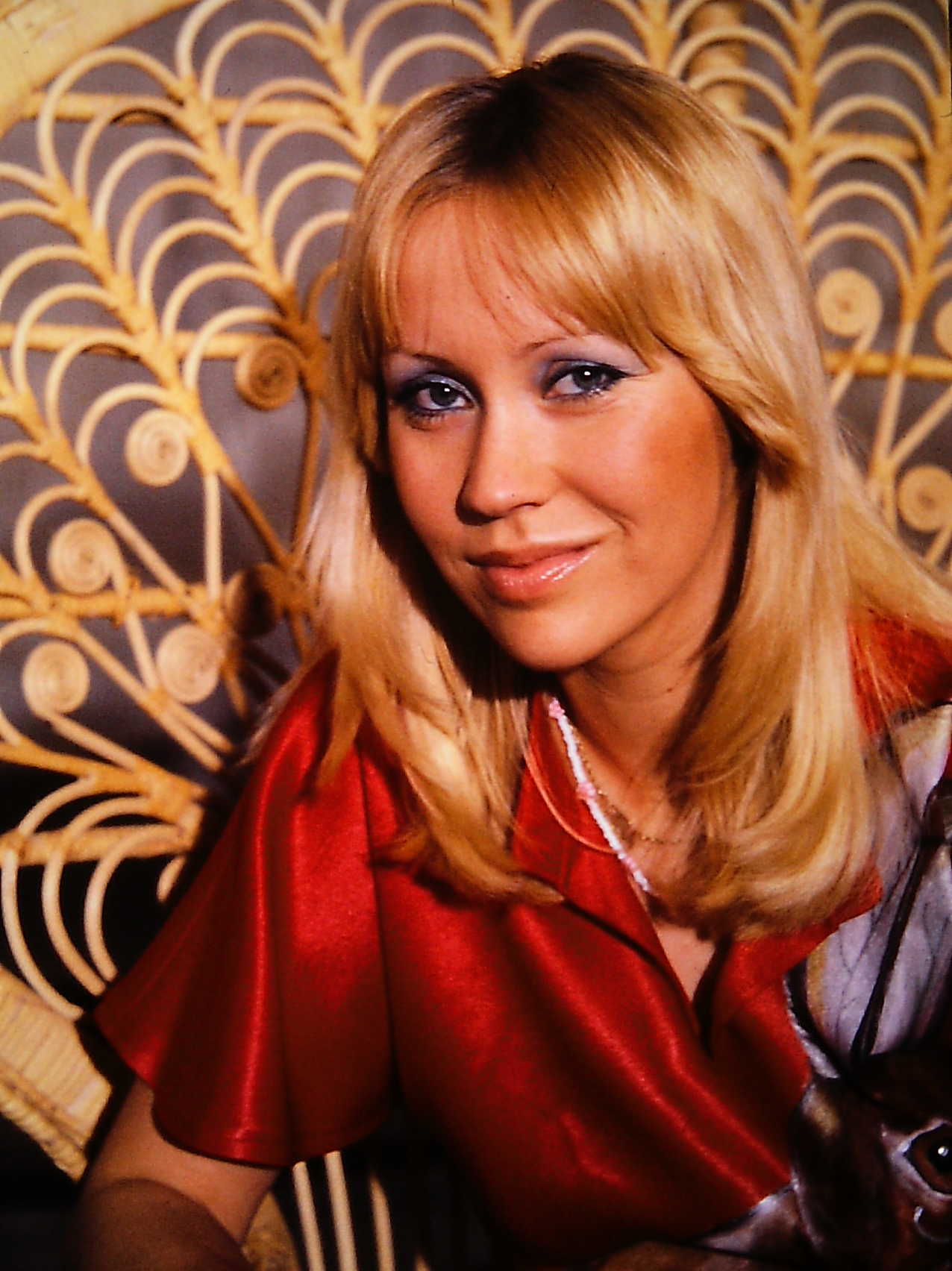
Fältskog in 1978

After the unofficial break-up of ABBA in December 1982, she had success later in the decade as a solo artist with three albums and a leading role in a movie. She became reclusive in the 1990s, avoiding outside publicity and residing on the Stockholm County island of Ekerö.

Fältskog stopped recording music for 16 years until she released the album My Colouring Book in 2004, followed in 2013 by A, her highest UK charting solo album to date. She reunited with ABBA from 2016 until 2022 and they released their ninth studio album, Voyage.

== Life and career ==
=== Early life ===
Åse Agneta Fältskog was born in Jönköping on 5 April 1950. She was the first of two daughters of department store manager Knut Ingvar Fältskog (1922–1995) and his wife Birgit Margareta Johansson (1923–1994). Ingvar showed much interest in music and show business, and Birgit devoted herself to her children and household. Fältskog's younger sister, Mona, was born in 1955.

Fältskog wrote her first song at the age of six, titled "Två små troll" ("Two Small Trolls"). In 1958, she began taking piano lessons, and also sang in a local church choir. In early 1960, Fältskog formed a musical trio, the Cambers, with her friends Lena Johansson and Elisabeth Strub. They performed locally in minor venues but soon dissolved due to lack of work. Fältskog's first professional engagement came after she was taken on by a local dance band at the age of 15, following which she left school and worked as a telephonist whilst also performing with the band.

Fältskog cites Connie Francis, Marianne Faithfull, Aretha Franklin, Lesley Gore and Petula Clark as her strongest musical influences.

=== Career development in Sweden (1966–1971) ===
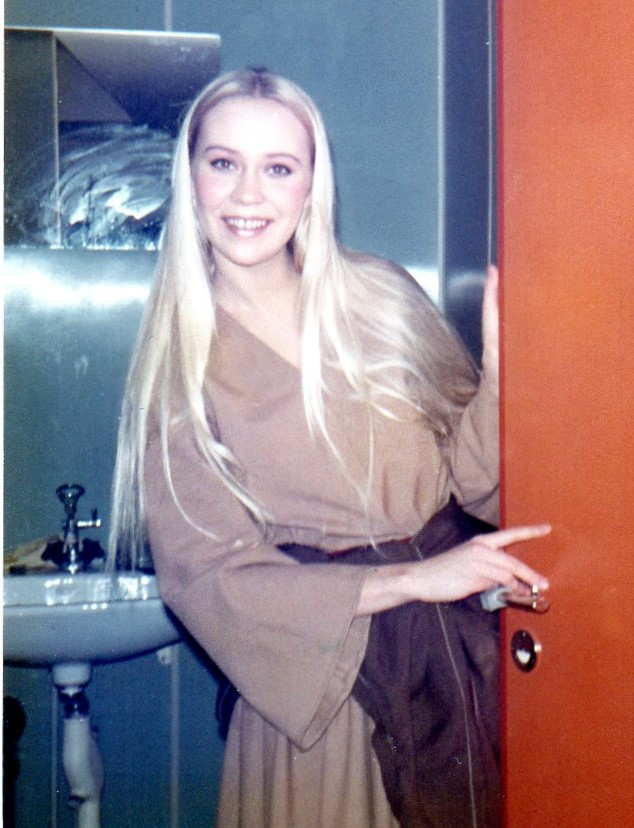
Fältskog in 1972

For two years Fältskog continued singing with the Bernt Enghardt band, and as its popularity grew, decided to give up her other job when combining both careers proved physically too demanding. During that time, Fältskog broke up with her boyfriend Björn Lilja; this event inspired her to write a song, "Jag var så kär" ("I Was So in Love"), that soon brought her to media prominence.

At that time, Karl Gerhard Lundkvist, a relative of one of the band's members, retired from his successful rock and roll career and began working as a record producer at Cupol Records. Enghardt sent him a demo recording of the band, but Lundkvist only showed interest in Fältskog and her song. She was worried because he was not interested in the band, and they were not to be included on the record. However, she decided to accept the offer and signed a recording contract with Cupol Records.

Her self-penned debut single "Jag var så kär" was recorded on 16 October 1967 and released through Cupol Records the following month. It topped the Swedish Chart on 28 January 1968 and sold more than 80,000 copies. The second single, her self-penned "Utan dig" ('Without you'), was also a big hit and so was her third single from 1968 "Allting har förändrat sig" ('Everything has changed'). She also submitted the song "Försonade" ('Reconciled') to Melodifestivalen, the Swedish preliminary for the Eurovision Song Contest, but it was not selected for the final. Fältskog developed a career as one of Sweden's most popular pop music artists, participating in a television special about Swedish composer Jules Sylvain in 1969. The same year, she released the single "Zigenarvän" ('Romani Friend') about a young girl attending a Romani wedding and falling in love with the bride's brother. Its release coincided with a heated debate about Romani in the Swedish media, and Fältskog was accused of deliberately trying to make money out of the situation by writing the song.

Fältskog's success continued throughout the late 1960s. She met German songwriter/producer Dieter Zimmermann, to whom she became engaged. Her albums thus reached the German charts, and Zimmermann promised she would achieve great success in Germany. However, when she went there and met with record producers, the venture was not productive; Fältskog refused to meet the demands of the producers, describing their chosen material as "horrible". She soon ended her engagement to Zimmermann and returned to Sweden.

In 1970, she released "Om tårar vore guld" ("If Tears Were Gold"). The Danish composer Per Hviid claimed that she used 22 bars from his composition "Tema" ("Theme"), although it was written in the 1950s and had never been recorded. The case dragged on until 1977 when a settlement was reached and Fältskog paid the Danish musician SEK 5,000,000.

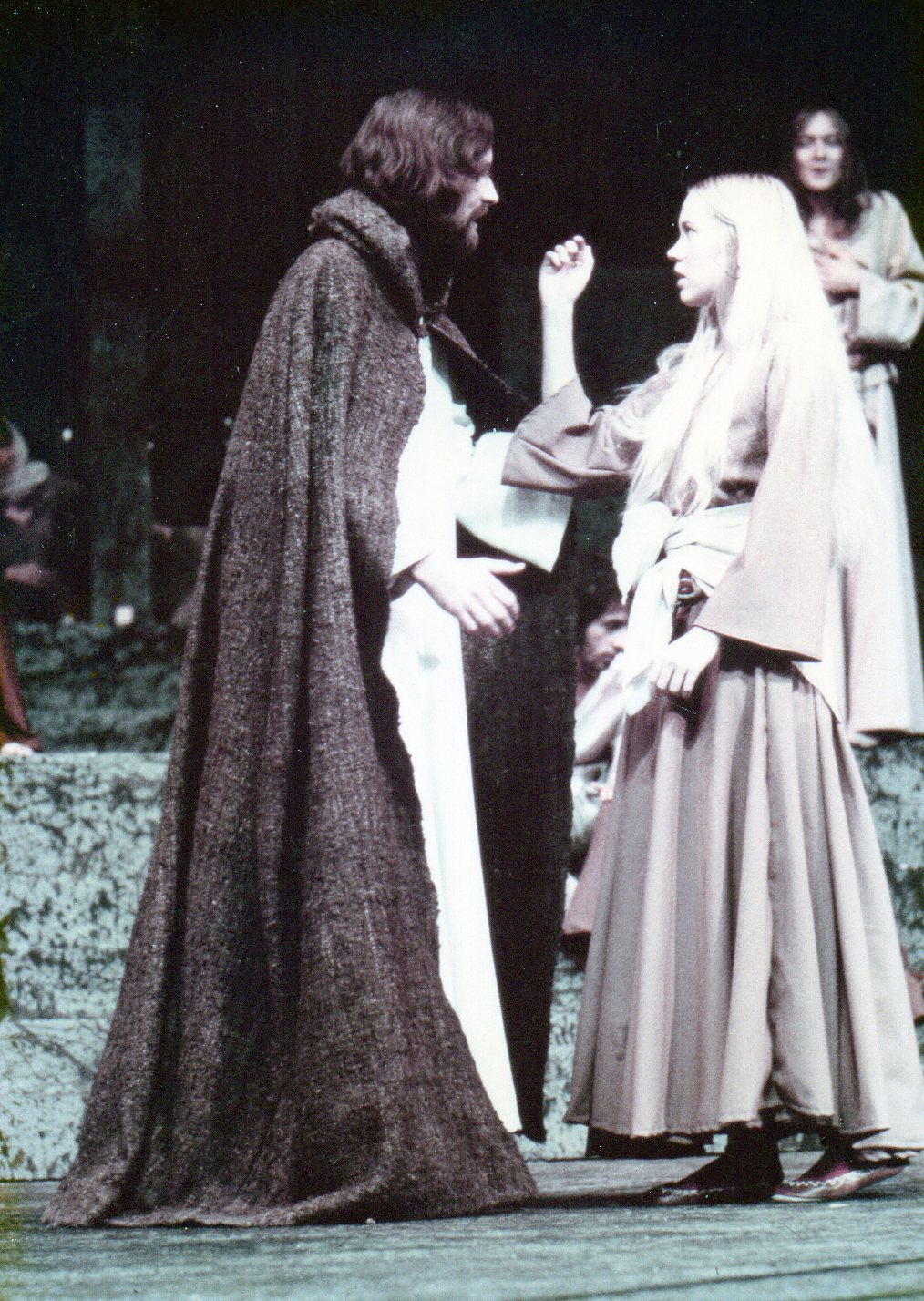
Fältskog with Peter Winsnes in Jesus Christ Superstar in 1972

In 1972, Fältskog portrayed Mary Magdalene in the Swedish production of the international hit musical Jesus Christ Superstar.

=== First marriage and years with ABBA (1971–1982) ===
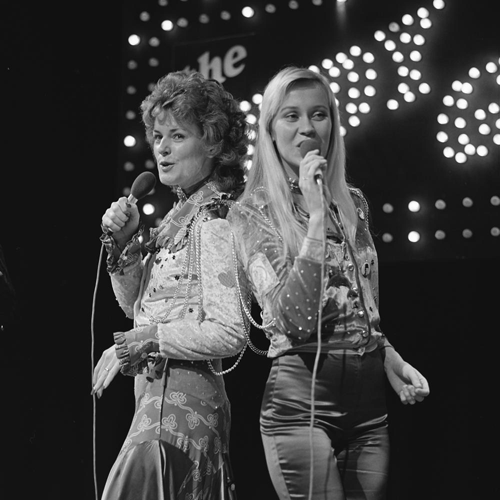
Fältskog and Anni-Frid Lyngstad at The Eddy Go Round Show, 1974

Fältskog met Björn Ulvaeus, a member of the Hootenanny Singers, for the first time in 1968 and then again in 1969. Her relationship with Ulvaeus, as well as her friendship with Anni-Frid Lyngstad and Benny Andersson, with whom Ulvaeus had already written songs, eventually led to the formation of ABBA. Fältskog and Ulvaeus married on 6 July 1971 in the village of Verum, with Andersson playing the organ at their wedding. Their first child, Linda Elin Ulvaeus, was born on 23 February 1973, and their son Peter Christian Ulvaeus on 4 December 1977. After seven years of marriage, the couple decided to separate in late 1978 and filed for divorce in January 1979. The divorce was finalised in July 1980. Both Fältskog and Ulvaeus agreed not to let their failed marriage interfere with their responsibilities with ABBA. The failure of their marriage inspired Ulvaeus to write the lyrics of "The Winner Takes It All".

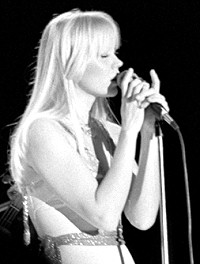
Fältskog at the opening concert of ABBA's European and Australian Tour in Oslo, 28 January 1977

In 1975, during the same period as her bandmate Anni-Frid Lyngstad recorded her Swedish number one album Frida ensam, Fältskog recorded and produced her solo album Elva kvinnor i ett hus. These albums were both recorded between sessions and promotion for the ABBA albums Waterloo and ABBA.

The album spent 53 weeks on the Swedish album chart (longer than any of ABBA's albums), but failed to reach the Top 10, peaking at number 11. It contained three further Svensktoppen entries for Fältskog: her Swedish-language version of ABBA's "SOS" (also number four on the single sales chart); "Tack För En Underbar Vanlig Dag"; and "Doktorn!" Except for "SOS", all the songs had lyrics by Bosse Carlgren and music by Fältskog herself. The creation of the album had been underway since 1972 when Fältskog started writing the songs, but it was delayed because of the work with ABBA and her pregnancy. In 1974, Fältskog and Carlgren agreed on a concept for the album; it should consist of 12 songs, each sung by 12 female characters living in the same apartment building. However, in the end, only 11 songs were featured on the album, and the concept was not fully developed.

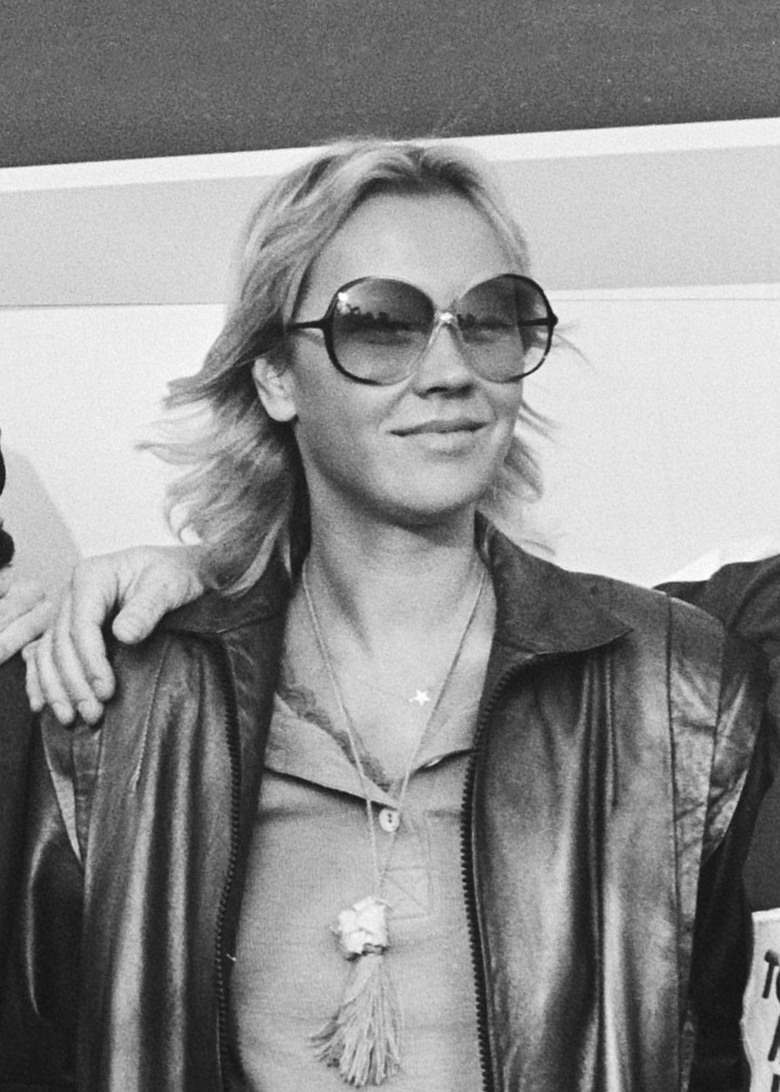
Fältskog in 1979

Between 1968 and 1980, Fältskog had a total of 18 entries on the Svensktoppen radio chart, starting with the debut single "Jag var så kär" in January 1968, which peaked at the top position, and ending with "När du tar mig i din famn" ("When You Take Me in Your Arms") from the compilation Tio år med Agnetha in January 1980, which it last charted at that top position. These 18 entries, most of which were composed or co-written by Fältskog herself, spent a total of 139 weeks on the chart during this time, with the biggest hit being 1970's "Om tårar vore guld" (number one for 15 weeks).

Fältskog also recorded the Swedish Christmas album Nu tändas tusen juleljus with daughter Linda Ulvaeus which peaked at number six on the Swedish album chart in December 1981.

In 1981, Fältskog wrote the ballad "Men natten är vår" ("But the Night Is Ours") with lyrics by Ingela Forsman for the Melodifestivalen, but instead of performing the song in the contest herself, she chose new talent Kicki Moberg. The song placed 9th out of 10. The single, which Fältskog produced in the Polar Studios with the same musicians as on contemporary ABBA recordings, was backed with the Swedish version of "I'm Still Alive", entitled "Här är mitt liv" ("Here Is My Life"), a song which she herself had performed in its English version (lyrics by ex-husband Björn Ulvaeus) during ABBA's 1979 world tour.

Moberg's recording of the song remains the only version to have been officially released to date.

Fältskog possesses a soprano voice and her range expands from D3 to E♭6. She sang solo parts in the following ABBA songs: "Disillusion" (the only ABBA song to have been written by her, lyrics by Björn), "I Am Just a Girl", "Hasta Mañana", "Dance (While the Music Still Goes On)", "SOS", "I've Been Waiting for You", "When I Kissed the Teacher", "My Love, My Life", "Take a Chance on Me", "The Name of the Game", "Move On", "Thank You for the Music", "Get on the Carousel", "Chiquitita", "Lovelight", "As Good as New", "If It Wasn't for the Nights", "Kisses of Fire", "Dream World", "Gimme! Gimme! Gimme! (A Man After Midnight)", "The Way Old Friends Do", "The Winner Takes It All", "Happy New Year", "Lay All Your Love on Me", "Head Over Heels", "One of Us", "Soldiers", "Slipping Through My Fingers", "Just Like That" (never officially released in its entirety by the group), "I Am the City", "Under Attack", "The Day Before You Came", "Don't Shut Me Down", "I Can Be That Woman" and "Keep an Eye on Dan".

As a member of ABBA, Fältskog was also known as Anna in some countries.

=== Solo career development (1982–1988) ===
Although no official announcement was made, ABBA effectively disbanded in late 1982 to early 1983. At the end of 1982, Fältskog duetted with Swedish singer (and former ABBA backing vocalist) Tomas Ledin on a song called "Never Again", which became a Top Five hit in Sweden, and Top 10 in Norway, Belgium, and Finland. The song was also released in a Spanish-language version, entitled "Ya Nunca Más". In the summer of the same year, Fältskog had a leading role in the Swedish movie Raskenstam.

In May 1983, Fältskog released her first post-ABBA solo album, Wrap Your Arms Around Me, produced by Mike Chapman. The album became a moderate hit in North America and Australia but reached the higher regions of the charts across Europe, including the top spots in Sweden, Norway, Finland, Belgium, and Denmark (where it became the biggest-selling album of the year), top five in Germany, The Netherlands and number 18 in the UK. The album achieved sales of 1.5 million copies in the first year. Two singles from the album became hits in continental Europe: "The Heat Is On" became a number one hit in Sweden, Denmark, Norway, Finland, and Belgium and number two in The Netherlands and Germany. The song peaked at number 35 in the UK (and was Fältskog's highest charting and only UK Top 40 hit until 2004). The album's title track reached number one in Belgium and peaked at number four in the Netherlands. In North America, the album track "Can't Shake Loose" was released as the lead-off single, reaching number 29 on the Billboard Hot 100, and number 23 on the RPM Top 50 singles chart in Canada.

Fältskog's next studio album, Eyes of a Woman, produced by Eric Stewart of 10cc, was released in March 1985. "She is quite content to grace the works of various other lesser mortals with her immaculate, sugar-sweet voice", wrote Barry McIlheney in Melody Maker. The album sold well in parts of Europe, peaking at number two in Sweden and reaching the Top 20 in Norway and Belgium, but scraped into the UK Top 40 just for one week. The album sold up to 800,000 copies. The self-penned lead single "I Won't Let You Go" achieved moderate success in Europe, reaching number six in Sweden, number 18 in the Netherlands and number 24 in West Germany.

In 1986, Fältskog recorded another duet, "The Way You Are", with Swedish singer Ola Håkansson, which became her top hit in Sweden, Norway and Brazil.

In early 1987, Fältskog recorded the album Kom följ med i vår karusell ('Come Join Us on Our Carousel') with her son Christian. The album contained songs for children and was sung in Swedish. Agnetha recorded duets with her son and a children's choir for the album. In 1988, it was nominated for the Swedish music prize Grammis in the category 'Barn' (For Children).

In the summer of 1987, Fältskog travelled to Malibu, California, to record her fourth post-ABBA solo album, I Stand Alone, produced by Peter Cetera (formerly of the band Chicago) and Bruce Gaitsch, who had collaborated on Madonna's La Isla Bonita. Released in November of that year, I Stand Alone was a minor hit in Europe, except in Sweden, where it spent eight weeks at number one and became the best-selling album of 1988. More than 300,000 copies were sold throughout Scandinavia. According to Hans Englund, the Swedish head of WEA, more than 800,000 copies were sold globally. However, chart-wise outside Scandinavia, the results were less impressive.

The single "I Wasn't the One (Who Said Goodbye)", on which Fältskog duetted with Peter Cetera, was released primarily in North America, and became her second solo single to chart on the Billboard Hot 100, peaking at number 93. It was also a Top 20 Billboard Adult Contemporary hit. The track (along with "The Last Time" as "La Última Vez") was also recorded in Spanish for the Latin American market as "Yo No Fui Quién Dijo Adiós". Fältskog refused to promote the album in major TV shows in West Germany, but she made a promotional visit to London in February 1988, appearing on The Terry Wogan Show.

=== Hiatus from recording (1988–2004) ===
Following the release of I Stand Alone, Fältskog had a 17-year hiatus from the music industry, during which she made few public appearances and devoted much of her time to astrology, yoga and horse back riding at her isolated country house in Ekerö.

In 1996, her autobiography Som jag är was published in Swedish (and in English the following year titled As I Am), followed by several compilation CDs of her Swedish and English recordings, including one called My Love, My Life for which Fältskog picked out the music herself. Fans welcomed the autobiography. The book was updated in 1998 and released worldwide via Virgin Publishing, selling over 50,000 copies.

=== Return to music and selected public appearances (2004–2010) ===
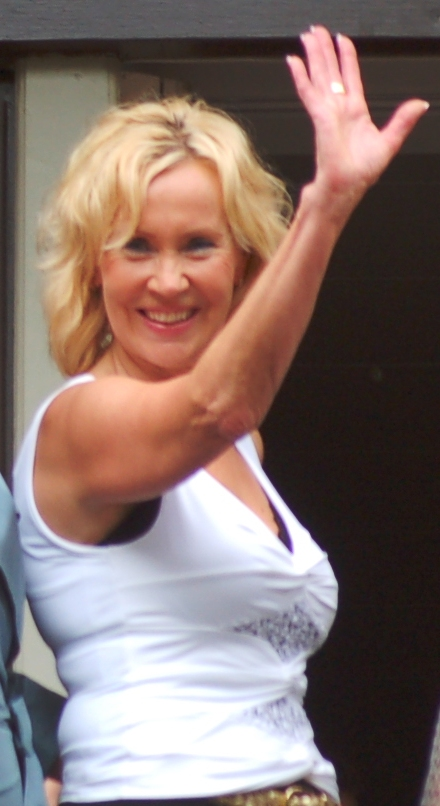
Fältskog in 2008

In April 2004, Fältskog released a new single, "If I Thought You'd Ever Change Your Mind" (a cover of the song originally recorded by Cilla Black). It peaked at number two in Sweden and became Fältskog's highest charting UK single to date, reaching number 11. One week later, the album My Colouring Book, a collection of Fältskog's covers of 1960s classic oldies, was released, topping the chart in Sweden, reaching the top five in Finland and Denmark, and peaking at number six and number 12 in Germany and the UK respectively.

The title track, "My Colouring Book", is a cover of the song originally recorded by Barbra Streisand. The Observer suggested that "time hasn't diminished her perfect voice". Reviewing the release in The Guardian, Caroline Sullivan wrote: "Agnetha Fältskog has a vulnerability that gets under the skin of a song. She may be cheating a trifle by including no original material on this collection of 1960s covers, but if anyone can do justice to the likes of "Sealed with a Kiss", it's her. The soaring sentimentality evokes Cilla Black and Sandie Shaw in their mini-skirted pomp, and I don't say that lightly." The release attracted media attention across Europe, but Fältskog staunchly refused to be involved in any extensive promotion of the album.

A second single release from the album, "When You Walk in the Room", peaked at number 11 in Sweden and entered the UK Top 40 at number 34 (which was still higher than any of her UK singles in the 1980s). "Sometimes When I'm Dreaming", originally recorded by Art Garfunkel, failed to be released as the third single.

Shortly after this release, for the 2004 semi-final of the Eurovision Song Contest, staged in Istanbul 30 years after ABBA had won the contest in Brighton, Fältskog appeared briefly in a special comedy video made for the interval act, entitled "Our Last Video". All four members of the group appeared briefly in cameo roles, as did the singer and actress Cher and comedian Rik Mayall.

In 2004, Fältskog was nominated for Best Nordic Artist at the Nordic Music Awards, and at Christmas of that year, she gave an extensive interview (her first in many years) filmed by Swedish TV. Around the same time, Sony Music released a lavishly produced 6-CD boxed set comprising Fältskog's Swedish solo career (mostly before ABBA), with five original solo albums: 1968, 1969, 1970, 1971, and her 1975 album recorded and released during her time with ABBA – plus an additional compilation disc with bonus tracks.

In 2005, Fältskog appeared with her former bandmates at the opening of the Mamma Mia! musical in Stockholm, and together with ex-husband Björn, also attended the final show in January 2007.

In October 2008, a new compilation album, My Very Best, was released in Sweden. The double CD contains Swedish (CD 1) and English-language hits (CD 2) from her solo career from 1967 to 2004. It reached number four on the Swedish album chart and was certified gold within its first week of release.

On 4 July 2008, Fältskog joined her former bandmates at the Swedish premiere of the film version of Mamma Mia!, held at the Rival Theatre (owned by Andersson) in Mariatorget, Stockholm. Fältskog arrived with Lyngstad and movie star Meryl Streep, the three dancing in front of thousands of fans before joining the film's other stars and Andersson and Ulvaeus on the hotel balcony for the first photograph of all four ABBA members together in 22 years.

In January 2009, Fältskog appeared onstage with Lyngstad at the Swedish Rockbjörnen Awards to receive a lifetime honorary award for ABBA.

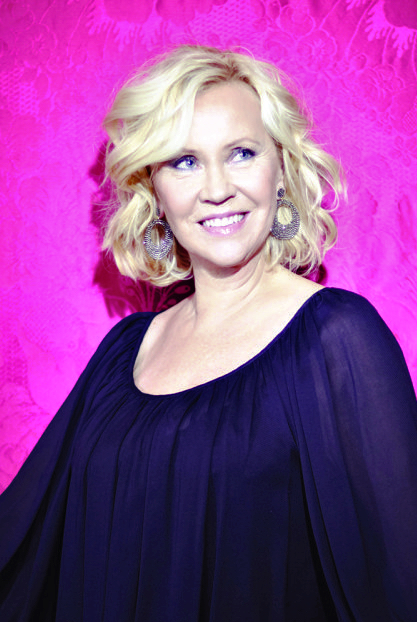
Fältskog in Stockholm Pride 2013

In February 2010, ABBA World, an extensive multimillion-Pound (in monetary value) exhibition, debuted at London's Earls Court and included an extensive interview with Fältskog filmed in Sweden the previous summer. For the exhibition's Melbourne launch, she recorded a light-hearted opening film together with former ABBA colleague Benny Andersson, shot in Stockholm in June 2010.

In October 2010, Fältskog attended the opening of the Mamma Mia! musical in Denmark with former husband, Björn Ulvaeus.

=== A, ABBA Voyage and A+ (2013–present) ===
In May 2013, Fältskog released a new album called A, produced by Jörgen Elofsson and Peter Nordahl. In the UK, the first single, "When You Really Loved Someone", had previously been released for download on 11 March, with the accompanying video also released on the same day. In Germany, the first single was "The One Who Loves You Now", and it was also released for download on 11 March 2013. The album includes a duet with Gary Barlow of Take That, called "I Should've Followed You Home".

In June 2013, officials from Universal Records in the Netherlands said 600,000 copies of A were sold in the first two months after its release. The album managed multiple top five placings in many territories, including Sweden, Norway, Germany, Denmark, Switzerland, The Netherlands, Belgium, Austria, New Zealand and Australia. It charted at number six in the United Kingdom (her highest ever placing in that territory). A few weeks after its release, a TV special made by the BBC helped the album reach the number six position in the UK album chart for a second time. The first single from the album to be released in the US, "Dance Your Pain Away", was released on 28 May 2013. The digital single included two new mixes by Smash Mode. "Dance Your Pain Away" was released internationally as a single on 15 July 2013.

On 17 May 2013, Fältskog was awarded the SKAP 2013 Kai Gullmar Memorial Award at the Stockholm release party for A. On 12 November 2013, Fältskog sang live on stage for the first time in 25 years at the BBC Children in Need Rocks 2013 concert in London; she sang a duet with Gary Barlow, the organiser of the event, performing the single "I Should've Followed You Home" from Agnetha's album 'A'. On 18 November 2013, to promote the song, a video for "I Should've Followed You Home" was shot the same day as the single release. Although the single was released in most countries in November 2013, its release in the UK was held over. She also won Best Female Album – 6th Annual Scandipop 2014 and was nominated for the German 2014 ECHO award in the Artist Rock/Pop International category.

In April 2016, a new biography of Fältskog by Daniel Ward, Agnetha Fältskog – The Girl with the Golden Hair, was published in the UK.

In the summer of 2017, Faltskög joined her ABBA bandmates Frida Lyngstad, Björn Ulvaeus and Benny Andersson to record two new songs, "I Still Have Faith in You" and "Don't Shut Me Down". These songs were meant to be part of an ABBA-themed TV special that was eventually discarded and replaced by the more ambitious, digital-laden Voyage show.

On 2 September 2021, via YouTube Livestream, ABBA announced their upcoming virtual concert residency "ABBA Voyage", as well as the imminent release of an eponymous album, recorded between 2017 and 2021. The new record, their first studio album in 40 years, features ten tracks, including "I Still Have Faith In You" and "Don't Shut Me Down", which were first shown in the aforementioned Livestream event and released as a double A-side single. On 5 November 2021, the Voyage album was released worldwide. On 27 May 2022, ABBA Voyage opened in a purpose-built venue named the ABBA Arena at the Queen Elizabeth Olympic Park in London.

Fältskog's official social media sources were updated on 23 August 2023 hinting at a new album/single called "Where Do We Go From Here?". The new song was released on 31 August 2023, and had its radio premiere on Zoe Ball's Breakfast show on BBC Radio 2. Her album called A+, released on 13 October 2023, was also announced.

== Personal life ==
On 6 July 1971, Fältskog married Björn Ulvaeus. They had two children, including Linda Ulvaeus. The couple announced their separation in January 1979, and their divorce was finalised in July 1980.

Fältskog's split from Ulvaeus in 1979 greatly affected her, and she needed therapy afterwards.

In 1990, Fältskog married Swedish surgeon Tomas Sonnenfeld, and the couple divorced in 1993.

In 1994, Fältskog's mother died by suicide by jumping from her Jönköping apartment balcony. Fältskog's resulting depression worsened a year later when her father died.

In 1997, Fältskog started a relationship with a Dutch forklift driver, Gert van der Graaf. After Fältskog ended the relationship in 1999, he stalked her further at her mansion, resulting in a court issuing Van der Graaf with a restraining order and deporting him to the Netherlands in 2000. Returning close to her home in 2003, he was arrested and then banned from entering Sweden. Within months of the order expiring in 2005, Van der Graaf was sighted near Fältskog's estate in Ekerö.

Fältskog currently lives in Ekerö, Stockholm County. She has four grandchildren. Dutch guitarist and songwriter Harry Vanda of the Easybeats and Vanda & Young is Fältskog's second cousin.

Fältskog had a fear of flying, which worsened during ABBA's 1979 US tour, when the band's plane, heading to Boston was short of fuel, hit a tornado and performed an emergency landing. Fältskog said in 2013 that she needed therapy to deal with the fear. During her solo career years, Fältskog would always travel by bus and was in a bus accident on a Swedish motorway in 1983.

On 21 March 2024, shortly before the 50th anniversary of their win at the Eurovision Song Contest, all four members of ABBA were appointed Commander, First Class, of the Royal Order of Vasa by Carl XVI Gustaf. This was the first time in almost 50 years that the Swedish Royal Orders of Knighthood was bestowed on anybody. ABBA shared the honour with nine others.

== Distinctions ==
- Sweden: Royal Order of Vasa, Commander First Class (21 March 2024)

== Discography ==
Swedish-language albums

- Agnetha Fältskog (1968)
- Agnetha Fältskog Vol. 2 (1969)
- Som jag är (1970)
- När en vacker tanke blir en sång (1971)
- Jesus Christ Superstar (1972) (soundtrack by various artists)
- Elva kvinnor i ett hus (1975)
- Nu tändas tusen juleljus (1981) (with Linda Ulvaeus)
- Kom följ med i vår karusell (1987) (with Christian Ulvaeus)

English-language albums

- Wrap Your Arms Around Me (1983)
- Eyes of a Woman (1985)
- I Stand Alone (1987)
- My Colouring Book (2004)
- A (2013)
- A+ (2023)

German-language albums

- Geh' Mit Gott (1994)

== Filmography ==
Year	Title	Role	Notes
1977	ABBA: The Movie	Herself	
1982	Nöjesmaskinen	Herself	(Guest appearance)
1983	Raskenstam	Lisa Mattson	Alternative title: Casanova of Sweden

== Bibliography ==
- 1997 – As I Am: ABBA Before & Beyond (ISBN 1-85227-654-1)

== Notes ==
Awards and achievements
Preceded by (Luxembourg) Anne-Marie David with "Tu te reconnaîtras"	Winner of the Eurovision Song Contest; 1974 (as part of ABBA)	Succeeded by (Netherlands) Teach-In with "Ding-A-Dong"
Preceded by Nova with "You're Summer"	Sweden in the Eurovision Song Contest; 1974 (as part of ABBA)	Succeeded by Lars Berghagen with "Jennie, Jennie"
