= Pop Idol discography =

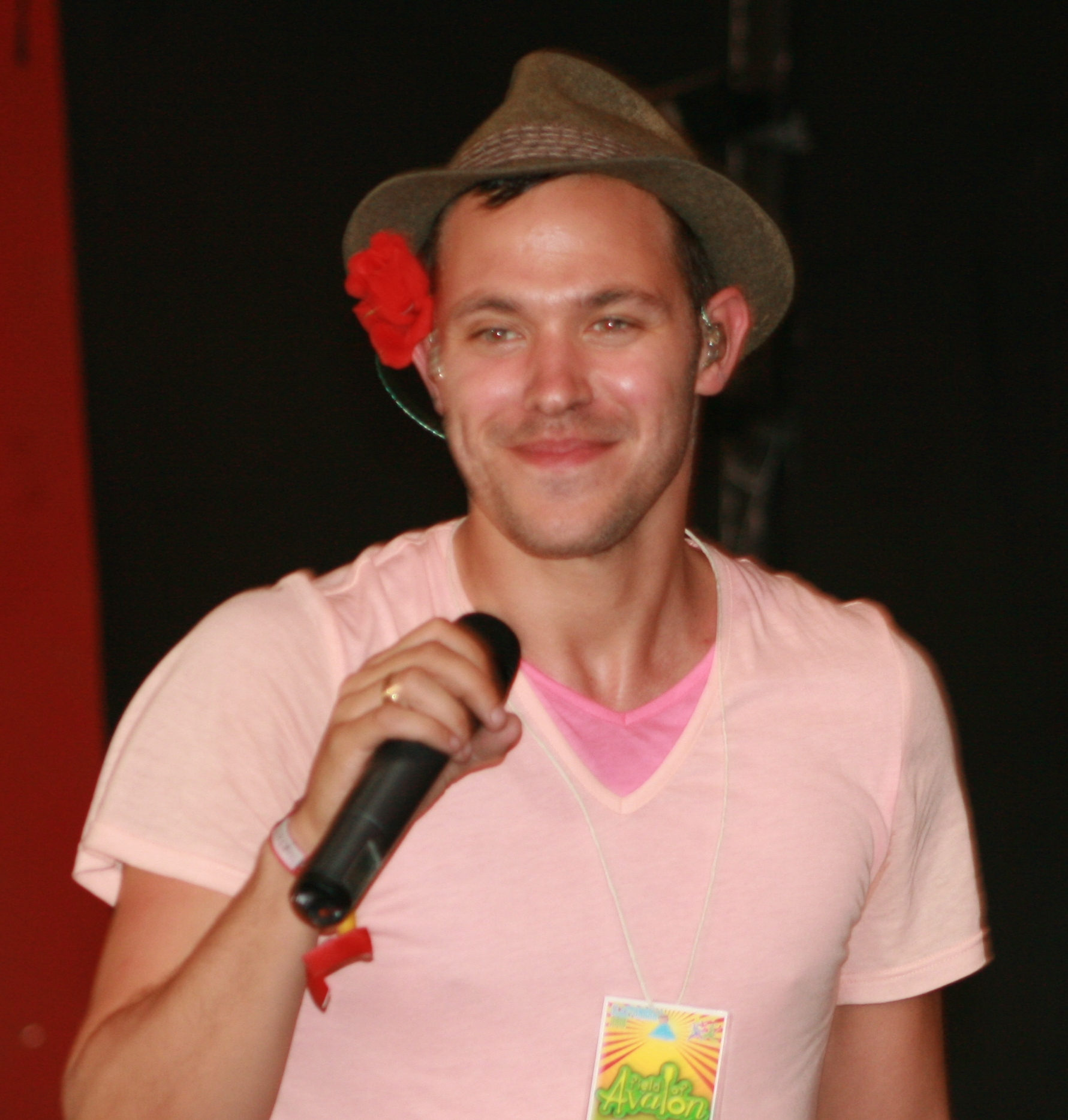
Will Young was the winner of the first series of Pop Idol. He has subsequently recorded thirteen top-40 singles and seven top-10 albums.

Pop Idol was a British television talent show that ran for two series, in 2001 and 2003. The show was produced for ITV in a reality television format and aimed to unearth a previously undiscovered singer who could become an international success. Will Young was the winner of the first series and was awarded with a £1 million music recording contract. Young became the most successful contestant with a series of top-five hits, including his debut single "Anything Is Possible" / "Evergreen", which peaked at number one on the UK Singles Chart in 2002 and broke chart sales figure records. During the next seven years he recorded two further number-one singles ("Light My Fire" and "Leave Right Now"), while two of his four albums were number-one in the UK Albums Chart. In the second series, Michelle McManus emerged victorious. Her debut single "All This Time" charted at number one in January 2003. Her second single, "The Meaning of Love", charted at a peak of number 16 and an album of the same name reached number three in the UK Albums Chart.

A number of artists who did not win either series of Pop Idol have also had success in the British charts. Gareth Gates, who finished as the runner-up behind Young in the first series, scored a number-one hit with a cover of "Unchained Melody" in March 2002, replacing Young's debut single at the top of the charts. Gates' subsequent releases "Anyone of Us (Stupid Mistake)" and the double A-side "The Long and Winding Road" / "Suspicious Minds" both reached the top of the charts in 2002. After "What My Heart Wants to Say" ended this run of number-one singles, Gates was joined by The Kumars to record the Comic Relief single for 2003, "Spirit in the Sky". He achieved several more top-20 hits in 2003. After three years away from the music industry, Gates briefly returned in 2007 with a new album – Pictures of the Other Side, which charted at number 23 – and two top-40 singles.

Darius Danesh, who finished in third place in the first series, had a string of successful singles and a top-10 album, including his debut single "Colourblind", which reached number one in August 2002. Other contestants from the first series to have chart success were Sarah Whatmore (who failed to make the selection for the live shows), Rosie Ribbons, Rik Waller, Jessica Garlick and Zoe Birkett. Garlick was additionally chosen to represent the United Kingdom at the Eurovision Song Contest in 2002, where she finished third in the competition. Sam Nixon and Mark Rhodes were the only contestants from the second series, other than McManus, to release a charting single. Rhodes finished as runner-up in the competition while Nixon finished third. Within months they formed a duo under the name Sam & Mark. They released a cover of The Beatles' "With a Little Help from My Friends" as a double-A side with "Measure of a Man". This earned them a debut number-one single in January 2002, while they also reached the top-20 with a follow-up, "The Sun Has Come Your Way" before being dropped by their record label, 19.

As of December 2015, Pop Idol contestants have had 14 charting albums, with McManus the only participant from the second series to peak inside the top-100. Forty-three singles released by Pop Idol contestants have charted in the United Kingdom. Young has had 17 singles peak within the top-100, followed by Gates with nine entries. Darius Danesh has also had six charting songs.

== Singles ==
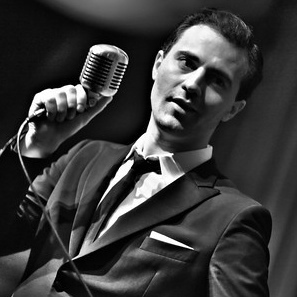
Darius Danesh, who finished third in the first series of the show, debuted at number-one with "Colourblind" in August 2002.

Only songs charted in the Top-100 in the UK Singles Chart are included in this list.

Artist(s)	Series	Position in Show	Song title(s)	Release date	UK peak chart position	Ref
Will Young	1	Winner	"Anything Is Possible" / "Evergreen"	25 February 2002	1	
Will Young	1	Winner	"Light My Fire"	25 May 2002	1	
Will Young	1	Winner	"The Long and Winding Road"	23 September 2002	1	
Will Young	1	Winner	"Don't Let Me Down" / "You and I"	18 November 2002	2	
Will Young	1	Winner	"Leave Right Now"	24 November 2003	1	
Will Young	1	Winner	"Your Game"	15 March 2004	3	
Will Young	1	Winner	"Friday's Child"	5 July 2004	4	
Will Young	1	Winner	"Switch It On"	14 November 2005	5	
Will Young	1	Winner	"All Time Love"	16 January 2006	3	
Will Young	1	Winner	"Who Am I"	24 April 2006	11	
Will Young	1	Winner	"Changes"	15 September 2008	10	
Will Young	1	Winner	"Grace"	22 December 2008	33	
Will Young	1	Winner	"Let It Go"	2 March 2009	58	
Will Young	1	Winner	"Hopes & Fears"	8 November 2009	65	
Will Young	1	Winner	"Jealousy"	19 November 2011	5	
Will Young	1	Winner	"Come On"	21 November 2011	83	
Will Young	1	Winner	"Losing Myself"	18 March 2012	72	
Gareth Gates	1	Runner Up	"Unchained Melody"	18 March 2002	1	
Gareth Gates	1	Runner Up	"Anyone of Us (Stupid Mistake)"	8 July 2002	1	
Gareth Gates	1	Runner Up	"The Long and Winding Road" / "Suspicious Minds"^{[B]}	23 September 2002	1	
Gareth Gates	1	Runner Up	"What My Heart Wants to Say"	9 December 2002	5	
Gareth Gates	1	Runner Up	"Spirit in the Sky"^{[C]}	10 March 2003	1	
Gareth Gates	1	Runner Up	"Sunshine"	13 September 2003	3	
Gareth Gates	1	Runner Up	"Say It Isn't So"	8 December 2003	4	
Gareth Gates	1	Runner Up	"Changes"	9 April 2007	14	
Gareth Gates	1	Runner Up	"Angel on My Shoulder"	18 June 2007	22	
Darius Danesh	1	Third	"Colourblind"	29 July 2002	1	
Darius Danesh	1	Third	"Rushes"	25 November 2002	5	
Darius Danesh	1	Third	"Incredible (What I Meant to Say)"	3 March 2003	9	
Darius Danesh	1	Third	"Girl in the Moon"	9 June 2003	21	
Darius Danesh	1	Third	"Kinda Love"	18 October 2004	8	
Darius Danesh	1	Third	Live Twice	10 January 2005	7	
Rosie Ribbons	1	4th	"Blink"	21 October 2002	12	
Rosie Ribbons	1	4th	"A Little Bit"	13 January 2003	19	
Zoe Birkett	1	6th	"Treat Me Like a Lady"	13 January 2003	12	
Jessica Garlick	1	9th	"Come Back"^{[A]}	13 May 2002	13	
Rik Waller	1	10th	"I Will Always Love You"	4 March 2002	6	
Rik Waller	1	10th	Something Inside (So Strong)"	24 June 2002	25	
Sarah Whatmore	1	Heat 5	"When I Lost You"	9 September 2002	6	
Sarah Whatmore	1	Heat 5	"Automatic"	10 February 2003	11	
Michelle McManus	2	Winner	"All This Time"	25 November 2003	1	
Michelle McManus	2	Winner	"The Meaning of Love"	26 January 2004	16	
Sam Nixon and Mark Rhodes^{[D]}	2	Runner's Up	"With a Little Help from My Friends" / "Measure of a Man"	9 February 2004	1	
Sam Nixon and Mark Rhodes^{[D]}	2	Runner's Up	"The Sun Has Come Your Way"	24 May 2004	19	
Jodie Connor	2	Final 50	"Good Times" (with Roll Deep)	26 April 2010	1	
Jodie Connor	2	Final 50	"Now or Never" (featuring Wiley)	13 January 2011	14	
Jodie Connor	2	Final 50	"Bring It" (with Tinchy Stryder)	20 February 2011	37	

== Albums ==
=== Solo albums ===
Only albums that charted in the Top 100 of the UK Albums Chart are included in this list.

Artist	Series	Album title	Release date	UK peak chart position	Ref
Will Young	1	From Now On	7 October 2002	1	
Will Young	1	Friday's Child	1 December 2003	1	
Will Young	1	Keep On	21 November 2005	2	
Will Young	1	Let It Go	29 September 2008	2	
Will Young	1	The Hits	16 November 2009	9	
Will Young	1	Echoes	19 August 2011	1	
Will Young	1	The Essential	14 October 2013	15	
Will Young	1	85% Proof	25 May 2015	1	
Will Young	1	Lexicon	21 June 2019	2	
Gareth Gates	1	What My Heart Wants to Say	26 October 2002	2	
Gareth Gates	1	Go Your Own Way	22 September 2003	11	
Gareth Gates	1	Pictures of the Other Side	25 June 2007	23	
Darius Danesh	1	Dive In	2 December 2002	6	
Darius Danesh	1	Live Twice	25 October 2004	36	
Michelle McManus	2	The Meaning of Love	16 February 2004	3	

=== Pop Idol albums ===
In addition to the solo material released by the contestants, Sony BMG released two CDs featuring songs performed by the finalists, one for each series of the show.

Album title	Series	Release date	UK peak chart position	Ref
Pop Idol: The Big Band Album	1	April 2002	—	
Pop Idol: The Idols - Xmas Factor	2	December 2003	—	

=== Other releases ===
Several contestants also released songs which failed to reach the main singles or albums charts. Rosie Ribbons recorded an album entitled Misbehaving but was dropped by her record label, Telstar Records, when they ran into financial difficulties and the album was only released in a promotional version. Jessica Garlick released "Hard Not to Fall" as a download single on 11 May 2009 to coincide with the Eurovision Song Contest 2009.

Will Young additionally appeared as a featured artist on the Band Aid 20 UK number-one charity single "Do They Know It's Christmas?" in 2004.

== By artist ==
Artist	Top-100 singles entries	Top-100 albums entries	Number-one singles	Number-one albums
Will Young	17	8	4^{[E]}	4
Gareth Gates	9	3	4^{[E]}	—
Darius Danesh	6	2	1	—
Michelle McManus	2	1	1	—
Sam & Mark	2	—	1	—
Sarah Whatmore	2	—	—	—
Rik Waller	2	—	—	—
Rosie Ribbons	2	—	—	—
Zoe Birkett	1	—	—	—
Jessica Garlick	1	—	—	—

== Chart records ==
"Unchained Melody" and "Anything Is Possible" / "Evergreen" became two of the most successful singles of the 2000s, selling more than 1 million copies, two of only 10 songs that achieved that feat during the decade. "Anything Is Possible" / "Evergreen" sold 385,000 copies during its first day of sale in a single chain of record stores, Virgin Megastores, beating the total of 160,000 copies of Hear’Say's "Pure and Simple" in 2001. Hear'Say sold 550,000 during a whole week, while Young had advance orders of 1.2 million copies at HMV record stores. It beat Band Aid's record of 750,000 sales in the first week of release, eventually reaching 1.2 million sales. Young's song was named as the biggest-selling single of the decade at the end of 2009, with Gates' debut finishing in second place.

== Notes ==
- ^{A} Jessica Garlick was chosen to represent the United Kingdom in the Eurovision Song Contest 2002, where she performed "Come Back". She finished third in the competition and the song charted at #13 in the UK Singles Chart.
- ^{B} "The Long and Winding Road" / "Suspicious Minds" was released as a double A-side single. Gareth Gates and Will Young were featured on the former but the latter was sung only by Gates.
- ^{C} Gareth Gates collaborated with The Kumars from the television programme The Kumars at No. 42 for the 2003 Comic Relief single, a cover of "Spirit in the Sky".
- ^{D} Sam Nixon and Mark Rhodes recorded under the name Sam & Mark.
- ^{E} The figure includes the joint number-one "The Long and Winding Road" / "Suspicious Minds".

== See also ==
- Popstars (UK TV series) discography
- Fame Academy discography
- The X Factor (UK) discography
