= Darius Danesh discography =

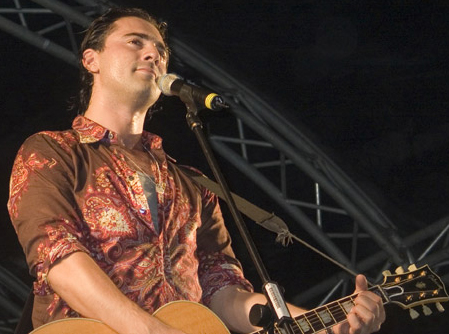
- Darius Campbell performing live during an onstage performance
- Studio albums: 2
- Compilation albums: 1
- Singles: 6
- B-sides: 23
- Video albums: 1
- Music videos: 6

The discography of Scottish singer-songwriter Darius Danesh consists of two studio albums, one compilation album, one video album, six music videos and six singles during his lifetime. His debut album Dive In (2002) was released following the success of his debut single "Colourblind". Released in July 2002, it debuted atop the singles charts in his native Scotland as well as the United Kingdom, whilst it reached the top ten of the Billboard European Hot 100 Singles chart. Additionally, it achieved commercial success in territories including Australia, the Netherlands and Ireland, and was certified Gold by the British Phonographic Industry (BPI) indicating sales of over 400,000 copies. The album spawned another three singles – "Rushes", "Incredible (What I Meant to Say)" and "Girl in the Moon" and was certified Platinum by the BPI.

His second, and final studio album before his death, Live Twice was released in October 2004. Whilst it largely failed to match the commercial success of his debut album, it did still peak within the top ten of the albums charts in Scotland, as well as within the top forty of the albums charts in the United Kingdom. It spawned two commercially successful singles – "Kinda Love" and "Live Twice". In February 2005, he released his first video album, Darius: The Story So Far.

He appeared as a featured artist on Pop Idol: The Big Band Album with the track "Let There Be Love" in 2002, and in the same year featured on "Pretty Flamingo" for the War Child: 1 Love Album release. In 2010, he appeared on the reality show Popstar to Operastar and subsequently won the competition.

== Albums ==
=== Studio albums ===
List of studio albums, with selected details, chart positions and certifications
Title	Album details	Peak chart positions		Certifications
Title	Album details	SCO	UK	Certifications
Dive In	Released: 2 December 2002; Label: Mercury; Formats: CD, digital download	3	6	BPI: Platinum
Live Twice	Released: 25 October 2004; Label: Mercury; Formats: CD, digital download	10	36	

=== Video albums ===
List of video albums, with selected details
Title	Details
Darius: The Story So Far	Released: 28 February 2005; Format: DVD; Label:

=== Compilation albums ===
- Pop Idol: The Big Band Album (2002)

== Singles ==
List of singles, with selected chart positions and certifications
Title	Year	Chart positions					Certifications	Album
Title	Year	SCO	AUS	IRE	NER	UK	Certifications	Album
"Colourblind"	2002	1	61	13	75	1	BPI: Gold	Dive In
"Rushes"	2002	2	—	—	—	5		Dive In
"Incredible (What I Meant to Say)"	2003	7	—	21	—	9		Dive In
"Girl in the Moon"	2003	13	—	—	—	21		Dive In
"Kinda Love"	2004	2	—	—	—	8		Live Twice
"Live Twice"	2005	4	—	24	—	7		Live Twice

== Other appearances ==
List of other non-single song appearances
Title	Year	Album
"Let There Be Love"	2002	Pop Idol: The Big Band Album
"Pretty Flamingo"	2002	War Child: 1 Love Album
"Sandy"	2003	Greasemania
