= Swing When You're Winning =

Studio album of cover songs by Robbie Williams
- Released: 19 November 2001
- Recorded: 2001
- Studios: Capitol, Hollywood; Sony Music, London; AIR, London; Avatar, New York City; Electric Lady, New York City; Mayfair, London; Angel, London; Battery, London
- Genre: Swing
- Length: 53.00
- Label: Chrysalis
- Producers: Guy Chambers; Steve Power

Robbie Williams chronology
Sing When You're Winning (2000)	Swing When You're Winning (2001)	Escapology (2002)

Singles from Swing When You're Winning
- 1. "Somethin' Stupid" Released: 14 December 2001; 2. "Mr. Bojangles / I Will Talk and Hollywood Will Listen" Released: 11 March 2002

Swing When You're Winning is a swing cover album by English singer-songwriter Robbie Williams, and his fourth studio album overall. It was released in the United Kingdom on 19 November 2001 and peaked at number one on the UK Albums Chart, becoming his fastest-selling album in the country. Williams was inspired by the Rat Pack era, especially singer Frank Sinatra, and recorded the album with a big band orchestra over several weeks during a break in his 2001 tour. One song, "I Will Talk and Hollywood Will Listen", is an original composition.

The album's title is a play on Williams' previous album Sing When You're Winning. The album's lead single, "Somethin' Stupid", was a duet with Nicole Kidman that topped the UK Singles Chart. In 2013, Williams returned to swing for his tenth studio album Swings Both Ways. Unlike Swing When You're Winning, however, the sequel is nearly evenly divided between covers and original songs penned by Williams and Guy Chambers.

== Background ==
After the success of his third studio album, Sing When You're Winning, Williams wanted to take another musical direction. Williams had been asked to guest on a swing or traditional-style version of the standard, "That Old Black Magic" as a duet with Jane Horrocks the year before. The song had been previously recorded by Frank Sinatra amongst others, and this era of music, singing standards with an orchestra, along with an old-fashioned, Rat Pack glamour, was a style that Williams was fond of. Inspired by this, he took two weeks off his tour to record what would be his fourth studio album, an album he described as the "big band album he had always dreamed of making." The album was released in November 2001. Consisting mainly of swing covers common to the Great American Songbook, the album counts as Williams' fourth studio album. Aside from the title, the album is not directly associated with Williams' previous album, Sing When You're Winning. Born from his lifelong love for Frank Sinatra, combined with the success of the track "Have You Met Miss Jones?" that he recorded for the film Bridget Jones's Diary in early 2001, the album was recorded at the Capitol Studios in Los Angeles, and was symbolically released under the Capitol label.

The album features duets with actors Rupert Everett, Nicole Kidman, Jon Lovitz and Jane Horrocks, as well as a special guest performance from Williams' friend and former flatmate Jonathan Wilkes. Surprisingly the album features a duet with Frank Sinatra who died in 1998, on the song "It Was a Very Good Year", in which the instrumental backing track is sampled from the original Sinatra recording, the first two verses are sung by Williams, and, for the third and fourth verses, Sinatra's original vocal track is used. Williams explains this came about after one of his session musicians played his vocals to Sinatra's family. This musician was purportedly a good friend of the family, and played with Sinatra on the original release of "It Was a Very Good Year". Another surprising guest musician is pianist Bill Miller, who accompanies Williams on "One for My Baby". Miller played on many of Sinatra's tours and recordings, among them, the original 1954 soundtrack recording of "One for My Baby" and the 1958 Capitol studio recording. Additionally, backing musicians for portions of the album include the London Session Orchestra. The album's lead song, "I Will Talk and Hollywood Will Listen", is the only original song on the album. Additionally, Williams' cover of Bobby Darin's English-language cover of "La Mer", titled "Beyond the Sea", played over the closing credits of the 2003 Disney/Pixar animated motion picture Finding Nemo.

== Singles ==
"Somethin' Stupid", a duet with Nicole Kidman, was released as the album's first single. A cover of Frank and Nancy Sinatra, the song became Williams' fifth number 1 in the United Kingdom, selling almost 100,000 copies in the week of release, as well as hitting the top spot in Argentina, New Zealand, Latvia and scoring top ten placings all over Europe. It became one of the biggest hits of 2001, selling over 200,000 copies in the UK alone after spending three weeks at the top of the charts, being certified Silver in January 2002.

A double A-side of "Mr. Bojangles" and "I Will Talk and Hollywood Will Listen" was released as the album's second and final single; however, it was only released in Central and Eastern Europe.

== Critical reception ==
Professional ratings
Review scores
Source	Rating
AllMusic	4/5 stars
Drowned in Sound	1/10
The Encyclopedia of Popular Music	3/5 stars
The Great Rock Discography	5/10
NME	2.5/5 stars
Slant Magazine	4/5 stars

In a retrospective review John Bush of AllMusic rated the album four out of five stars, saying the album is "a surprisingly natural fit with its intended target: '50s trad-pop patriarchs like Frank Sinatra and Dean Martin. And just like those two loveable rogues, Williams has brawled and boozed in the past, but isn't afraid to wear his heart on his sleeve; in fact, he's one of the few modern pop stars to fully embrace affecting balladry and nuanced singing." American publication Slant Magazine also rated the album four out of five stars, saying the album is "doused with cheeky humor" and that "Britain's bad boy proves that not only can he artfully capture our attention, he's actually worthy of it." NME were more mixed in their opinion, rating the album 5/10 and saying the album "mistakes celebrity for entertainment, cabaret for class."

Larry Flick of The Advocate noted the occasional queer references in the lyrics and Williams' adlibs and believed the album affirms the singer is "a performer of considerably more depth than he's previously revealed", comparing his reinvention on Swing When You're Winning to "a modern-day hybrid of Frank Sinatra and Bobby Darin" on a mix of both predictable and less obvious standards delivered "with a perpetual wink and a smile." Jane Holly opined in The Rough Guide to Rock (2003) that the album was an unusual move for a star at "the top of his game", believing that Williams' "sheer charisma" carried the record but qualifying that his voice was not comparable to Sinatra's, finally deeming it an "excessive indulgence". However, Holly did praise "Somethin' Stupid" as a "sexy and smooth duet." In The Great Rock Discography (2006), author Martin C. Strong deemed the album an "easy listening tribute" to Rat Pack stars like Sinatra and Martin, aimed at Williams' eager fanbase, with the singer's "swell guy persona gorging itself" on the material.

== Commercial performance ==
The album spent 57 weeks on the UK Albums Chart, certified 7× Platinum, and became the 49th best-selling album of all time in the UK. It became his fastest-selling album in the UK, selling over 1,800,000 copies in seven weeks. At one point, Williams simultaneously topped the albums, singles and DVD charts, a rare feat. In Germany, the album has become Williams' best-selling album there, selling more than 1,500,000 copies being certified 5× Platinum. The album debuted at No. 1 and stayed there for nine non-consecutive weeks. It managed to stay 83 weeks on the German Albums Chart, nineteen weeks of those in the top 10. Thanks to its success, it became the fourth best-selling album of the decade in Germany. In 2001 the album was the 17th best-selling album globally, selling 4.4 million copies.

== Legacy ==
Entertainment.ie credits the album for starting a "craze" for big band tribute-style albums. Pop Idol: The Big Band Album (2002), an album of big band songs sung by the contestants of series 1 of Pop Idol, was one such similar album inspired by Swing When You're Winning. Zoe Birkett, one of the contestants who performs on the album, said "we've all listened to [Swing When You're Winning] and it's really brilliant music." Westlife's Rat Pack covers album ...Allow Us to Be Frank (2004) was also inspired by Swing When You're Winning, and was compared to it in reviews. In 2016, Tom Eames of Digital Spy credited the success of Swing When You're Winning with inspiring "every single big band/jazz compilation ever since from Rod Stewart to Michael Bublé." The influence of the project also became apparent on reality television, with producer Simon Cowell soon favouring annual "Big Band Weeks" on series like The X Factor.

Dorian Lynskey of Q credits the album for helping the cult appeal of the Rat Pack – Sinatra, Martin, Sammy Davis Jr. and Peter Lawford – enjoy one of its occasional booms, continued by the release of the film Ocean's Eleven (2002). Describing the album as "Robbie's leap into the past", Freaky Trigger's Tom Ewing agreed the album "landed in a rising cultural moment for the Rat Pack and their era", noting that exemplified a maturation of lad culture as it moved into the 2000s, by "[keeping] the camaraderie and the bad behaviour but dial up the wardrobe, play it sophisticated. Frank, Dean, Sammy and the boys looked very appealing in this context. For a pop star wanting to make a parallel shift, seeking an opt-out from cheek, they were just as tempting." According to Lynskey, Williams feigns a nonchalance comparable to Dean Martin, "but his compulsion to be loved by all is pure Sinatra." EMI's Mark Collen spoke of Williams taking on Sinatra's songs and style: "It's a big thing for anyone to attempt, but he does have a glamorous lifestyle that we'd all like to have, he is a bit naughty. It's not a million miles from what the Rat Pack was about."

=== Retrospective appraisal ===
A contributor to Paul Simpson's The Rough Guide to Cult Pop (2003) believes Swing When You're Winning may sound "close to karaoke" to fans of Williams' debut album Life Thru a Lens (1997), but conceded that it contains several great songs "and, a decade on from now, may well be re-evaluated." Mark Beaumont, writing for NME in 2016, included it on his list of eight of the all-time best-selling albums in the UK that have no redeeming features whatsoever. In an article for Digital Spy, Eames ranked it as Williams' worst album, contending that, although not a bad record, the duets with Jonathan Wilkes, Lovitz and Everett had lost their appeal. He did however praise the original song "I Will Talk and Hollywood Listen" as one of Williams' "all-time best tracks ever." Caitlin Moran of The Times later referred to it as "a light-hearted, gran-pleasing album of swing covers", while The Village Voice's James Hunter wrote of "the sweetheart Sinatraesque standards Williams animated so excellently".

== Live performances ==
A live performance of the album from The Royal Albert Hall was released on DVD in December 2001. It has become one of the best selling music DVDs of all time in Europe, being certified 6× Platinum in the United Kingdom alone and 2× Platinum in Germany. The performance includes renditions of nearly all of the songs from the album, with guest appearances from Jonathan Wilkes, Jon Lovitz, and Jane Horrocks, as well as a live version of Robbie's 'duet' with Frank Sinatra. Rupert Everett emceed, and Nicole Kidman attended the show, but neither performed their duets featured on the album. Thus, "They Can't Take That Away from Me" and "Somethin' Stupid" were the only songs from the album which were not performed live. Additionally, there were three songs performed live which did not appear on the album: "The Lady Is a Tramp", which featured as a B-side to "Mr. Bojangles", and "Let's Face the Music and Dance" and "My Way", which features as B-sides to "Somethin' Stupid".

On the occasion of the European premiere of the Disney movie Finding Nemo in November 2003 in Berlin, Williams, accompanied by a youth orchestra, gave a live performance of several songs of the album in the subway station "Bundestag" (which at that time was only structurally completed) in front of a few hundred invited premiere guests.

Williams gave a rare performance of "Mack the Knife" at Elizabeth II's Diamond Jubilee Concert in June 2012, and he performed four songs from this album on his first Swing tour in 2014, in promotion of his second swing album Swings Both Ways.

== Track listing ==
All tracks produced by Guy Chambers; except "Somethin' Stupid" and "Things" produced by Chambers and Steve Power.

No.	Title	Writer(s)	Length
1.	"I Will Talk and Hollywood Will Listen"	Robbie Williams, Guy Chambers	3:17
2.	"Mack the Knife"	Marc Blitzstein, Bertolt Brecht, Kurt Weill	3:18
3.	"Somethin' Stupid" (with Nicole Kidman)	Carson Parks	2:50
4.	"Do Nothin' Till You Hear from Me"	Duke Ellington, Bob Russell	2:58
5.	"It Was a Very Good Year" (with Frank Sinatra)	Ervin Drake	4:28
6.	"Straighten Up and Fly Right"	Nat King Cole, Irving Mills	2:36
7.	"Well, Did You Evah" (with Jon Lovitz)	Cole Porter	3:50
8.	"Mr. Bojangles"	Jerry Jeff Walker	3:17
9.	"One for My Baby"	Harold Arlen, Johnny Mercer	4:17
10.	"Things" (with Jane Horrocks)	Bobby Darin	3:22
11.	"Ain't That a Kick in the Head"	Sammy Cahn, Jimmy Van Heusen	2:27
12.	"They Can't Take That Away from Me" (with Rupert Everett)	George Gershwin, Ira Gershwin	3:07
13.	"Have You Met Miss Jones?" (from Bridget Jones's Diary)	Lorenz Hart, Richard Rodgers	2:34
14.	"Me and My Shadow" (with Jonathan Wilkes)	Dave Dreyer, Al Jolson, Billy Rose	3:16
15.	"Beyond the Sea"	Jack Lawrence & Charles Trenet	4:32
16.	"Outtakes" (hidden track)		2:51

Japanese bonus tracks
No.	Title	Writer(s)	Length
17.	"The Lady Is a Tramp"	Lorenz Hart, Richard Rodgers	3:00
18.	"That's Life"	Kelly Gordon, Dean Kay	3:06

Special edition bonus DVD
No.	Title	Length
1.	"Live at the Royal Albert Hall"	1:43:05

Asian special edition bonus VCD
No.	Title	Length
1.	"Angels" (music video)
2.	"She's the One" (music video)
3.	"Rock DJ" (music video)
4.	"Better Man" (music video)
5.	"Supreme" (music video)
6.	"Eternity" (music video)

Notes

- "It Was a Very Good Year": Original recording produced by Sonny Burke.
- "They Can't Take That Away from Me": Rupert Everett's vocals produced by Nicky Holland.

== Personnel ==
- Robbie Williams – vocals
- Chuck Berghofer – bass guitar
- Bruce Otto – trombone
- Wayne Bergeron – trumpet
- Ralph Salmins – drums
- Jim Cox – piano
- Craig Ware – trombone
- Gary Foster – alto saxophone
- Harold Jones – drums
- Andy Macintosh – alto saxophone
- Alex Illes – trombone
- Beverley Dahlke-Smith – baritone saxophone
- Chuck Findley – trumpet
- George Doering – guitar
- Phil Todd – baritone saxophone
- Sam Burgess – double bass
- Sal Lozano – tenor saxophone
- Bill Miller – piano
- Frank Ricotti – percussion
- Dave Stewart – trombone
- Stuart Brooks – trumpet
- Eric Marienthal – alto saxophone
- Gordon Campbell – trombone
- John Barclay – trumpet
- Dan Higgins – alto saxophone
- Dave Bishop – tenor saxophone
- Greg Huckins – baritone saxophone
- Andy Martin – trombone
- Brian Kilgore – percussion
- Phil Teele – trombone
- Dave Catlin-Birch – bass guitar
- Chris White – tenor saxophone
- Jamie Talbot – saxophone
- Jeff Bunnell – trumpet
- Bill Liston – alto saxophone
- Mitch Dalton – electric guitar
- Paul Spong – trumpet
- Anthony Kerr – vibraphone
- Steve Sidwell – trumpet
- Brian Kilgore – percussion
- Steven Holtman – trombone
- Dave Arch – piano
- Dennis Farias – trumpet

== Charts ==
=== Weekly charts ===
Chart (2001–05)	Peak position
Argentine Albums (CAPIF)	5
Australian Albums (ARIA)	3
Austrian Albums (Ö3 Austria)	1
Belgian Albums (Ultratop Flanders)	2
Belgian Albums (Ultratop Wallonia)	5
Czech Albums (IFPI)	10
Danish Albums (Hitlisten)	3
Dutch Albums (Album Top 100)	2
European Albums (Music & Media)	1
Finnish Albums (Suomen virallinen lista)	16
French Albums (SNEP)	21
German Albums (Offizielle Top 100)	1
Greek Albums (IFPI)	1
Hungarian Albums (MAHASZ)	2
Icelandic Albums (Tónlist)	1
Irish Albums (IRMA)	1
Italian Albums (FIMI)	5
Italian Albums (Musica e dischi)	5
New Zealand Albums (RMNZ)	1
Norwegian Albums (VG-lista)	1
Polish Albums (ZPAV)	2
Singaporean Albums (RIAS)	5
Spanish Albums (PROMUSICAE)	14
Swedish Albums (Sverigetopplistan)	4
Swiss Albums (Schweizer Hitparade)	1
UK Albums (Official Charts)	1

=== Year-end charts ===
Chart (2001)	Position
Australian Albums (ARIA)	63
Austrian Albums (Ö3 Austria)	2
Belgian Albums (Ultratop Flanders)	46
Belgian Albums (Ultratop Wallonia)	50
Dutch Albums (Album Top 100)	19
French Albums (SNEP)	114
German Albums (Offizielle Top 100)	17
Irish Albums (IRMA)	1
Italian Albums (FIMI)	32
Swedish Albums (Sverigetopplistan)	87
Swiss Albums (Schweizer Hitparade)	21
UK Albums (OCC)	2
Worldwide Albums (IFPI)	14

Chart (2002)	Position
Australian Albums (ARIA)	18
Austrian Albums (Ö3 Austria)	1
Belgian Albums (Ultratop Flanders)	46
Belgian Albums (Ultratop Wallonia)	84
Dutch Albums (Album Top 100)	5
European Albums (Music & Media)	5
French Albums (SNEP)	99
German Albums (Offizielle Top 100)	5
New Zealand Albums (RMNZ)	38
Swedish Albums (Sverigetopplistan)	40
Swiss Albums (Schweizer Hitparade)	8
UK Albums (OCC)	35

Chart (2003)	Position
Dutch Albums (Album Top 100)	35
German Albums (Offizielle Top 100)	56
UK Albums (OCC)	167

=== Decade-end charts ===
Chart (2000–2009)	Position
Australian Albums (ARIA)	58
UK Albums (OCC)	17

== Certifications and sales ==
Region	Certification	Certified units/sales
Argentina (CAPIF)	3× Platinum	120,000^{^}
Australia (ARIA)	4× Platinum	280,000^{^}
Austria (IFPI Austria)	4× Platinum	160,000^{*}
Belgium (BRMA)	Gold	25,000^{*}
Canada (Music Canada)	Gold	50,000^{^}
Denmark (IFPI Danmark)	Platinum	50,000^{^}
France (SNEP)	Gold	100,000^{*}
Germany (BVMI)	5× Platinum	1,500,000^{^}
Greece (IFPI Greece)	Gold	15,000^{^}
Hungary (MAHASZ)	Gold	
Netherlands (NVPI)	2× Platinum	160,000^{^}
New Zealand (RMNZ)	5× Platinum	75,000^{^}
Poland (ZPAV)	Gold	50,000^{*}
Spain (Promusicae)	Platinum	100,000^{^}
Sweden (GLF)	Platinum	80,000^{^}
Switzerland (IFPI Switzerland)	3× Platinum	120,000^{^}
United Kingdom (BPI)	8× Platinum	2,430,000
Summaries
Europe (IFPI)	6× Platinum	6,000,000^{*}
^{*} Sales figures based on certification alone.^{^} Shipments figures based on certification alone.

== See also ==
- List of best-selling albums in Germany
- List of best-selling albums of the 2000s (decade) in the United Kingdom
