= Live Twice =

Live Twice may refer to:

- Live Twice (album), a 2004 album by Darius Danesh
- "Live Twice" (song), the title track from the album
