= Time to Think (Sarah Whatmore album) =

Studio album by Sarah Whatmore
- Released: 23 March 2009
- Recorded: 2008
- Genre: Pop
- Label: 19 Recordings

Singles from Time to Think
- 1. "Smile" Released: 22 September 2008; 2. "Undefined" Released: 29 March 2009

Time to Think is the debut album by the British pop singer Sarah Whatmore. It was released in the United Kingdom on 23 March 2009. It features the singles "Smile" (in collaboration with Greg Fitzgerald) and "Undefined".

It was only the first album that Pop Idol participant Sarah Whatmore had released, as the release of her planned debut album in 2003 was cancelled. This was in spite of the success of singles "When I Lost You" and "Automatic", which both reached the top 10 in the UK Singles Chart.

== Production and writing ==
In an interview for Digital Spy, Sarah talked about the recording of her new album and why it had taken her so long to release new material. She said "The album is full of beautiful, classic-sounding songs that won't date because everything on there is quite real." She went on to say "I've been involved in terms of melody, lyrics and creating the sound I wanted for the album, which is lots of piano and real strings." She also told the Daily Mirror that she had written over 200 songs in preparing for the album.

When asked about the reason why her debut album was never released, she said "The album was all finished and ready to go, we'd released the first two singles and we couldn't decide on a third single. Then the song 'Toxic' came through the door and, for like two days, I was going to do it. But then obviously Britney got it and I was like, 'You know what, I want to go and write and see what I come up with myself'." She said that Simon Fuller had remained as her manager since her Pop Idol appearance and was involved in the production of the album. She was also uncertain about whether she would be able to get back into the music industry.

== Track listing ==
All tracks are written by Sarah Whatmore

| No. | Title | Length |
|---|---|---|
| 1. | "Undefined" |
| 2. | "Smile" |
| 3. | "Somewhere I Belong" |
| 4. | "Unsure" |
| 5. | "Permanent Last Resort" |
| 6. | "Time to Think" |
| 7. | "Innocence" |
| 8. | "Empathy" |
| 9. | "Surrender" |
| 10. | "Own Designs" |
