= From Now... =

Studio album by Rik Waller
- Released: 8 July 2002
- Genre: Pop
- Label: Liberty

From Now... is the debut studio album from English singer Rik Waller, a finalist in 2001 of the reality TV series Pop Idol. His album was released in July 2002. It features his first two singles, "I Will Always Love You" and "(Something Inside) So Strong", both of which were UK top 40 hits.

== Track listing ==
1. "Where Did We Go Wrong" - 3:50
2. "(Something Inside) So Strong" - 3:41
3. "I Will Always Love You" - 3:37
4. "Try a Little Tenderness" - 4:06
5. "Don't Look Any Further" - 4:10
6. "One in a Million" - 3:37
7. "I Can't Make You Love Me" - 4:31
8. "All Cried Out" - 3:51
9. "On the Wings of Love" - 3:56
10. "Sacrifice" - 4:41
11. "Criticise" - 3:43
12. "From Now" - 3:39
13. "Just Another Day" - 4:43
14. "Miracle in Me" - 3:28
