= Time to Think =

Time to Think may refer to:

- Time to Think (Mo Foster album), 2002
- Time to Think (The Kingston Trio album), 1963
- Time to Think (Sarah Whatmore album), 2009
- Time to Think (book), a 2023 book by Hannah Barnes
