= Blink (Rosie Ribbons song) =

Single by Rosie Ribbons

from the album Misbehaving
- B-side: "Colours"
- Released: 21 October 2002
- Genre: Pop, hip hop
- Length: 3:09 (radio edit)
- Label: T2
- Producer(s): Mark Lister

Rosie Ribbons singles chronology
"Blink" (2002)	"A Little Bit" (2003)

Blink is a song produced by Mark Lister and released as a single by Pop Idol contestant Rosie Ribbons in 2002. The single peaked at number 12 in the United Kingdom.

== Track listing ==
1. "Blink" (radio edit) - 3:09
2. "Blink" (Rishi Rich "Urban Rose" remix) - 4:10
3. "Colours" - 4:05
4. "Blink" (music video)

== Charts ==
Chart (2002)	Peak position
UK Singles Chart	12
