= Pop Idol: The Big Band Album =

Compilation album by various artists
- Released: 2002
- Recorded: 2002
- Genre: Big band
- Label: Sony BMG
- Producer: Stephen Lipson

Pop Idol chronology
Pop Idol: The Big Band Album (2002)	Pop Idol - the Idols: Xmas Factor (2003)

Pop Idol: The Big Band Album is a compilation album featuring big band songs recorded by the final 10 from the first UK series of Pop Idol.

== Development ==
The album was inspired by Robbie William's big band album Swing When You're Winning. Zoe commented "we've all listened to it and it's really brilliant music". In regard to having the chance to create an album in the same genre, she added "it's fantastic to be able to get in front of a live band and have them behind you while you're singing!". The album saw 10 finalists singing big and songs "accompanied by the full big band orchestra, 'The Big Blue'."

== Track listing ==
1. "Beyond the Sea" (Jack Lawrence, Charles Trenet) — featuring Will Young
2. "Get Happy" (Harold Arlen, Ted Koehler) — featuring Zoe Birkett
3. "Let There Be Love" (Lionel Rand, Ian Grant) — featuring Darius Danesh
4. "Mack the Knife" (Bertolt Brecht, Marc Blitzstein, Kurt Weill) — featuring Gareth Gates
5. "Ev'ry Time We Say Goodbye" (Cole Porter) — featuring Jessica Garlick
6. "I Get a Kick Out of You" (Porter) — featuring Aaron Bayley
7. "I've Got You Under My Skin" (Porter) — featuring Zoe Birkett
8. "That Ole Devil Called Love" (Allan Roberts, Doris Fisher) — featuring Hayley Evetts
9. "I Won't Dance" (Jerome Kern, Oscar Hammerstein II, Otto Harbach, Dorothy Fields, Jimmy McHugh) — featuring Will Young
10. "Night and Day" (Porter) — featuring Korben
11. "Cheek to Cheek" (Irving Berlin) — featuring Rosie Ribbons
12. "They Can't Take That Away from Me" (George Gershwin, Ira Gershwin) — featuring Laura Doherty
13. "Oh! Look at Me Now" (Joe Bushkin, John Deviers) — featuring Gareth Gates and Zoe Birkett

== Critical reception ==
The album received negative reviews, with many blaming the unsuccessful experiment on the recent big band Robbie Williams album Swing When You're Winning that reinvigorated the genre.

NME gave the album a rating of 3/10, commenting "Anyone whose idea of a treat isn't a tin of Quality Street, however, knows exactly what they should do to this low swing. " Entertainment.ie said "Blame Robbie Williams for starting the craze, if you like - but at least Sing When You're Winning had a certain amount of gaudy style. This is just plain cheap." The Guardian concluded "One goodish track out of a dozen, then. Annoy Simon Cowell - boycott this nasty little cash-in." In an unusually positive review, UKMix gave it 4/5 stars, " On the whole, this is a very good album and will make a nice change to your CD collection. I would recommend it to anyone who isn't a total rock snob!".
