= Let There Be Love (1940 song) =

Song
- Language: English
- Published: 1940
- Composer(s): Lionel Rand
- Lyricist(s): Ian Grant

"Let There Be Love" is a popular song with music by Lionel Rand and lyrics by Ian Grant, published in 1940.

Lyrically, the song talks about the joy of the existence of, in order: the singer and his beloved, oysters under the sea, occasional weather changes ("let there be wind / occasional rain"), chili con carne, champagne, birds that sing, friends ("someone to bless me whenever I sneeze"), birds of various kinds ("cuckoos, a lark and a dove"), but that all of these would mean nothing if love were not put first ("but first of all - please / Let there be love").

The song is a well-known standard with cover versions by many artists, notably Nat King Cole.

== Recorded versions ==
- Abe Lyman and his Californians (recorded April 17, 1940, released by Bluebird Records as catalog number 10685, with the flip side "Then I'll Be Happy")
- Al Donahue and his Orchestra (recorded March 18, 1940, released by Vocalion Records as catalog number 5454, also released by Conqueror Records as catalog number 9453, both with the flip side "Imagination")
- Chris Botti
- Cilla Black (on her album Beginnings: Revisited)
- Cliff Richard and Matt Monro (duet on the 2006 album Two's Company)
- Darius Campbell on the album Pop Idol: The Big Band Album
- Dee Bell
- Diana Dors (recorded 1960, album "Swingin' Dors")
- Doris Rhodes with Joe Sullivan (recorded March 26, 1940, released by Columbia Records as catalog number 35449, with the flip side "Sierra Sue")
- Gerry Mulligan Quartet
- Harry James on the album Harry James and His New Jazz Band, Vol. 2 (Mr. Music MMCD 7012, 1956 [2002])
- Henry King and his orchestra (vocal: Tony Russell) (recorded March 15, 1940, released by Decca Records as catalog number 3083B, with the flip side "Irene")
- Jaye P. Morgan
- Jesse Belvin
- Jimmy Dorsey and his orchestra (recorded April 18, 1940, released by Decca Records as catalog number 3166A, with the flip side "Poor Ballerina")
- Jive Bunny and the Mastermixers
- Joe Dolan
- John Pizzarelli
- Joni James (released by MGM Records as catalog number 11223, with the flip side "My Baby Just Cares for Me", also as catalog number 30826, with the flip side "The Nearness of You")
- Julie London
- June Christy – A Lovely Way To Spend An Evening (1986)
- Kay Kyser and his orchestra (vocal: Harry Babbitt) (recorded March 21, 1940, released by Columbia Records as catalog number 35439, with the flip side "Fools Rush In")
- Laura Fygi (recorded 1993, album "Bewitched")
- Leslie Hutchinson
- Matt Monro on his album The Other Side Of The Stars 1975 (Columbia SCX 6578 UK)
- Michael Bublé (in a duet with Chris Botti, To Love Again: The Duets (2005)
- Miss Piggy and Bruce Forsyth sing it as the closing number on episode 1.13 (4 December 1976) of The Muppet Show.
- Nat King Cole (1962, a hit single in Britain)
- Natalie Cole
- Oscar Peterson
- Pearl Bailey
- Rosemary Clooney (1992, on her album Girl Singer)
- Sammy Davis Jr.
- Sammy Kaye orchestra (recorded March 20, 1940, released by Victor Records as catalog number 26564, with the flip side "Peasant Serenade")
- Shirley Bassey – Shirley (1961)
- Silje Nergaard
- Stan Kenton
- Teddy Grace (recorded May 28, 1940, released by Decca Records as catalog number 3202A, with the flip side "Left All Alone with the Blues")
- Tony Bennett recorded a version on his 1957 album The Beat of My Heart.
- Van Alexander and his orchestra (recorded May 29, 1939, released by Bluebird Records as catalog number 10297, with the flip side "In the Middle of a Dream")
- Westlife
