= Colourblind (Darius Campbell song) =

1999 single by Darius

Single by Darius

from the album Dive In
- B-side: "Chrysalis to Butterfly"; "It's Not Unusual" (live)
- Released: 24 September 1999
- Studio: Atomic
- Length: 3:35
- Label: Mercury
- Songwriters: Darius; Pete Glenister; Deni Lew
- Producers: Pete Glenister; Deni Lew

Darius singles chronology
"Colourblind" (1999)	"Rushes" (1999)

"Colourblind" is a song by Scottish singer-songwriter Darius, who finished third on the first series of Pop Idol in 2002. His debut single, it was released as the lead single from his first solo album, Dive In (2002).

== Song history ==
After turning down an offer of a multimillion-dollar record deal by Pop Idol judge Simon Cowell to sign with his record label, Darius began work on his solo album on which "Colourblind" would be included.

Darius had been working on the song pre-Pop Idol and was originally ignored by Cowell, but after meeting with Pete Glenister and Deni Lew as well as Steve Lillywhite, the song began to be considered as a possible single.

== Release ==
"Colourblind" was released on 29 July 2002 and reached number one in the UK Singles Chart for two weeks. It also peaked at number 13 on the Irish Singles Chart. Following Darius's death on 11 August 2022, the song debuted at number two on both the UK Official Single Download and Official Single Sales Charts on 19 August 2022.

== Music video ==
The video for the single was shot over four days in Sierra Nevada, Spain. It follows Darius as he is thrown out of a car in the middle of the countryside. He changes his outfit from a black suit to jeans, to signify he is leaving his Pop Idol image behind.

He meets a girl whose car has stalled, played by model Jacqui Ainsley. After the two meet, a romance ensues, whilst also cutting away to a close up of Darius singing the track as well as playing his guitar. Ainsley later became Darius' girlfriend in real-life, although the couple broke up in 2004.

== Track listings ==
UK CD1

1. "Colourblind"
2. "It's Not Unusual" (live)
3. "Colourblind" (acoustic)
4. "Colourblind" (video)

UK CD2

1. "Colourblind"
2. "Chrysalis to Butterfly"
3. Video interview

UK cassette single

1. "Colourblind"
2. "It's Not Unusual" (live)
3. "Chrysalis to Butterfly"

European and Australasian CD single

1. "Colourblind"
2. "Chrysalis to Butterfly"
3. "Colourblind" (Almighty mix)
4. "Colourblind" (8 Jam remix)
5. "Colourblind" (video)

== Charts ==
=== Weekly charts ===
Chart (2002–2003)	Peak position
Australia (ARIA)	61
Europe (Eurochart Hot 100)	9
Ireland (IRMA)	13
Netherlands (Single Top 100)	75
Scottish Singles Sales (Official Charts)	1
UK Singles (Official Charts)	1

Chart (2022)	Peak position
UK Singles Downloads (Official Charts)	2
UK Singles Sales (Official Charts)	2

=== Year-end charts ===
Chart (2002)	Position
Ireland (IRMA)	100
UK Singles (OCC)	18
UK Airplay (Music Week)	36

== Certifications ==
Region	Certification	Certified units/sales
United Kingdom (BPI)	Gold	400,000^{‡}
^{‡} Sales+streaming figures based on certification alone.

== Release history ==
Region	Date	Format(s)	Label(s)	Ref.
United Kingdom	29 July 2002	CD; cassette	Mercury	
Australia	17 February 2003	CD	Mercury	
