= Pop Idol series 1 =

Pop Idol
- Series 1
- Hosted by: Ant & Dec (ITV); Kate Thornton (ITV2)
- Judges: Simon Cowell; Neil Fox; Nicki Chapman; Pete Waterman
- Winner: Will Young
- Runner-up: Gareth Gates

Release
- Original network: ITV; ITV2 (Pop Idol Extra)
- Original release: 6 October 2001 – 9 February 2002

Series chronology
- Next → Series 2

The first series of British reality television show Pop Idol was broadcast on ITV in the United Kingdom during the winter months of 2001 and 2002. The show was a singing competition open to people aged between 16 and 26 years old, with the winner receiving a £1 million recording contract to release their debut album. Pop Idol received ratings of as high as 10 million viewers for shows before the live final. The footage of the programme's opening titles, as well as the live final of this series, was used in the first season of American Idol, which began over four months after the airing of the live final, in which Kelly Clarkson won the season.

Auditions were held during the early months and summer of 2001 in various locations across the United Kingdom. Selected acts were broadcast on a series of audition programmes in October 2001. The first live show was broadcast on 15 December 2001 and the live final was held on 9 February 2002. The competition was won by Will Young, with Gareth Gates finishing as the runner-up after a public vote. Both of the finalists went on to have chart successes with both their debut releases and subsequent material. Third-placed Darius Danesh also gained a record deal and achieved a string of top-40 hits in the United Kingdom, including a number-one single.

The live shows were broadcast in two parts on Saturday evenings. Each of the contestants sang in an early show at around 19:00 GMT and the results were given in a show broadcast later in the evening.

== Judges and Presenters ==
The show had four judges, Simon Cowell, Pete Waterman, Nicki Chapman and Neil Fox, who gave comments on both the auditions and live performances of the singers. Chapman had also been a judge on the first series of Popstars, a previous ITV talent show with a similar format. Waterman was later a judge on Popstars: The Rivals, the second and final series of Popstars.

Presenting duo Ant & Dec hosted the main shows on ITV, with Kate Thornton presenting the spin-off programme Pop Idol Extra on ITV2.

Judges and Presenter(s) for Pop Idol Series 1

Simon Cowell

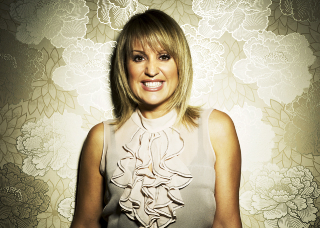
Nicki Chapman

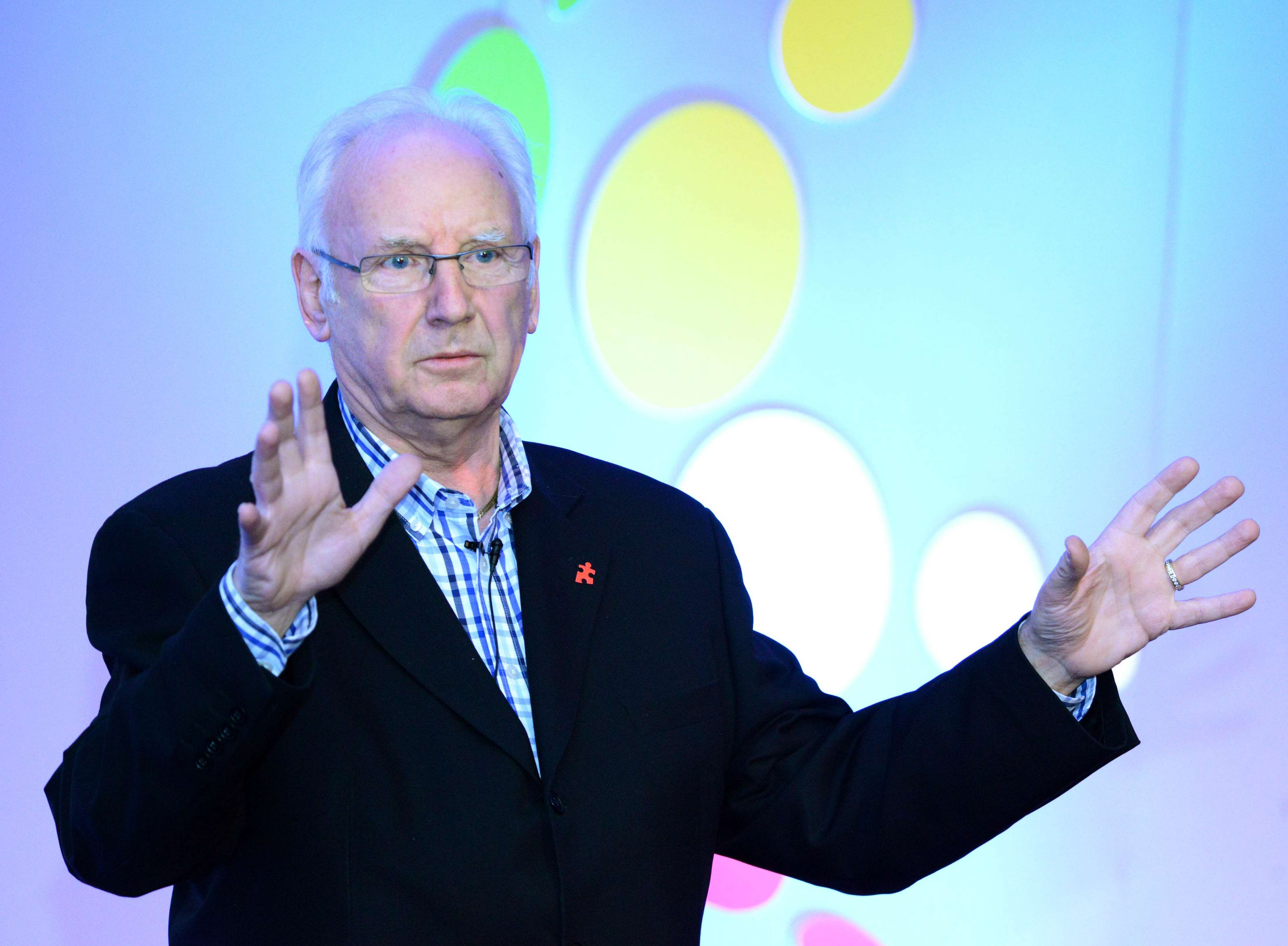
Pete Waterman

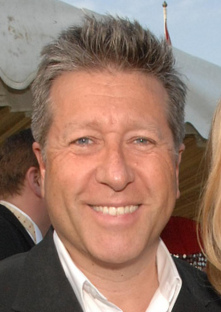
Neil Fox

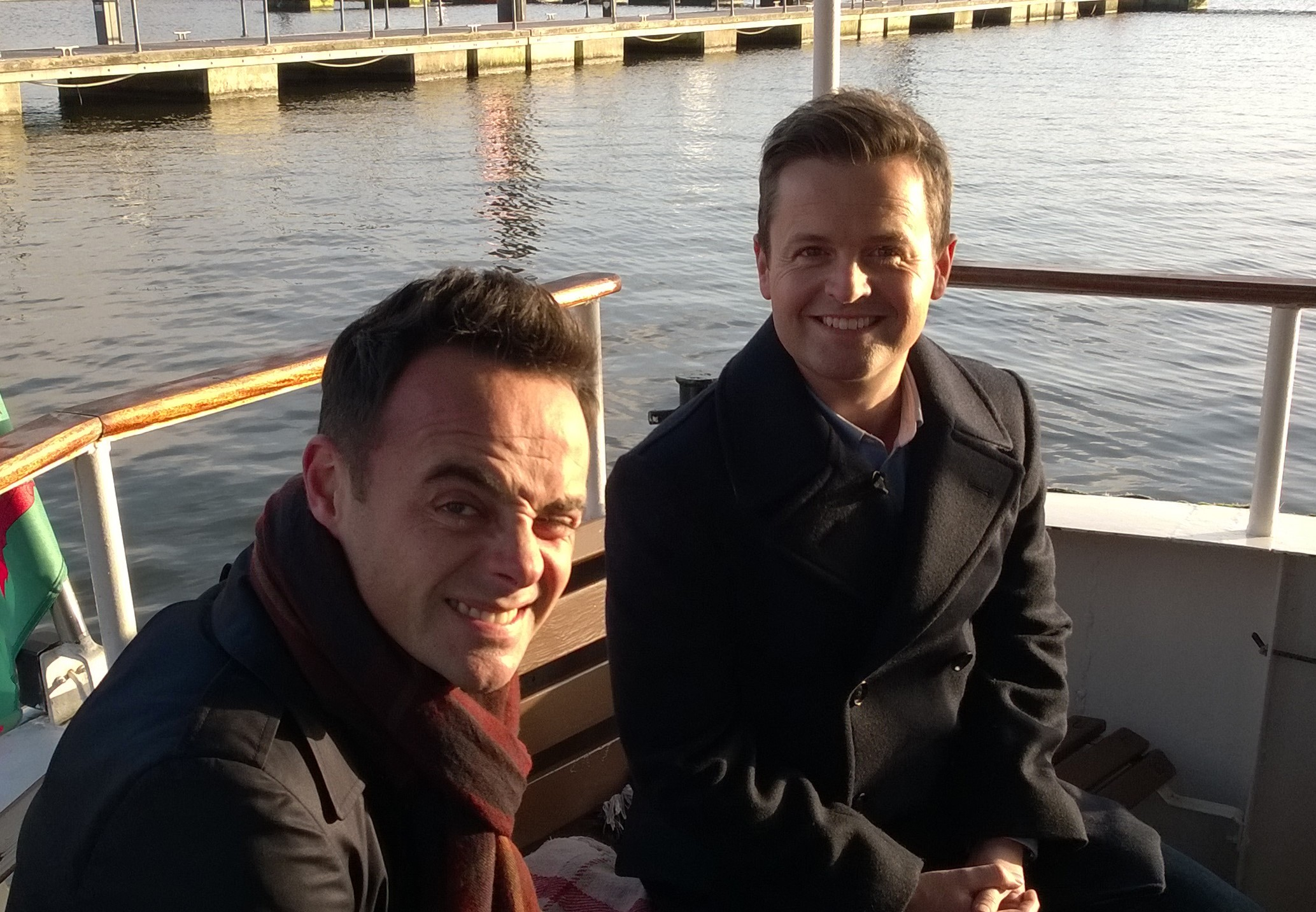
Ant & Dec (ITV1)

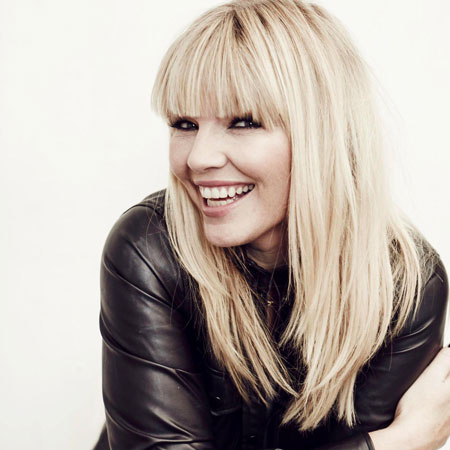
Kate Thornton (ITV2)

== Finals ==
=== Finalists ===
| Finalist | Age * | From | Status |
|---|---|---|---|
| Korben | 21 | London | Eliminated 1st in Week 1 |
| Rik Waller | 22 | Gillingham | Withdrew in Week 2 |
| Jessica Garlick | 20 | Kidwelly | Eliminated 2nd in Week 2 |
| Aaron Bayley | 26 | Newcastle | Eliminated 3rd in Week 3 |
| Laura Doherty | 19 | Derry | Eliminated 4th in Week 4 |
| Rosie Ribbons | 18 | Alltwen | Eliminated 5th in Week 5 |
| Hayley Evetts | 25 | Birmingham | Eliminated 6th in Week 6 |
| Zoe Birkett | 16 | County Durham | Eliminated 7th in Week 7 |
| Darius Danesh | 21 | Glasgow | Eliminated 8th in Week 8 |
| Gareth Gates | 17 | Bradford | Runner-up |
| Will Young | 22 | Wokingham | Winner |

* as of the start of the series

== Heats and live shows ==
The heats began airing on 3 November 2001, and consisted of five heats of ten singers. The performance shows were prerecorded on the previous Wednesday, and were shown on the Saturday, with the live results shows following after. Contestants dressed the same to create the illusion that the earlier performances were live. The two contestants from each heat with the most votes progressed to the top 10, where all shows were live. The live shows began on 15 December 2001, and continued through to the live final on 9 February 2002.

=== Results summary ===
Colour key

| – | Contestant was in the bottom two |
| – | Contestant was in the bottom three |
| – | Contestant received the fewest public votes and was eliminated |
| – | Contestant received the most public votes (weeks 1-8) |
| – | Contestant won the competition |

| Stage: | | Heats | | | | | Live shows | | | | | | | | |
| Week: | | 3/11 | 10/11 | 17/11 | 24/11 | 1/12 | 15/12 | 22/12 | 29/12 | 5/1 | 12/1 | 19/1 | 26/1 | 2/2 | 9/2 |
| Place | Contestant | 3/11 | 10/11 | 17/11 | 24/11 | 1/12 | 15/12 | 22/12 | 29/12 | 5/1 | 12/1 | 19/1 | 26/1 | 2/2 | 9/2 |
| 1 | Will Young | | | | 1st 41.5% | | 1st 27.3% | 1st 22.6% | 1st 21.3% | 1st 29.8% | 2nd 25.2% | 2nd 24.0% | 2nd 27.9% | 1st 39.8% | Winner; 53.1% |
| 2 | Gareth Gates | 1st 62.0% | | | | | 2nd 26.3% | 2nd 20.8% | 2nd 21.0% | 2nd 23.3% | 1st 36.6% | 1st 25.4% | 1st 28.7% | 2nd 39.3% | Runner-up; 46.9% |
| 3 | Darius Danesh | | | | | 3rd 19.9% | N/A | 3rd 19.0% | 3rd 18.2% | 3rd 18.0% | 4th 13.3% | 3rd 23.7% | 3rd 24.5% | 3rd 20.9% | Eliminated (Week 8) |
| 4 | Zoe Birkett | 2nd 10.0% | | | | | 3rd 10.8% | 4th 14.2% | 4th 11.4% | 5th 7.8% | 3rd 14.0% | 4th 15.6% | 4th 18.9% | Eliminated (Week 7) | |
| 5 | Hayley Evetts | | 1st 33.2% | | | | 6th 6.8% | 5th 5.1% | 5th 8.4% | 4th 10.8% | 5th 5.8% | 5th 11.3% | Eliminated (Week 6) | | |
| 6 | Rosie Ribbons | | | 1st 51.2% | | | 4th 10.5% | 7th 4.8% | 7th 6.9% | 6th 5.5% | 6th 5.1% | Eliminated (Week 5) | | | |
| 7 | Laura Doherty | | 2nd 30.8% | | | | 8th 4.3% | 8th 4.3% | 6th 7.1% | 7th 4.8% | Eliminated (Week 4) | | | | |
| 8 | Aaron Bayley | | | | | 2nd 24.9% | 5th 6.8% | 6th 5.4% | 8th 5.7% | Eliminated (Week 3) | | | | | |
| 9 | Jessica Garlick | | | 2nd 12.4% | | | 7th 4.6% | 9th 3.8% | Eliminated (Week 2) | | | | | | |
| 10 | Rik Waller | | | | | 1st 25.6% | N/A | Quit | Withdrew (week 2) | | | | | | |
| 11 | Korben | | | | 2nd 24.7% | | 9th 2.6% | Eliminated (Week 1) | | | | | | | |
| Heat 5 | Sarah Whatmore | | | | | 4th 19.8% | Eliminated (Heat 5) | | | | | | | | |
| Heat 5 | Vanessa Cavanagh | | | | | 5th 3.5% | Eliminated (Heat 5) | | | | | | | | |
| Heat 5 | Jade Cannell | | | | | Eliminated | Eliminated (Heat 5) | | | | | | | | |
| Heat 5 | Rachel Makins | | | | | Eliminated | Eliminated (Heat 5) | | | | | | | | |
| Heat 5 | Davina Perera | | | | | Eliminated | Eliminated (Heat 5) | | | | | | | | |
| Heat 5 | Joanne Slattery | | | | | Eliminated | Eliminated (Heat 5) | | | | | | | | |
| Heat 5 | Hayley Bamford | | | | | Eliminated | Eliminated (Heat 5) | | | | | | | | |
| Heat 4 | Natalie Anderson | | | | 3rd 12.6% | Eliminated (Heat 4) | | | | | | | | | |
| Heat 4 | Tania Elise Foster | | | | 4th 5.9% | Eliminated (Heat 4) | | | | | | | | | |
| Heat 4 | Rebecca Govan | | | | 5th 3.9% | Eliminated (Heat 4) | | | | | | | | | |
| Heat 4 | Sally Goodison | | | | Eliminated | Eliminated (Heat 4) | | | | | | | | | |
| Heat 4 | Zoey Callandria Jones | | | | Eliminated | Eliminated (Heat 4) | | | | | | | | | |
| Heat 4 | Lucinda O'Connel | | | | Eliminated | Eliminated (Heat 4) | | | | | | | | | |
| Heat 4 | Scott Sadari | | | | Eliminated | Eliminated (Heat 4) | | | | | | | | | |
| Heat 4 | Craig Thomas | | | | Eliminated | Eliminated (Heat 4) | | | | | | | | | |
| Heat 3 | Oliver Manson | | | 3rd 8.8% | Eliminated (Heat 3) | | | | | | | | | | |
| Heat 3 | Sandi McCash | | | 4th 8.5% | Eliminated (Heat 3) | | | | | | | | | | |
| Heat 3 | Christopher Mason | | | 5th 8.3% | Eliminated (Heat 3) | | | | | | | | | | |
| Heat 3 | Suraya Klein-Smith | | | Eliminated | Eliminated (Heat 3) | | | | | | | | | | |
| Heat 3 | Anthony Batey | | | Eliminated | Eliminated (Heat 3) | | | | | | | | | | |
| Heat 3 | Helen Farrar | | | Eliminated | Eliminated (Heat 3) | | | | | | | | | | |
| Heat 3 | Andrew Derbyshire | | | Eliminated | Eliminated (Heat 3) | | | | | | | | | | |
| Heat 3 | Carla Winters | | | Eliminated | Eliminated (Heat 3) | | | | | | | | | | |
| Heat 2 | David Wilson | | 3rd 11.5% | Eliminated (Heat 2) | | | | | | | | | | | |
| Heat 2 | Katie Neiman | | 4th 8.3% | Eliminated (Heat 2) | | | | | | | | | | | |
| Heat 2 | Nicola Thomas | | 5th 7.6% | Eliminated (Heat 2) | | | | | | | | | | | |
| Heat 2 | Nikk Mager | | Eliminated | Eliminated (Heat 2) | | | | | | | | | | | |
| Heat 2 | Jonathan Campbel | | Eliminated | Eliminated (Heat 2) | | | | | | | | | | | |
| Heat 2 | Kerry Pitt | | Eliminated | Eliminated (Heat 2) | | | | | | | | | | | |
| Heat 2 | Chris Gazzard | | Eliminated | Eliminated (Heat 2) | | | | | | | | | | | |
| Heat 2 | Joanne Birchall | | Eliminated | Eliminated (Heat 2) | | | | | | | | | | | |
| Heat 1 | Haifa Kayali | 3rd 9.0% | Eliminated (Heat 1) | | | | | | | | | | | | |
| Heat 1 | Christopher Tame | 4th 7.0% | Eliminated (Heat 1) | | | | | | | | | | | | |
| Heat 1 | Juliana Hoy | 5th 6.0% | Eliminated (Heat 1) | | | | | | | | | | | | |
| Heat 1 | Paula-Jade Cremin | Eliminated | Eliminated (Heat 1) | | | | | | | | | | | | |
| Heat 1 | Andy Love | Eliminated | Eliminated (Heat 1) | | | | | | | | | | | | |
| Heat 1 | Laverne Scott-Roberts | Eliminated | Eliminated (Heat 1) | | | | | | | | | | | | |
| Heat 1 | Jayne Stala | Eliminated | Eliminated (Heat 1) | | | | | | | | | | | | |
| Heat 1 | Ian Johnstone | Eliminated | Eliminated (Heat 1) | | | | | | | | | | | | |

- Darius Danesh was originally eliminated on 8 December results show, placing third in his heat. However, he returned to the show when Rik Waller, who had won the heat, was forced to pull out of the competition due to illness. Danesh started competing from the show of 22 December.

=== Live show details ===
==== Heat 1 (3 November 2001 - recorded on 31 October 2001) ====
Contestants' performances on the first live heat
| Act | Order | From | Song | Result |
|---|---|---|---|---|
| Laverne Scott-Roberts | 1 | Winsford | "Can't Fight the Moonlight" (LeAnn Rimes) | Eliminated |
| Zoe Birkett | 2 | Darlington | "One Moment in Time" (Whitney Houston) | Advanced – (2nd place) |
| Errol Edwards | 3 | Basford | "Another Day in Paradise" (Phil Collins) | Eliminated |
| Juliana Hoy | 4 | Renfrew | "One for Sorrow" (Steps) | Eliminated – (5th place) |
| Paula-Jade Cremin | 5 | Cricklewood | "The Greatest Love of All" (George Benson) | Eliminated |
| Christopher Tame | 6 | Thirsk | "All or Nothing" (O-Town) | Eliminated – (4th place) |
| Jayne Stala | 7 | Nottingham | "Isn't She Lovely" (Stevie Wonder) | Eliminated |
| Gareth Gates | 8 | Bradford | "Flying Without Wings" (Westlife) | Advanced – (1st place) |
| Haifa Kayali | 9 | Chigwell | "Unbreak My Heart" (Toni Braxton) | Eliminated – (3rd place) |
| Andy Love | 10 | Berkhamsted | "Man in the Mirror" (Michael Jackson) | Eliminated |

Notes

- The five contestants who received the highest number of votes were revealed in reverse order. Gareth Gates and Zoe Birkett advanced to the top 10 of the competition and the other eight contestants were eliminated.
- Haifa Kayali later auditioned for the second series of The X Factor where she again narrowly missed out on the live shows, after being eliminated in the judges' houses round.
- Laverne Scott-Roberts appeared on The Voice UK in 2014 and her performance made all four mentors want to work with her. She chose to join Tom Jones' team.

==== Heat 2 (10 November 2001 - Recorded on 7 November 2001) ====
Contestants' performances on the second live heat
| Act | Order | From | Song | Result |
|---|---|---|---|---|
| Joanne Birchall | 1 | Liverpool | "Chain Reaction" (Diana Ross) | Eliminated |
| Hayley Evetts | 2 | Birmingham | "I Have Nothing" (Whitney Houston) | Advanced – (1st place) |
| Chris Gazzard | 3 | Bromley | "Lately" (Stevie Wonder) | Eliminated |
| Kerry Pitt | 4 | Hemel Hempstead | "Touch Me in the Morning" (Diana Ross) | Eliminated |
| Jonathan Campbell | 5 | Cumbernauld | "Deeper Shade of Blue" (Steps) | Eliminated |
| Nikk Mager | 6 | Halifax | "When You Say Nothing at All" (Ronan Keating) | Eliminated |
| Laura Doherty | 7 | Derry | "Tears in Heaven" (Eric Clapton) | Advanced – (2nd place) |
| Katie Neiman | 8 | Hove | "From This Moment On" (Shania Twain) | Eliminated – (4th place) |
| David Wilson | 9 | Gateshead | "Love Is All Around" (The Troggs) | Eliminated – (3rd place) |
| Nicola Thomas | 10 | East Finchley | "Finally" (CeCe Peniston) | Eliminated – (5th place) |

Notes;

- The hosts revealed the five contestants who received the highest number of votes in reverse order. Hayley Evetts and Laura Doherty advanced to the top 10 of the competition. The other 8 contestants were eliminated.
- Nikk was later a finalist on Popstars: The Rivals, but failed to win a place in One True Voice and instead joined the boy band Phixx, who disbanded after one album. He later auditioned for the fifth series of The X Factor in 2008, but the judges didn't put him through.

==== Heat 3 (17 November 2001 - Recorded on 14 November 2001) ====
Contestants' performances on the third live heat
| Act | Order | From | Song | Result |
|---|---|---|---|---|
| Jessica Garlick | 1 | Kidwelly | "Crazy for You" (Madonna) | Advanced – (2nd place) |
| Andrew Derbyshire | 2 | Burnley | "Wind Beneath My Wings" (Bette Midler) | Eliminated |
| Suraya Klein-Smith | 3 | Bethnal Green | "I Don't Want to Miss a Thing" (Aerosmith) | Eliminated |
| Oliver Manson | 4 | Harrow | "I Swear" (All-4-One) | Eliminated – (3rd place) |
| Carla Winters | 5 | Croydon | "Get Here" (Oleta Adams) | Eliminated |
| Sandi McCash | 6 | Dundee | "Perfect" (Fairground Attraction) | Eliminated – (4th place) |
| Anthony Batey | 7 | Rugeley | "Against All Odds" (Phil Collins) | Eliminated |
| Helen Farrar | 8 | Luton | "Say a Little Prayer (Dionne Warwick) | Eliminated |
| Christopher Mason | 9 | Solihull | "Don't Let the Sun Go Down on Me" (Elton John) | Eliminated – (5th place) |
| Rosie Ribbons | 10 | Alltwen | "(Everything I Do) I Do It for You" (Bryan Adams) | Advanced – (1st place) |

Notes;

- The five contestants who received the highest number of votes were revealed in reverse order. Rosie Ribbons and Jessica Garlick advanced to the top 10 of the competition. The other eight contestants were eliminated
- All four judges predicted that Andrew Derbyshire would progress, but he failed to make the top five in the public vote. He later auditioned for Simon again during Britain's Got Talent.

==== Heat 4 (24 November 2001 - Recorded on 21 November 2001) ====
Contestants' performances on the fourth live heat
| Act | Order | From | Song | Result |
|---|---|---|---|---|
| Lucinda O'Connell | 1 | Nottinghamshire | "How Do I Live" (LeAnn Rimes) | Eliminated |
| Craig Thomas | 2 | Cardiff | "I Believe I Can Fly" (R.Kelly) | Eliminated |
| Sally Goodison | 3 | Barnsley | "Sisters Are Doin' It for Themselves" (Eurythmics) | Eliminated |
| Scott Sadari | 4 | London | "You've Got a Friend" (Carole King) | Eliminated |
| Natalie Anderson | 5 | West Yorkshire | "Hero" (Mariah Carey) | Eliminated – (3rd place) |
| Zoey Callandria Jones | 6 | Lancaster | "Think Twice" (Celine Dion) | Eliminated |
| Korben | 7 | Bedford | "From the Heart" (Another Level) | Advanced – (2nd place) |
| Tania Elise Foster | 8 | Brixton | "Killing Me Softly" (The Fugees) | Eliminated – (4th place) |
| Rebecca Govan | 9 | Manchester | "Out of Reach" (Gabrielle) | Eliminated – (5th place) |
| Will Young | 10 | Wokingham | "Light My Fire" (The Doors) | Advanced – (1st place) |

Notes

- The five contestants who received the highest number of votes were revealed in reverse order. Will Young and Korben advanced to the top 10 of the competition. The other eight contestants were eliminated.
- Natalie Anderson was eliminated, but later found fame when she appeared in the West End production of Wicked and several television shows, including a lengthy stint in The Royal and Holby City. She currently appears in ITV soap opera Emmerdale, playing the part of Alicia Metcalfe.

==== Heat 5 (1 December 2001 - Recorded on 28 November 2001) ====
Contestants' performances on the fifth live heat
| Act | Order | From | Song | Result |
|---|---|---|---|---|
| Davina Perera | 1 | Kent | "Total Eclipse of the Heart" (Bonnie Tyler) | Eliminated |
| Rachel Makins | 2 | Melton Mowbray | "Torn" (Ednaswap) | Eliminated |
| Vanessa Cavanagh | 3 | Greenford | "End of the Line" (Honeyz) | Eliminated – (5th place) |
| Rik Waller | 4 | Gillingham | "I Can't Make You Love Me" (George Michael) | Advanced – (1st place) |
| Joanne Slattery | 5 | Southport | "Relight My Fire" (Dan Hartman) | Eliminated |
| Hayley Bamford | 6 | Yorkshire | "Saving All My Love for You" (Whitney Houston) | Eliminated |
| Darius Danesh | 7 | Glasgow | "(Something Inside) So Strong" (Labi Siffre) | Eliminated – (3rd place) |
| Sarah Whatmore | 8 | Salford | "Endless Love" (Diana Ross) | Eliminated – (4th place) |
| Jade Cannell | 9 | Portsmouth | "Where Do Broken Hearts Go" (Whitney Houston) | Eliminated |
| Aaron Bayley | 10 | Newcastle Upon Tyne | "Walking in Memphis" (Marc Cohn) | Advanced – (2nd place) |

Notes

- The five contestants who received the highest number of votes were revealed in reverse order. Rik Waller and Aaron Bayley advanced to the top 10 of the competition. The other eight contestants were eliminated.
- Although originally eliminated, Darius Danesh made a return to the live shows when Rik Waller was forced to pull out due to a throat infection. He earned his reprieve for finishing third in the group.
- Although she failed to make the top 10, Sarah Whatmore was still signed by Simon Cowell. She released two singles which charted in the UK. Cowell later stated in an interview that he introduced the wildcard round in the second series of Pop Idol to avoid prematurely losing talented contestants like Whatmore.
- Hayley Bamford successfully re-auditioned for the second series of Pop Idol in 2003, becoming the only member of this year's heats to again make it to the top 50. However, she was again eliminated at this stage.

==== Live show 1 (15 December 2001) ====
- Theme: Idols
- Best bits song: "I Still Haven't Found What I'm Looking For"

Contestants' performances on the first live show
| Act | Order | Song | Musical Hero | Result |
|---|---|---|---|---|
| Jessica Garlick | 1 | "Papa Don't Preach" (Madonna) | Madonna | Bottom 3 |
| Korben | 2 | "A Different Corner" (George Michael) | George Michael | Eliminated |
| Zoe Birkett | 3 | "I Will Always Love You" (Dolly Parton) | Whitney Houston | Safe |
| Gareth Gates | 4 | "(Everything I Do) I Do It for You" (Bryan Adams) | Bryan Adams | Safe |
| Laura Doherty | 5 | "She's Out of My Life" (Michael Jackson) | Michael Jackson | Bottom 2 |
| Will Young | 6 | "Until You Come Back to Me" (Aretha Franklin) | Aretha Franklin | Safe |
| Hayley Evetts | 7 | "Made for Lovin' You" (Anastacia) | Anastacia | Safe |
| Aaron Bayley | 8 | "Jesus to a Child" (George Michael) | George Michael | Safe |
| Rosie Ribbons | 9 | "Whenever You Call" (Mariah Carey) | Mariah Carey | Safe |

Notes

- Only nine of the singers performed on the night as Rik Waller had a throat infection that prevented him from singing. The producers allowed Waller to sit out the first week and, if he had recovered, let him compete from the second week. A decision was made that if he failed to recover, Darius Danesh (who had missed out on a place in the final 10 in the same heat as Waller) would take his place. Waller visited a doctor in the week following the first show to assess his condition.
- After the series ended, it was revealed that Will Young had the most votes this week, with Gareth Gates polling second and Zoe Birkett third.
- Korben Niblett left the show after receiving the lowest number of votes.

==== Live show 2 (22 December 2001) ====
- Theme: Christmas songs
- Best bits song: "Nothing Lasts Forever"

Contestants' performances on the second live show
| Act | Order | Song | Result |
|---|---|---|---|
| Hayley Evetts | 1 | "Rockin' Around the Christmas Tree" (Brenda Lee) | Safe |
| Gareth Gates | 2 | "Last Christmas" (Wham!) | Safe |
| Jessica Garlick | 3 | "Merry Christmas Everyone" (Shakin' Stevens) | Eliminated |
| Aaron Bayley | 4 | "Blue Christmas" (Elvis Presley) | Safe |
| Rosie Ribbons | 5 | "Santa Baby" (Eartha Kitt) | Bottom 3 |
| Laura Doherty | 6 | "I Wish It Could Be Christmas Every Day" (Wizzard) | Bottom 2 |
| Will Young | 7 | "Winter Wonderland" (Tony Bennett) | Safe |
| Darius Danesh | 8 | "When a Child Is Born" (Johnny Mathis) | Safe |
| Zoe Birkett | 9 | "All I Want for Christmas Is You" (Mariah Carey) | Safe |

Notes;

- Rik Waller pulled out of Pop Idol on the day of the second live show, having waited to make a last-minute decision. Darius Danesh immediately replaced him as one of the nine remaining contestants.
- Jessica Garlick was voted off the show after receiving the lowest number of votes.

==== Live show 3 (29 December 2001) ====
- Theme: Burt Bacharach songs
- Best bits song: "Yellow"

Contestants' performances on the third live show
| Act | Order | Song | Result |
|---|---|---|---|
| Gareth Gates | 1 | "Arthur's Theme" (Christopher Cross) | Safe |
| Zoe Birkett | 2 | "I Say a Little Prayer" (Aretha Franklin) | Safe |
| Aaron Bayley | 3 | "Twenty Four Hours from Tulsa" (Gene Pitney) | Eliminated |
| Laura Doherty | 4 | "(There's) Always Something There to Remind Me" (Lou Johnson) | Bottom 3 |
| Will Young | 5 | "Wives and Lovers" (Jack Jones) | Safe |
| Rosie Ribbons | 6 | "That's What Friends Are For" (Dionne & Friends) | Bottom 2 |
| Darius Danesh | 7 | "What the World Needs Now Is Love" (Jackie DeShannon) | Safe |
| Hayley Evetts | 8 | "Do You Know the Way to San Jose" (Dionne Warwick) | Safe |

Notes

- Aaron Bayley left the show after receiving the lowest number of votes. His exit created controversy as some viewers claimed that they had been unable to register their votes to keep him in the competition.

==== Live show 4 (5 January 2002) ====
Theme: Songs from films

Contestants' performances on the fourth live show
| Act | Order | Song | Film | Result |
|---|---|---|---|---|
| Gareth Gates | 1 | "My Girl" (The Temptations) | My Girl | Safe |
| Rosie Ribbons | 2 | "Your Song" (Elton John) | Moulin Rouge! | Bottom 2 |
| Darius Danesh | 3 | "Baby Can I Hold You" (Tracy Chapman) | Hercules | Safe |
| Hayley Evetts | 4 | "Show Me Heaven" (Maria McKee) | Days of Thunder | Safe |
| Laura Doherty | 5 | "Licence to Kill" (Gladys Knight) | Licence to Kill | Eliminated |
| Will Young | 6 | "Ain't No Sunshine" (Bill Withers) | Notting Hill | Safe |
| Zoe Birkett | 7 | "Street Life" (Randy Crawford) | Sharky's Machine | Safe |

Notes

- Laura Doherty received the fewest votes, and was eliminated from the competition.
- For the first time, only the bottom two were announced, instead of the bottom three.
- Zoe Birkett had been scheduled to sing "The Power of Love" by Jennifer Rush all week, but had to change it at the last minute having found out it had never actually appeared in a film.

==== Live show 5 (12 January 2002) ====
- Theme: Songs by ABBA
- Best bits song: "The Sun Ain't Gonna Shine (Anymore)"

Contestants' performances on the fifth live show
| Act | Order | Song | Result |
|---|---|---|---|
| Hayley Evetts | 1 | "Take a Chance on Me" | Safe |
| Gareth Gates | 2 | "One of Us" | Safe |
| Rosie Ribbons | 3 | "The Winner Takes It All" | Eliminated |
| Will Young | 4 | "The Name of the Game" | Safe |
| Zoe Birkett | 5 | "Thank You for the Music" | Safe |
| Darius Danesh | 6 | "I Have a Dream" | Safe |

Notes

- Rosie Ribbons was eliminated from the show after receiving the fewest public votes.
- For the first time, there was no bottom two or bottom three announced, though it was later revealed that Hayley Evetts was second bottom this week.
- There was a change in the leader of the public vote for the first time this week, with Gareth Gates overtaking Will Young.

==== Live show 6 (19 January 2002) ====
Theme: Big band

Contestants' performances on the sixth live show
| Act | Order | Song | Result |
|---|---|---|---|
| Zoe Birkett | 1 | "Get Happy" (Judy Garland) | Safe |
| Gareth Gates | 2 | "Mack the Knife" (Bobby Darin) | Safe |
| Hayley Evetts | 3 | "That Ole' Devil Called Love" (Alison Moyet) | Eliminated |
| Will Young | 4 | "We Are in Love" (Harry Connick Jr.) | Safe |
| Darius Danesh | 5 | "Let's Face the Music and Dance" (Irving Berlin) | Safe |

Notes

- Hayley Evetts received the fewest votes and was eliminated.
- Simon Cowell and Pete Waterman had a major argument on air, after Waterman objected to Cowell's criticism of Danesh.

==== Live show 7 (26 January 2002) ====
- Theme: Number-one hits
- Best bits song: "Days"

Contestants' performances on the seventh live show
| Act | Order | First song | Second song | Result |
|---|---|---|---|---|
| Gareth Gates | 1 | "Wake Me Up Before You Go-Go" (Wham!) | "Unchained Melody" (Todd Duncan) | Safe |
| Darius Danesh | 2 | "It's Not Unusual" (Tom Jones) | "Whole Again" (Atomic Kitten) | Safe |
| Zoe Birkett | 3 | "I Wanna Dance with Somebody" (Whitney Houston) | "The Power of Love" (Jennifer Rush) | Eliminated |
| Will Young | 4 | "There Must Be an Angel (Playing with My Heart)" (Eurythmics) | "Night Fever" (The Bee Gees) | Safe |

Notes

- Zoe Birkett received the fewest viewer votes, and was eliminated from the competition.
- Contestants performed two songs this week, back-to-back.

==== Live show 8: Semi-final (2 February 2002) ====
Theme: Judges' Choice

Contestants' performances on the eighth live show
| Act | Order | Song | Order | Song | Result |
|---|---|---|---|---|---|
| Darius Danesh | 1 | "Dancing in the Moonlight" (Toploader) | 4 | "Make It Easy on Yourself" (The Walker Brothers) | Eliminated |
| Gareth Gates | 2 | "Yesterday" (The Beatles) | 5 | "Flying Without Wings" (Westlife) | Safe |
| Will Young | 3 | "Beyond the Sea" (Bobby Darin) | 6 | "I Get the Sweetest Feeling" (Jackie Wilson) | Safe |

Notes

- Darius Danesh was eliminated from the competition having received the fewest viewer votes, leaving Gareth Gates and Will Young to compete the final.

==== Live final (9 February 2002) ====
In the week leading to the final performances, finalists Gareth Gates and Will Young both went on individual nationwide publicity campaign tours, visiting radio stations and newspapers and giving performances in a bid to help generate support. Both finalists travelled in their own personal bus.

Contestants' performances on the ninth live show
| Act | Order | Song | Order | Song | Order | Song | Result |
|---|---|---|---|---|---|---|---|
| Will Young | 1 | "Light My Fire" | 3 | "Anything Is Possible" | 5 | "Evergreen" | Winner |
| Gareth Gates | 2 | "Unchained Melody" | 4 | "Anything Is Possible" | 6 | "Evergreen" | Runner-up |

- Will Young won the competition having received 53.1% of the record 8.7 million votes.

== Reception ==
=== Ratings ===
| Episode | Date | Viewers (millions) | Weekly rank |
|---|---|---|---|
| Auditions 1 | 6 October 2001 | 5.24 | 24 |
| Auditions 2 | 7 October 2001 | 5.62 | 19 |
| Auditions 3 | 13 October 2001 | 4.57 | 30 |
| Auditions 4 | 14 October 2001 | 5.45 | 20 |
| Auditions 5 | 20 October 2001 | 5.09 | 30 |
| Theatre rounds 1 | 21 October 2001 | 6.38 | 18 |
| Theatre rounds 2 | 27 October 2001 | 6.14 | 19 |
| Heat 1 | 3 November 2001 | 6.34 | 19 |
| Heat 1 results | 3 November 2001 | Under 5.16 | Outside Top 30 |
| Heat 2 | 10 November 2001 | 7.49 | 18 |
| Heat 2 results | 10 November 2001 | Under 5.15 | Outside Top 30 |
| Heat 3 | 17 November 2001 | 6.40 | 22 |
| Heat 3 results | 17 November 2001 | Under 5.31 | Outside Top 30 |
| Heat 4 | 24 November 2001 | 7.73 | 17 |
| Heat 4 results | 24 November 2001 | Under 5.42 | Outside Top 30 |
| Heat 5 | 1 December 2001 | 7.61 | 18 |
| Heat 5 results | 1 December 2001 | Under 5.4 | Outside Top 30 |
| The Story So Far | 13 December 2001 | Under 5.28 | Outside Top 30 |
| Live show 1 | 15 December 2001 | 7.70 | 18 |
| Live show 1 results | 15 December 2001 | 7.40 | 22 |
| Live show 2 | 22 December 2001 | 7.91 | 11 |
| Live show 2 results | 22 December 2001 | 7.28 | 16 |
| Live show 3 | 29 December 2001 | 7.55 | 15 |
| Live show 3 results | 29 December 2001 | 4.53 | Outside Top 30 |
| Live show 4 | 5 January 2002 | 8.54 | 14 |
| Live show 4 results | 5 January 2002 | Under 4.58 | Outside Top 30 |
| Live show 5 | 12 January 2002 | 8.05 | 11 |
| Live show 5 results | 12 January 2002 | 7.40 | 13 |
| Live show 6 | 19 January 2002 | 9.05 | 12 |
| Live show 6 results | 19 January 2002 | 8.60 | 13 |
| Live show 7 | 26 January 2002 | 10.16 | 11 |
| Live show 7 results | 26 January 2002 | 10.07 | 12 |
| Live show 8 | 2 February 2002 | 10.28 | 9 |
| Live show 8 results | 2 February 2002 | 10.42 | 8 |
| Live final | 9 February 2002 | 13.34 | 2 |
| Live final update | 9 February 2002 | Under 4.82 | Outside Top 30 |
| Live final results | 9 February 2002 | 12.52 | 4 |
| Will Young – Pop Idol | 23 February 2002 | 8.14 | 12 |
| Pop Idol – The Live Concert | 27 April 2002 | 5.56 | 20 |

== Releases ==
- Pop Idol: The Big Band Album
