= Kinda Love =

2004 single by Darius

Single by Darius

from the album Live Twice
- B-side: "Butterfly Spirit"; "Faith in Me"; "Sexy Individual" (demo)
- Released: 18 October 2004
- Length: 3:18
- Label: Mercury
- Songwriters: Kara DioGuardi; Greg Wells; Darius Danesh
- Producer: Stephen Lipson

Darius singles chronology
| "Girl in the Moon" (2003) | "Kinda Love" (2004) | "Live Twice" (2005) |

"Kinda Love" is the first single from Scottish singer Darius's second album, Live Twice (2004). Released on 18 October 2004, the song peaked at number eight on the UK Singles Chart and number two on the Scottish Singles Chart.

== Content ==
Darius has said that "Kinda Love" is about the insecurity you feel when you are in love with someone, and how just a little moment with them makes your day.

== Music video ==
The video for "Kinda Love" was shot in southern Spain near Costa de la Luz. It features Darius and his real-life girlfriend, actress Natasha Henstridge. It is based on a scene from the Jim Carrey and Kate Winslet film, Eternal Sunshine of the Spotless Mind, with a bed featuring in forest and beach scenes. Darius and Henstridge are searching for each other and are shown together in the same scenes but cannot see each other.

== Track listings ==
- UK CD1
1. "Kinda Love"
2. "Butterfly Spirit"
3. "Faith in Me"
- UK CD2
1. "Kinda Love"
2. "Sexy Individual" (songwriting demo)
- UK DVD single
1. "Kinda Love" (video)
2. "Kinda Love" (behind the scenes footage)
3. "She's Coming Home" (audio)

== Chart ==
| Chart (2004) | Peak position |
|---|---|
| Scottish Singles Sales (Official Charts) | 2 |
| UK Singles (Official Charts) | 8 |
