= Automatic (Sarah Whatmore song) =

Single by Sarah Whatmore
- Released: 10 February 2003
- Recorded: 2002
- Genre: Pop
- Length: 3:18
- Label: RCA, 19 Records
- Songwriter(s): Richard Stannard
- Producer(s): Richard Stannard

Sarah Whatmore singles chronology
| "When I Lost You" (2002) | "Automatic" (2003) | "Smile" (2008) |

"Automatic" is the second song released by Pop Idol contestant Sarah Whatmore. The song was originally due to be included on her debut album, however the album was cancelled.

The single was released on 10 February 2003 in the United Kingdom. It peaked at number 11 in the UK Singles Chart in February 2003. It is also included on the compilation CD Hits 55.

== Track listings and formats ==
UK CD single (maxi)

1. "Automatic" (Original Radio Version)
2. "When I Lost You" (Robbie Rivera Vocal Mix)
3. "Automatic" (Stella Browne Vocal Mix)
4. "Automatic" (music video)

== Charts ==
Chart performance for "Automatic"
| Chart (2003) | Peak position |
|---|---|
| Ireland (IRMA) | 20 |
| UK Singles (OCC) | 11 |

== Release history ==
Release history and formats for "Automatic"
| Region | Date | Label | Format |
|---|---|---|---|
| United Kingdom | 10 February 2003 | RCA/19 | CD single/12" vinyl |
