= Rik Waller =

English singer (born 1981)

- Born: 1981 (age 44–45); Gillingham, Kent, England
- Genres: Pop
- Occupation: Musician
- Instrument: Vocals
- Years active: 2001–2007
- Labels: EMI, Red Admiral, Coeur De Lion

Richard "Rik" Waller (born 1981) is an English pop singer. After appearing as a contestant on the TV series Pop Idol, he had two UK top 40 hits with cover versions of "I Will Always Love You" and "(Something Inside) So Strong".

== Career ==
=== Pop Idol ===
Waller was to be a finalist in the first series of the British ITV television series Pop Idol having initially made it into the last ten of the show, but then pulled out due to severe laryngitis, and his place was taken by Darius Danesh.

=== EMI ===
Following the show, Waller signed a recording contract with EMI in a deal worth approximately £400,000. His first single was a cover version of Dolly Parton's song "I Will Always Love You" which made No. 6 on the UK Singles Chart. He followed this up with another top 40 hit, recorded originally by Labi Siffre, "(Something Inside) So Strong". Both of these songs appear on Waller's album From Now....

=== Red Admiral Records ===
When he was dropped by EMI, Waller formed his own band to take his music out on the road. He then signed an album deal with Red Admiral Records. Two months into Waller's Beyond Reality Tour 2004, three concerts were cancelled due to poor ticket sales. Among them was a show at the Princess Theatre in Torquay, Devon, for which only two tickets were sold.

His second album Innocence was released in September 2005. The band was subsequently renamed 'Rik Waller's Mighty Soul Band', and then renamed again to 'Rik Waller's Unfinished Business'.

=== TV appearances ===
Waller has appeared as himself on several TV shows. In 2002, he appeared on Celebrity Fit Club, but he was kicked off the show when he was caught binge eating.

On 28 February 2007, Waller appeared on Never Mind the Buzzcocks in the Identity Parade Round and briefly replaced captain Phill Jupitus when it became clear who was the real Rik Waller. He has not appeared on TV since.

== Personal life ==
Waller was educated at The Howard School, Rainham, Kent. Waller's singing career ended in 2007 after he had lost his singing voice due to problems with severe laryngitis.

In 2013, Waller revealed in an interview with the Daily Mail that due to being jobless and penniless, he was receiving unemployment benefits. In 2014, he was working as an exam invigilator in Sittingbourne, Kent. Waller also said that, alongside his father, he once ran a mobile karaoke and disco business.

== Discography ==
Albums

- From Now... (July 2002)
- Innocence (July 2005)

Singles

- "I Will Always Love You" (March 2002) – UK No. 6
- "(Something Inside) So Strong" (June 2002) – UK No. 25

== Filmography ==
List of film appearances, with year, title, and role shown
Year	Title	Role	Notes
Pop Idol	2001	Self	
Pop Idol Extra	2001	Self	
Esther	2002	Self	
Kelly	2002	Self	
Top of the Pops	2002	Self	
Celebrity Fit Club	2002	Self	
The Weakest Link	2003	Self	aka Weakest Link Champions' League (UK)
Back to Reality	2004	Self	
Never Mind the Buzzcocks	2007	Self	Mystery guest
