= Hayley Evetts =

- Born: 4 March 1976 (age 50); Birmingham, England
- Genres: Pop
- Occupations: Singer, actress, presenter
- Years active: 2001–present
- Website: http://hayleyevetts.tripod.com/index.html

Hayley Evetts (born 4 March 1976 in Birmingham, England) is an English singer, television presenter and stage actress, who rose to fame on the ITV talent show Pop Idol.

== Career ==
Evetts first came to the attention of the public in 2001 when she appeared on Popstars. After failing to make either of the groups, later in that year she returned and auditioned for the first series of Pop Idol. She made the final 10 along with Will Young, Gareth Gates and Darius Danesh, eventually coming fifth.

The following year, Evetts presented Cruel Holiday for Sky TV. She also presented Popstars: The Rivals Extra on ITV2 alongside Dane Bowers. In 2003, she won the role of Sandy in Grease the Musical along with Jonathan Wilkes who played Danny.

In 2011, she independently released a single, "Waste My Time". In 2012, Evetts successfully auditioned at the Manchester auditions of The X Factor and made it through to bootcamp, but just missed out to progress to judges' houses.

=== Eurovision 2016 ===
On 11 February 2016, she was revealed to be one of the candidates to represent Romania in the Eurovision Song Contest 2016 with the song, "Brand New Day". However, in February 2016, it was revealed that she had withdrawn from the selection due to a severe knee injury.
