= Sarah Whatmore =

English musician (born 1981)

- Born: Sarah Louise Whatmore; 21 September 1981 (age 45); Salford, Greater Manchester, England
- Origin: Walkden, Salford, England
- Genres: Pop, Dance, Electronic
- Occupation: Singer-songwriter
- Instrument: Vocals
- Years active: 2001–present
- Labels: RCA Records; 19 Records; SW Music
- Website: http://sarahwhatmore.co.uk/

Sarah Louise Whatmore (born 21 September 1981) is an English singer-songwriter, best known for appearing in the first series of the British TV series Pop Idol. Whatmore later went on to launch her own solo career.

== Early life ==
Whatmore was born in Salford and raised in Walkden.

== Career ==
=== Pop Idol ===
Sarah Whatmore rose to fame in the first series of the British television show Pop Idol. Simon Fuller signed her to RCA Records including a worldwide management deal with 19 Entertainment.

=== Music career ===
In 2002 and 2003 she released two singles "When I Lost You" and "Automatic", respectively, which both reached the Top 20 in the UK Singles Chart. Whatmore was writing for fellow Pop Idol alumni, and spent time working on her debut album, Living Proof.

A third single failed to materialise, and the release of Living Proof was cancelled. Several recordings were leaked over the years, including "Close To Me" and "Don't Let Me Go".

Turning down the opportunity to become a backing singer for Kylie Minogue to concentrate on her own solo career, Whatmore spent the next five years honing her craft. During the years she wrote more than two hundred songs with various collaborators including Greg Fitzgerald and Peter John Vettese. Whatmore continued to record and write for herself as well as other musicians.

In 2008, she came up with an album of new material. The first single was titled "Smile", and was released on 22 September 2008. It contained a sample of Hall & Oates' "Sara Smile". The single included remixes by Bimbo Jones and Vito Benito. The album, Time To Think, was released on 23 March 2009. Her next single from the album was "Undefined".

In 2016 Whatmore started to officially release music again and published 3 tracks throughout the year, Whatmore released her first EP Full Circle on 24 March 2016.

== Discography ==
=== Studio albums ===
Title	Details
Time to Think	Released: 1 January 2009; Label: Sony; Formats: CD, digital download

=== Extended plays ===
Title	Details
Full Circle	Released: 24 March 2016; Label: SW Music; Format: Digital download

=== Singles ===
Year	Single	Peak chart positions				Album
Year	Single	UK	AUS	IRE	SCO	Album
2002	"When I Lost You"	6	49	32	10	Non-album singles
2003	"Automatic"	11	—	20	—	Non-album singles
2008	"Smile"	—	—	—	—	Time to Think
2009	"Undefined"	—	—	—	—	Time to Think
2016	"Touchscreen"	—	—	—	—	Full Circle
2016	"The Cure"	—	—	—	—	Full Circle
2016	"Full Circle"	—	—	—	—	Full Circle
2026	"Hate"	—	—	—	—	
"—" denotes a title that did not chart, or was not released in that territory.
