= When I Lost You (Sarah Whatmore song) =

2002 single by Sarah Whatmore

Single by Sarah Whatmore
- B-side: "Are You Ready for Love"
- Released: 9 September 2002
- Length: 3:17
- Label: BMG UK & Ireland; RCA; 19
- Songwriter: Richard Stannard
- Producer: Richard Stannard

Sarah Whatmore singles chronology
"When I Lost You" (2002)	"Automatic" (2003)

Music video
- "When I Lost You" on YouTube

"When I Lost You" is the debut single of the English singer Sarah Whatmore, written and produced by Richard Stannard. The song was originally due to be included on her debut album; however, her record company decided to pull the album. The song was originally written for Kylie Minogue's album Fever (2001).

The single was released on CD on 9 September 2002 in the United Kingdom. It peaked at number 6 on the UK Singles Chart in September 2002 and number 32 in Ireland the next month. In Australia, the song was released on 10 March 2003 and made a brief appearance on the ARIA Singles Chart, peaking at number 49 in May 2003.

== Track listings ==
UK and Irish CD single

1. "When I Lost You"
2. "Are You Ready for Love"
3. "When I Lost You" (M*A*S*H master mix)
4. "When I Lost You" (video)

UK 12-inch single

A. "When I Lost You" (K-Klass Ultimate vocal mix)
B. "When I Lost You" (Flatline's Whatever Next?... Monkey Tennis vocal mix)

UK cassette single

1. "When I Lost You"
2. "Are You Ready for Love"

Australian CD single

1. "When I Lost You"
2. "Are You Ready for Love"
3. "When I Lost You" (M*A*S*H master mix)
4. "When I Lost You" (K-Klass ultimate vocal mix)
5. "When I Lost You" (video)

== Charts ==
=== Weekly charts ===
Chart (2002–2003)	Peak position
Australia (ARIA)	49
Europe (Eurochart Hot 100)	31
Ireland (IRMA)	32
Scottish Singles Sales (Official Charts)	10
UK Singles (Official Charts)	6

=== Year-end charts ===
Chart (2002)	Position
UK Singles (OCC)	129

== Release history ==
Region	Date	Format(s)	Label(s)	Ref(s).
United Kingdom	9 September 2002	12-inch vinyl; CD; cassette	BMG UK & Ireland; RCA; 19	
Australia	10 March 2003	CD	BMG UK & Ireland; RCA; 19	
