= Dive In =

Studio album by Darius Danesh
- Released: 2 December 2002
- Genre: Pop
- Label: Mercury Records
- Producers: The Misfits (Pete Glenister, Deni Lew), The Matrix, Mike Hedges, Alex James, Darius Danesh

Darius Danesh chronology
Dive In (2002)	Live Twice (2004)

Singles from Dive In
- 1. "Colourblind" Released: 29 July 2002; 2. "Rushes" Released: 25 November 2002; 3. "Incredible (What I Meant to Say)" Released: 3 March 2003; 4. "Girl in the Moon" Released: 9 June 2003

Professional ratings
Review scores
Source	Rating
TOTP Magazine	4.0/5 stars
Smash Hits	5.0/5 stars
BBC News Review	(not rated) link
Yahoo! Music	link

Dive In is the debut album by Darius Danesh, released on 2 December 2002. It was a huge success and went platinum in the UK, charting at number 6 on the UK Albums Chart during the competitive pre-Christmas sales. He wrote all 12 songs on the album, collaborating with a number of other producers such as The Misfits (Pete Glenister, Deni Lew) and The Matrix. Steve Lillywhite was executive producer and Darius himself produced the track "Better Than That".

== Album information ==
The first single "Colourblind", was released on 29 July 2002 and went straight to number 1 in the UK for two weeks and was certified silver. The second single "Rushes", also did well, going to number 5 in the UK charts, and the third single "Incredible (What I Meant to Say)" went to number 9. The fourth and last single "Girl in the Moon" did not do as well but still got to number 21. The album actually has 69 tracks, but after the first 12 they are all 5 seconds of silence until the last one, which is a songwriting demo of "Gotta Know Tonight", effectively making it a hidden track. This songwriting demo has lyrics and music written by Danesh, showing the song as it was first written before other producers added their production ideas to the song. The album was certified platinum in the UK for selling over 300,000 copies.

== Track listing ==
No.	Title	Writer(s)	Producer(s)	Length
1.	"Colourblind"	Darius Danesh, Pete Glenister, Deni Lew	The Misfits (Pete Glenister, Deni Lew)	3:35
2.	"Rushes"	Darius Danesh, Pete Glenister, Deni Lew	The Misfits (Pete Glenister, Deni Lew)	3:43
3.	"Incredible (What I Meant to Say)"	Darius Danesh, The Matrix	The Matrix	3:37
4.	"Girl in the Moon"	Darius Danesh, Pete Glenister, Deni Lew	The Misfits (Pete Glenister, Deni Lew)	4:02
5.	"I'm Not Buying"	Darius Danesh, Pete Glenister, Deni Lew	The Misfits (Pete Glenister, Deni Lew)	4:21
6.	"Dive In"	Darius Danesh, Chris Braide, Andrew Frampton	Mike Hedges	3:37
7.	"Gotta Know Tonight"	Darius Danesh, Chris Braide, Andrew Frampton	Mike Hedges	4:12
8.	"Sliding Doors"	Darius Danesh, Pete Glenister, Deni Lew	The Misfits (Pete Glenister, Deni Lew)	4:24
9.	"Simple Like the Truth"	Darius Danesh, Pete Glenister, Deni Lew	The Misfits (Pete Glenister, Deni Lew)	3:58
10.	"Better Than That"	Darius Danesh, Alex James, Louis Read	Alex James, Louis Read	3:33
11.	"Mockingbird"	Darius Danesh, Pete Glenister, Deni Lew, Nicky Graham	The Misfits (Pete Glenister, Deni Lew)	4:01
12.	"Mercury Rising"	Darius Danesh, Pete Glenister	The Misfits (Pete Glenister, Deni Lew)	4:54

== Personnel ==
- Artwork – Tom Bird
- Executive Producer – Steve Lillywhite
- Photography – Norman Watson
- Producer – The Misfits (Pete Glenister, Deni Lew), (tracks: 1, 2, 4, 5, 8, 9, 11, 12)

== Charts ==
=== Weekly charts ===
Chart (2002)	Peak position
Scottish Albums (Official Charts)	3
UK Albums (Official Charts)	6

=== Year-end charts ===
Chart (2002)	Position
UK Albums (OCC)	66
Chart (2003)	Position
UK Albums (OCC)	159

== Certifications ==
Chart	Certification	Sales
UK	Platinum	300,000+
