= Rushes (song) =

2002 single by Darius Danesh

Single by Darius

from the album Dive In
- B-side: "Tear Run Dry" (demo); "Freefall" (demo)
- Released: 25 November 2002
- Genre: Pop; rock
- Length: 3:43
- Label: Mercury
- Songwriters: Darius Danesh; Pete Glenister; Deni Lew
- Producers: Pete Glenister; Deni Lew

Darius singles chronology
"Colourblind" (2002)	"Rushes" (2002)	"Incredible (What I Meant to Say)" (2003)

"Rushes" is a song by Scottish singer-songwriter Darius. It was his second single release and was taken from his 2002 debut album, Dive In. "Rushes" was released on 25 November 2002, reaching number five on the UK Singles Chart and number 37 in Ireland.

== Production ==
Darius wrote "Rushes" when he was 16 years old. He originally wrote the lyrics on the back of a bus ticket. It is about a girl who got on the same bus as him, but he could not pluck up the courage to speak to her. As with the majority of the songs on his album, he was involved in the creative writing process.

== Critical reception ==
Michael Osborn wrote in a review for the BBC that the song is "a rich, chugging, rock-tinged little ditty", although he also commented that it is "hardly a quirky experiment lacking in pop sensibilities".

== Music video ==
The video for "Rushes" was shot in Los Angeles and is about adrenalin rushes. In the video, Darius arrives at his home on a motorbike. He then goes up to his apartment and arranges to meet his band members for a gig later that day. He gets ready for the gig and then goes out to meet his band members by his car. The band members shown in the video were Darius' band members at that time, namely, Karl Brazil, Deeral, and Greg Haley. They travel to the gig, speeding through a tunnel, but are then held up by traffic, eventually coming to a standstill. To get to the gig on time they decide to get out of their car and walk the rest of the way. The band and Darius then perform the gig in front of an audience.

== Track listings ==
UK CD1

1. "Rushes"
2. "Tear Run Dry" (songwriting demo)
3. "Colourblind" (8 Jam remix)
4. "Rushes" (video)

UK CD2

1. "Rushes"
2. "Freefall" (songwriting demo)
3. "Rushes" (acoustic)

== Charts ==
=== Weekly charts ===
Chart (2002)	Peak position
Europe (Eurochart Hot 100)	27
Ireland (IRMA)	37
Scotland Singles (OCC)	2
UK Singles (OCC)	5

=== Year-end charts ===
Chart (2002)	Position
UK Singles (OCC)	176
