= (Something Inside) So Strong =

Single by Labi Siffre

from the album So Strong
- B-side: "I'm Alright"
- Released: February 1987
- Genre: R&B, gospel
- Length: 4:10
- Label: China
- Songwriter: Labi Siffre
- Producer: Glyn Johns

Labi Siffre singles chronology
"Nightmare" (1982)	"(Something Inside) So Strong" (1987)	"Nothin's Gonna Change" (1987)

"(Something Inside) So Strong" is a song written and recorded by British singer-songwriter Labi Siffre. Released as a single in 1987, it was one of the biggest successes of his career, peaking at number four on the UK Singles Chart.

The song was written in 1984, inspired by a television documentary on apartheid in South Africa seen by Siffre in which white soldiers were filmed shooting at black civilians in the street. He told the BBC's Soul Music programme in 2014 that the song was also influenced by his experience as a homosexual child, adolescent, and adult. Siffre originally intended to give the song to another artist to sing, but could find no one suitable and was persuaded to release it himself.

The song has remained enduringly popular and is an example of the political and sociological thread running through much of Siffre's lyrics and poetry. It won the Ivor Novello Award for Best Song Musically and Lyrically, and has been used in Amnesty International campaigns.

The song was the subject of a 2014 episode of BBC Radio 4's Soul Music, in which a range of speakers including Siffre discussed the song's significance to them.

In September 2025 Siffre issued a cease and desist order to British far-right activist Tommy Robinson, over his use of the song at a rally, saying: "Anybody who knows me... will know the joke of them using the work of a positive atheist, homosexual black artist as apparently representative of their movement."

Years later the song was also done by South African musician Lira to critical acclaim.

== Charts ==
=== Weekly charts ===
Chart (1987)	Peak position
Australia (Kent Music Report)	76
Ireland (Irish Singles Chart)	2
Netherlands (Nederlandse Top 40)	3
United Kingdom (Official Charts Company)	4

=== Year-end charts ===
Chart (1987)	Position
Netherlands (Dutch Top 40)	28

== Kenny Rogers ==
Kenny Rogers performed a version on his 1989 album Something Inside So Strong.

== The Rosa Parks Tribute Singers version ==
In 1995, Verity Records released Verity Records Presents: A Tribute to Mrs. Rosa Parks. A cover version performed by a chorus of gospel singers, including Fred Hammond (who produced the track), Yolanda Adams, Shirley Caesar, Daryl Coley and Vanessa Bell Armstrong, was the first track.

== Rik Waller version ==
Pop Idol contestant Rik Waller reached number 25 on the UK Singles Chart with his cover version in July 2002.

== Shaun Williamson performance ==
In 2014, British actor Shaun Williamson performed the song live at the 2014 World Indoor Bowls Championship. After being televised live nationally, it became a meme and was mashed up in video form with two successive U.S. presidential inauguration ceremonies.
