= Rosie Ribbons =

Welsh singer-songwriter

- Born: Rosemary Ribbons; Wales
- Origin: Pontardawe, Wales, United Kingdom
- Genre: Pop
- Years active: 2002–2012
- Label: Telstar Records
- Website: Official website

Rosemary "Rosie" Ribbons is a Welsh singer-songwriter. She achieved fame by being one of the finalists in the ITV1 talent show Pop Idol. Subsequently, she went on to have two UK top 20 hits.

== Career ==
In 2001, bored with her supermarket job, Ribbons auditioned for ITV1's talent show Pop Idol. She initially performed her own composition called "Colours" to judges Simon Cowell, Nicki Chapman, Neil Fox and record producer Pete Waterman. Although impressed with her vocal, Cowell suggested that she pick a more familiar song. Taking his advice, Ribbons next performed "Hero" by Mariah Carey, a performance that moved Waterman to tears.

Ribbons progressed through the competition and made the top 50. She won her heat with a version of "(Everything I Do) I Do It for You" by Bryan Adams, receiving over half of the total votes cast for her group. She was eventually voted out by viewers finishing in 6th place.

Although Ribbons did not win Pop Idol, Telstar Records signed her to a five-album deal, reportedly worth £1,000,000. After supporting Liberty X on tour, her first two singles "Blink" and "A Little Bit" (a cover of a Jessica Simpson song) were both UK top-20 hits. After the disappointing chart position of "A Little Bit" Telstar went to work on getting ready to release the third single only a few weeks later. Initially Telstar had chosen "Good Thing" before deciding on a double A Side, featuring "Good Thing" and "Heaven". After supporting Blue on their "One Love" Tour Telstar decided that a totally fresh, new track had to be released something guaranteed to succeed. Rosie was back in the studio recording a modern-day remake of the Deee-Lite hit "Groove is in the Heart". At one point there were discussions that the double A side would feature "Naked" and "Groove is in the Heart". Due to Telstar's financial problems her contract was subsequently terminated before the third single or album could be released.

Even though this million-pound deal was terminated, a promotional version of Ribbons's debut album did surface under the title Misbehaving. The track list included her self-written Pop Idol audition song "Colours", among the following:

1. "Good Thing" (4:03)
2. "A Little Bit" (4:02)
3. "Blink" (3:15)
4. "Deadly Sin #8" (3:30)
5. "Heaven" (3:52)
6. "Coming Up for Air" (3:45)
7. "Trusted" (3:51)
8. "No Space to Rent" (3:32)
9. "Even Angels" (3:48)
10. "Ain't That the Way" (4:09)
11. "Colours" (4:13)

According to the forthcoming album information on the official artwork of the "Blink" single, this unreleased debut was originally titled Levitate. The album would finally be released in 2018

In 2005 Ribbons returned to the studio to work on a new album. Three tracks were recorded and due to appear on this album ("Nothing's Changed" and "If Only the World Could Smile"). Clips of these recordings could be heard on her official Myspace page, however, no new album or singles were released.

In 2007, now living in Dubbo, Australia, Ribbons auditioned for Australian Idol with another original song, "Butterfly Wings". This time the judges did not ask for a second, more familiar song. She was accepted into the Top 100 and went on to make the Top 24. In the fourth semi-finals on 29 August 2007 Ribbons sang R.E.M.'s "Everybody Hurts". She was the last contestant to perform on the night. On 30 August 2007, Ribbons did not make the final 12, nor was she chosen to come back as a wild card, therefore she was officially eliminated from the competition.

Ribbons returned to the UK after Australian Idol to perform and record new music. She released the single "Turning Point" featuring MOBO Award winner MC Neat in 2011.

In March 2012 Ribbons was the featured vocalist on the title track of the Alonestar EP "Warrior", a release which also featured English singer-songwriter and Brit Award winner Ed Sheeran, who accompanies Ribbons on the track "All Falls Down" from the same EP.

== Discography ==
=== Singles ===
Year	Month	Single	Chart Position
2002	October	"Blink"	12
2003	January	"A Little Bit"	19

=== Albums ===
Year	Album	Chart
2003	Misbehaving/Levitate (released 2018)	-
