= Incredible (What I Meant to Say) =

2003 single by Darius

Single by Darius

from the album Dive In
- B-side: "Pretty Flamingo"; "Fragile"; "Don't Forget to Breathe"
- Released: 3 March 2003
- Studio: Decoy (Encino, California)
- Length: 3:37
- Label: Mercury
- Songwriters: Darius; The Matrix
- Producer: The Matrix

Darius singles chronology
"Rushes" (2002)	"Incredible (What I Meant to Say)" (2003)	"Girl in the Moon" (2003)

Music video
- "Incredible (What I Meant to Say)" on YouTube

"Incredible (What I Meant to Say)" is a song by Scottish singer-songwriter Darius, released as the third single from his debut album, Dive In (2002). It peaked at number nine on the UK Singles Chart, making it his third consecutive top-10 hit.

== Music video ==
The video was shot over two days at the Estacion De Francia train station in Barcelona, Spain.

After Darius has an argument with his girlfriend, played by model Kate Groombridge, he tries to find her to apologise, but the train he thinks she is on leaves before he can say sorry. He then exits the train station down-hearted, just missing his girlfriend, who returns to find him.

== Track listings ==
UK CD1

1. "Incredible (What I Meant to Say)"
2. "Rushes" (8 Jam remix)
3. "Pretty Flamingo"
4. "Incredible (What I Meant to Say)" (video)

UK CD2

1. "Incredible (What I Meant to Say)"
2. "Fragile"
3. "Don't Forget to Breathe"

UK cassette single

1. "Incredible (What I Meant to Say)"
2. "Rushes" (8 Jam remix)

== Credits and personnel ==
Credits and personnel are adapted from the Dive In album liner notes.

- Darius – writing, lead vocals, additional guitar, backing vocals
- The Matrix – writing, production, arrangement, recording
- Jeremy Wheatley – mixing
- Corky James – guitars
- Ruben Martinez – backing vocals

== Charts ==
Chart (2003)	Peak position
Europe (Eurochart Hot 100)	37
Ireland (IRMA)	21
Scottish Singles Sales (Official Charts)	7
UK Singles (Official Charts)	9

== Release history ==
Region	Date	Format(s)	Label	Ref.
United Kingdom	3 March 2003	CD; cassette	Mercury	
