= Live Twice (album) =

Studio album by Darius Danesh
- Released: 25 October 2004
- Genres: Pop; rock
- Length: 51:36
- Label: Mercury
- Producers: Stephen Lipson; Darius Danesh

Darius Danesh chronology
| Dive In (2002) | Live Twice (2004) |

Singles from Live Twice
- 1. "Kinda Love" Released: 18 October 2004; 2. "Live Twice" Released: 10 January 2005

Live Twice is Darius Danesh's second and final album, released in 2004. It did not do as well as his previous album, Dive In, charting at number 36 in the UK Albums Chart. He wrote 12 songs on the album; the only song he does not have a writing credit for is Save Me. Stephen Lipson was the executive producer.

== Content ==
The first single released from the album was Kinda Love on 18 October 2004. It peaked at number 8 on the UK singles chart. The second and final single from the album was the title track, Live Twice, released on 10 January 2005. It reached number 7 on the UK Singles Chart, making it his fifth single to reach the UK top 10.

== Track listing ==
| No. | Title | Length |
|---|---|---|
| 1. | "Kinda Love" | 3:16 |
| 2. | "Live Twice" | 3:49 |
| 3. | "How Do You Like It?" | 3:48 |
| 4. | "Better Man" | 3:50 |
| 5. | "Resolution" | 5:19 |
| 6. | "Stars Crash Down" | 3:23 |
| 7. | "Save Me" | 3:28 |
| 8. | "If I Could" | 3:21 |
| 9. | "Only You" | 3:32 |
| 10. | "Love to Love" | 3:31 |
| 11. | "Journey's End" | 4:42 |
| 12. | "Devil in You" | 9:37 |
| Total length: | | 51:36 |
