= Live Twice (song) =

2005 single by Darius Danesh

Single by Darius

from the album Live Twice
- B-side: "Mystery of You"; "Big Feather Bed"; "I Would Die for You"
- Released: 10 January 2005
- Length: 3:49
- Label: Mercury
- Songwriters: Darius; Graham Stack; Tim Woodcock
- Producers: Graham Stack; Brian Rawling

Darius singles chronology
"Kinda Love" (2004)	"Live Twice" (2005)

"Live Twice" is the title track and the second single from Scottish singer Darius's second album, Live Twice (2004). The song was released on 10 January 2005 as his sixth and final single. It peaked at number seven on the UK Singles Chart and number 24 in Ireland. This was the final single to be released during Darius's lifetime.

== Song history ==
The song was written about Darius's father, who was diagnosed with terminal cancer.

== Music video ==
The video for "Live Twice" was filmed in Málaga, Spain in black and white. The church bell tolls and Darius is holding a rosary. He removes his tie and watch, symbolic of letting go of the material World. Groups of photographers and fans try to catch his attention but Darius walks through them like a spirit. He is shown chasing after a white horse but when it eventually stops it dies peacefully whilst a girl releases a dove as a symbol of hope. The white stallion used in filming the video also made an appearance as Brad Pitt's horse in the movie Troy.

== Track listings ==
UK CD1

1. "Live Twice"
2. "Mystery of You"

UK CD2

1. "Live Twice"
2. "Big Feather Bed"
3. "I Would Die for You"
4. Enhanced section

UK DVD single

1. "Live Twice" (video)
2. "Live Twice" (behind the scenes footage)
3. "Now or Never" (audio)

== Charts ==
Chart (2005)	Peak position
Ireland (IRMA)	24
Scottish Singles Sales (Official Charts)	4
UK Singles (Official Charts)	7
