= Pop Idol =

British music competition television series

- Genre: Reality competition
- Created by: Simon Fuller
- Developed by: Nigel Lythgoe (uncredited)
- Presented by: Ant McPartlin; Declan Donnelly
- Judges: Neil Fox; Nicki Chapman; Pete Waterman; Simon Cowell
- Composers: Cathy Dennis; Julian Gingell; Barry Stone
- Country of origin: United Kingdom
- Original language: English
- No. of series: 2
- No. of episodes: 46

Production
- Executive producers: Simon Fuller; Nigel Lythgoe; Richard Holloway; Ken Warwick; Simon Cowell
- Production locations: Various (auditions); Criterion Theatre (theatre rounds); Teddington Studios (heats); The Fountain Studios (live finals)
- Running time: 60–165 mins (inc. adverts)
- Production companies: 19 Entertainment; Thames Television

Original release
- Network: ITV
- Release: 6 October 2001 – 20 December 2003

Related
- Pop Idol Extra

Pop Idol is a British music competition television series created by Simon Fuller which ran on ITV from 2001 to 2003. The aim of the show was to decide the best new young pop singer (or "pop idol") in the UK based on viewer voting and participation. Two series were broadcast, one in 2001–2002 and a second in 2003. An immense success when it launched in 2001, Maggie Brown in The Guardian wrote, "the show became a seminal reality/entertainment format once on air that autumn". Series judge Simon Cowell became a major public figure in entertainment, and the show produced instant No. 1 chart hits, including for the first series winner Will Young, whose single "Evergreen" was the fastest-selling debut in British chart history and the best-selling song of 2002. Pop Idol was subsequently put on an indefinite hiatus after Simon Cowell announced the launch of The X Factor in the UK in April 2004.

The show has become an international television franchise since, spawning multiple Idol series around the world. In the meantime, a legal dispute arose with the makers of Popstars, which eventually led to the word "pop" being excluded from the titles of all the spin-offs, such as American Idol, Australian Idol, Arab Idol, Canadian Idol, Indonesian Idol, Indian Idol, New Zealand Idol, Latin American Idol, Maldivian Idol, Idol (Norway), Idol (Poland), Idol (Sweden), Singapore Idol, Idols (South Africa), Pakistan Idol, Bangladeshi Idol and Ídolos (same name for the Portuguese and Brazilian series).

The show's theme music was written by Gingell/Stone and Cathy Dennis.

== Format ==
One of the UK's top-earning TV format exports, Pop Idol made extensive use of premium-priced viewer interactivity, with viewers voting by telephone, mobile telephone texting (not used on series one), through the "red button" on digital television sets, or via the official website. The final of the first series of Pop Idol in February 2002 received the highest-ever one-night vote for a British TV show, making the show one of ITV's most profitable. The sister shows on ITV2, Pop Idol Extra, hosted by Kate Thornton also made extensive use of mobile phone text messages to raise additional revenue. The first Pop Idol received very high voting figures despite allowing only telephone and Internet voting and not making use of texting or the "red button". However, the 'voting' system was effectively meaningless, as any individual was permitted to make an unlimited number of votes, the winning contestant thus being merely the one with the most persistent supporters.

The Saturday night primetime show initially followed the audition process, as hopefuls sang before four judges (record producer and music executive Pete Waterman, music executive and music manager Simon Cowell, music promoter and music manager Nicki Chapman and Radio DJ and television personality Neil "Dr" Fox) at various locations around the UK. Besides the successful auditionees, the poorest "singers" were often aired due to their obvious lack of talent or presence. Poor singers often faced harsh criticisms from the judges, especially from Simon Cowell (whose controversial rantings also made him famous on American Idol). The judges' reactions to such performances often ranged from disgust to nearly open laughter; their style of judgement and attitude towards pop-star wannabes resulted in the controversial opinions of others about the show's setup, including that of Take That manager Nigel Martin Smith.

The viewing public quickly fell in love with the format though, as viewing figures indicated. The judges' policy of speaking candidly would have to be sanitised in series 2, however, as it received condemnation from MPs.

Once the first round of auditions was completed, the series moved to the Criterion Theatre, where further auditions saw the judges decide on a group of 50. Unusually, this was the final point at which the judges had direct control over the contestants' fates, as the remainder of the results would be driven solely by viewer voting.

Stage 3 of the series took place in a conventional TV studio. The 50 contestants were split into five groups of ten, each of whom sang one song for the judges, accompanied only by a piano. Each judge offered their opinion, and at the end of the pre-recorded show phone lines opened for votes. Later the same evening a live show followed in which the voting results were revealed, the top two earning a place in the final ten. In series 2, a wildcard round (an innovation that originated on American Idol) was added, in which the judges selected ten rejected contestants and gave them a second chance. In this special edition, one contestant, Susanne Manning, was selected by the viewer vote, and one, Sam Nixon, was chosen by the judges. This meant that the next stage began with twelve contestants, rather than the ten in series 1.

For the final stage, the show moved to a more lavish TV set, where all remaining contestants sang on live television, accompanied by either a backing track or live band. Most editions had a theme, with contestants singing songs from a particular genre or artist (no original songs were performed at any stage in the competition). Again, the judges offered comments, but the results were decided by viewer voting. Again, a live results show was broadcast later in the evening, but this time the singer with the fewest votes was eliminated, the rest continuing to the following week until only the winner remained.

Exceptions to the usual format were limited. In series 1, Darius Danesh was promoted to the live shows when Rik Waller dropped out. Danesh was third in the results for the group where Waller had won his place. Also, the first two live shows of series 2 saw two contestants leave, in order to rebalance the numbers after the addition of the two extra performers from the wildcard show.

== Results and legacy ==
The first series was won by Will Young, with Gareth Gates coming second. Michelle McManus won the second series. All of the top three contestants from series 1 had number-one singles in the UK. Young continues to be a recording artist. Gates initially had great success as a recording artist, releasing three studio albums and seven top 5 singles. He has since moved on to a successful career in musical theatre appearing as lead in Joseph and the Amazing Technicolor Dreamcoat, as Marius in Les Misérables, on tour and in the West End and as Claude in Hair. In 2013, he became a member of the supergroup 5th Story. Darius Danesh had two hit albums and appeared in the West End musicals Chicago, playing the role of Billy Flynn, and Gone with the Wind, originating the role of Rhett Butler. He also appeared in the touring version of Guys and Dolls as Sky Masterson. Finalists Rosie Ribbons and Zoe Birkett have both scored chart hits, Birkett also moving on to a career in musical theatre whilst Jessica Garlick represented the UK in the Eurovision Song Contest 2002. Semi-finalist Sarah Whatmore had two chart hits, despite failing to be voted into the top 10. Series 2 contestants enjoyed significantly less chart success, which many believe damaged the credibility of the show and helped hasten its demise in its home country.

Immediately after the second series of Pop Idol, the same set was used to host World Idol, in which winners of various Idol series around the world, including original Pop Idol winner Will Young, American Idol winner Kelly Clarkson and Australian Idol winner Guy Sebastian, competed in a one-off competition, complete with a large judging panel featuring one judge from each country (Simon Cowell officially representing American Idol, with Pete Waterman the "official" UK judge). The surprise winner was Norway's Kurt Nilsen, who proceeded to minor UK chart success. Cowell was strongly critical of World Idol, and it is highly unlikely to be staged again.

After the second series of Pop Idol, ITV put the show on indefinite hiatus when in April 2004 judge and music executive Simon Cowell announced the launch of his own show, The X Factor, which he and his record label (Syco) held the rights to. In September 2004, Pop Idol creator Simon Fuller filed a lawsuit against The X Factor producers claiming that the format was copied from his own show. The case was eventually settled out of court in November 2005, and as part of the settlement, Simon Fuller was made a joint partner in The X Factor show, and Simon Cowell was obliged to stay on as a judge on American Idol for a further five years.

ITV's licence to produce Pop Idol has since expired, meaning that other channels could theoretically acquire the series. Despite rumours, no broadcaster has since acquired the rights to the format in the UK.

Despite running for only two series, Pop Idol's impact was immense and led 19 Entertainment and FremantleMedia to roll the format out globally; currently there are over 50 versions in 110 countries, including, notably, American Idol, on which Cowell was a judge until 2010, before launching The X Factor USA in 2011.

== Series 1 (2001–02) ==
Colour key

–	Contestant was in the bottom two
–	Contestant was in the bottom three
–	Contestant received the fewest public votes and was eliminated
–	Contestant received the most public votes (weeks 1 to 8)
–	Contestant won the competition

Contestant	Week 1	Week 2	Week 3	Week 4	Week 5	Week 6	Week 7	Week 8	Week 9
Will Young	1st 27.3%	1st 22.6%	1st 21.3%	1st 29.8%	2nd 25.2%	2nd 24.0%	2nd 27.9%	1st 39.8%	Winner; 53.1%
Gareth Gates	2nd 26.3%	2nd 20.8%	2nd 21.0%	2nd 23.3%	1st 36.6%	1st 25.4%	1st 28.7%	2nd 39.3%	Runner-up; 46.9%
Darius Campbell	N/A^{1}	3rd 19.0%	3rd 18.2%	3rd 18.0%	4th 13.3%	3rd 23.7%	3rd 24.5%	3rd 20.9%	Eliminated (week 8)
Zoe Birkett	3rd 10.8%	4th 14.2%	4th 11.4%	5th 7.8%	3rd 14.0%	4th 15.6%	4th 18.9%	Eliminated (week 7)	
Hayley Evetts	6th 6.8%	5th 5.1%	5th 8.4%	4th 10.8%	5th 5.8%	5th 11.3%	Eliminated (week 6)		
Rosie Ribbons	4th 10.5%	7th 4.8%	7th 6.9%	6th 5.5%	6th 5.1%	Eliminated (week 5)			
Laura Doherty	8th 4.3%	8th 4.3%	6th 7.1%	7th 4.8%	Eliminated (week 4)				
Aaron Bayley	5th 6.8%	6th 5.4%	8th 5.7%	Eliminated (week 3)					
Jessica Garlick	7th 4.6%	9th 3.8%	Eliminated (week 2)						
Rik Waller	N/A	Withdrew (week 2)							
Korben	9th 2.6%	Eliminated (week 1)							

- ^{1} Had been eliminated in previous rounds, but reinstated following Rik Waller's exit.

== Series 2 (2003) ==
Following the completion of the series, the official Pop Idol companion book published percentages of votes for each contestant every week. In some circumstances, the book suggested that the bottom 2 or 3 contestants were not the same as announced by the show hosts. It is not known if the incorrect result was announced, or if the book merely made a typing error. However, the contestant deemed to have had the lowest percentage was always eliminated on that week, meaning the overall result of the show was not changed.

Colour key

–	Contestant was in the bottom two
–	Contestant was in the bottom three
–	Contestant received the fewest public votes and was eliminated
–	Contestant received the most public votes (weeks 1–8)
–	Contestant won the competition

Contestant	Week 1	Week 2	Week 3	Week 4	Week 5	Week 6	Week 7	Week 8	Week 9
Michelle McManus	5th 9.9%	1st 17.2%	6th 10.7%	1st 23.3%	1st 24.3%	2nd 29.0%	1st 40.0%	1st 40.3%	Winner; 58.2%
Mark Rhodes	10th 4.9%	7th 7.1%	2nd 15.5%	5th 10.9%	5th 13.7%	3rd 15.1%	3rd 19.0%	2nd 33.6%	Runner-up; 41.8%
Sam Nixon	2nd 12.4%	5th 11.1%	5th 11.5%	2nd 16.8%	2nd 18.0%	1st 34.2%	2nd 23.4%	3rd 26.0%	Eliminated (week 8)
Chris Hide	3rd 11.0%	6th 8.1%	3rd 13.5%	6th 10.9%	3rd 16.9%	4th 12.2%	4th 17.5%	Eliminated (week 7)	
Susanne Manning	1st 16.8%	4th 13.4%	1st 22.3%	4th 11.9%	4th 13.8%	5th 9.7%	Eliminated (week 6)		
Roxanne Cooper	8th 5.2%	3rd 13.4%	7th 9.6%	3rd 16.5%	6th 13.2%	Eliminated (week 5)			
Andy Scott-Lee	7th 7.1%	2nd 16.0%	4th 12.3%	7th 9.8%	Eliminated (week 4)				
Kim Gee	6th 8.2%	8th 5.7%	8th 4.6%	Eliminated (week 3)					
Brian Ormond	9th 5.2%	9th 5.0%	Eliminated (week 2)						
Marc Dillon	4th 11.0%	10th 4.2%	Eliminated (week 2)						
Kirsty Crawford	11th 4.2%	Eliminated (week 1)							
Leon McPherson	12th 4.0%	Eliminated (week 1)							

- In week 1 of the finals, Chris and Marc received the same vote percentage as did Roxanne and Brian. In week 4, Mark and Chris received the same vote percentage.

== Video games ==
Pop Idol was released as a video game published by Codemasters for the PlayStation 2 and Game Boy Advance it was also released for the PC on 30 October 2003. The player creates his/her own singer, then they must sing their way through the auditions, theatre stages, heats, and then the finals. The game increases in difficulty as the player progresses through the competition. With each stage of the finals, one or two players with the least public vote tally are eliminated. The gameplay mainly consists of lining up a moving symbol with a fixed object in the centre of the screen and pressing the corresponding symbol on the game's controller. If the player presses it when the symbol is in the middle of the circle, their singer sings a good note. If he or she presses it when it is not in the circle, or mistimes their press, the singer sings a bad note.

== Related programmes ==
The Idol format has been launched in dozens of nations worldwide, and there have been many imitations of the programme.

A World Idol international television special was held in December 2003, featuring national first series Idol contest winners competing against each other; viewers worldwide voted Norwegian Idol's Kurt Nilsen "World Idol".

The similar Popstars format preceded Pop Idol, and was succeeded in Britain by one series of Popstars: The Rivals and fifteen series of The X Factor as of 2018. After Popstars producers threatened legal action, a deal was struck that, among other clauses, does not allow the use of the word "pop" in the title of Pop Idol editions outside of the UK.

== See also ==
- Pop Idol discography
- Pop Idol: The Big Band Album
- American Idol
- Australian Idol
- Ídolos
- Popstars
- Fame Academy
- The X Factor
- Starmania
