= Darius Campbell Danesh =

Scottish musician and actor (1980–2022)

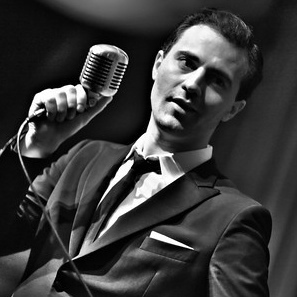
- Campbell Danesh performing live in 2012

Background information
- Also known as: Darius
- Born: 19 August 1980; Glasgow, Scotland
- Died: 11 August 2022 (aged 41) Rochester, Minnesota, US
- Genres: Pop; acoustic; swing; opera
- Occupations: Singer; songwriter; actor
- Instruments: Vocals; guitar
- Years active: 2000–2022
- Labels: 19; Mercury
- Spouse: Natasha Henstridge (m. 2011; div. 2018)

Darius Campbell Danesh (19 August 1980 – 11 August 2022) was a Scottish singer-songwriter, actor and film producer. He first came to prominence known as Darius Danesh when he appeared in the first series of Popstars in 2001, and the 2002 inaugural series of the ITV talent contest Pop Idol.

Under the name Darius, he released two studio albums, Dive In (2002) and Live Twice (2004), with both reaching the top 10 on the albums charts in his native Scotland, and the top 40 in the UK Albums Chart. His debut single, "Colourblind", reached No. 1 in the UK singles chart in 2002. His next singles, "Rushes" and "Incredible (What I Meant to Say)", reached the top ten in Scotland and the United Kingdom in 2002 and 2003, respectively. Danesh performed the role of Billy Flynn in the West End production of Chicago in two runs of the musical. He played the lead role of Sky Masterson in the Olivier Award-winning Guys and Dolls, and the role of Rhett Butler in Trevor Nunn's theatrical adaptation of Gone with the Wind.

In 2010, he trained with tenor Rolando Villazón, won the ITV competition Popstar to Operastar and performed a duet with Villazón on The Impossible Dream. He made his operatic début at the age of 29, in the lead role of Escamillo, Carmen's lover in Carmen, at the O_{2} Arena with the Royal Philharmonic. The same year, he also starred in The History of the Big Bands tour, a show about the big band and swing era.

He returned to the West End playing the lead roles of Warden in From Here to Eternity The Musical in 2013, NIck Arnstein in Funny Girl 2015-2016, and Billy Flynn in the touring production of Chicago 2017.

He produced several films, including Imperium starring Daniel Radcliffe, Tomorrow, the documentary Fountain of Youth, and House Red starring Natasha Henstridge.

== Early life ==
Campbell Danesh was born in Glasgow on 19 August 1980 to a Scottish mother, Avril Campbell, and an Iranian father, Booth Danesh (Persian: بوته دانش); his family live in Bearsden. He was the eldest of three boys. He attended Bearsden Primary School and the Glasgow Academy, before going on to study English Literature and Philosophy at the University of Edinburgh.

== Career ==
=== 2001–2004: Pop Idol and Dive In ===
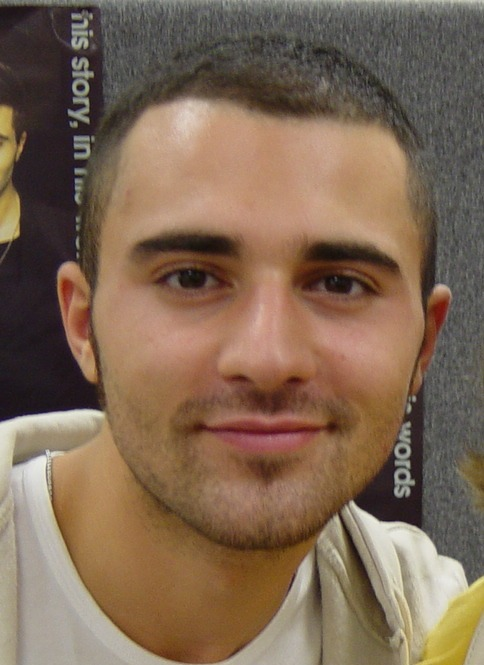
Campbell Danesh in 2003

Danesh's professional career began with a non-singing role in the Scottish Opera's avant garde 1990s production of The Trojans. As a teenager, he then performed at Covent Garden Royal Opera House with the Scottish Opera in a production of Carmen.

As Darius Danesh, he first gained fame in 2001 after appearing on the British talent competition Popstars. A year later he was voted to the finals of the TV talent show, Pop Idol. He turned down Simon Cowell's record deal, then signed with producer Steve Lillywhite. In an interview to Daily Record, he said that he had not decided to drop the Campbell from his name, and that all was decided for him and that he should go by the name Darius Danesh.

The first single written by Danesh, "Colourblind", was released on 29 July 2002 and entered the UK singles chart at number 1, staying at the top of the charts for two weeks; it was certified silver. It became certified gold on 1 May 2020. His debut album, Dive In, was certified platinum in the UK in 2004, charting at number 6 on the UK Albums Chart during the competitive pre-Christmas sales period. He subsequently had five UK top ten singles.

He wrote all 12 songs on the Dive In album, and produced one of the tracks, "Better Than That", whilst collaborating with a number of other producers, such as The Misfits and The Matrix on the other tracks. Steve Lillywhite was executive producer on the album. Danesh, then performing as Darius Danesh, supported Shakira on her world tour and went on to complete his own sell-out UK Dive In tour.

The Dive In tour took place in April and May 2003. The fifteen dates scheduled for May expanded to twenty three dates on public demand.

=== 2004–2008: Live Twice and other ventures ===
His book Sink or Swim, about the perils of the music business, was a Sunday Times best seller. He contributed to the War Child charity album with Coldplay and Oasis. He also headlined in India with Alanis Morissette. After receiving news that his father was diagnosed with terminal cancer, he wrote and dedicated his second studio album Live Twice to Dr Booth Danesh, who later recovered. In 2005, the album's title-track Live Twice became his fifth top ten single.

Danesh had two West End runs in Chicago during 2005–2006, and at 25, became the youngest actor to fill the role of Billy Flynn since the show first opened on Broadway in 1975. In 2007, after seeing Ewan McGregor in the role, he played the lead in Michael Grandage's Olivier Award-winning production of Guys and Dolls, starring as Sky Masterson. Later that year, he reprised his role of Billy Flynn for the 10th anniversary charity performance of Chicago in London, to benefit the charities Breast Cancer Haven and Breast Health Institute.

In 2008, he returned to London's West End to play Rhett Butler in Trevor Nunn's musical adaptation of Gone with the Wind.

=== 2010–2015: Popstar to Operastar and theatre ===
In January and February 2010, Danesh won the UK's ITV1 talent show Popstar to Operastar, in which eight pop stars were trained to perform famous opera arias. He was mentored by tenor Rolando Villazón, with whom he went on to duet on the song "The Impossible Dream". In May 2010 he appeared as toreador Escamillo in Bizet's opera Carmen at The O_{2} Arena in London. At the age of 29, he assumed the lead role of Carmen's lover. The same year, he starred in The History of the Big Bands tour, a show about the Big Band and Swing Era, featuring the songs of Frank Sinatra and the music of the key musicians of the big band era, including music from Harry James, Benny Goodman, Tommy Dorsey, Duke Ellington, Glenn Miller, Count Basie, Woody Herman and Buddy Rich.

In 2013 Danesh played the lead role of Warden in the show From Here to Eternity the Musical.

=== 2015–2017: Funny Girl and other theatre ===
Danesh played Nick Arnstein in Funny Girl at the Savoy Theatre in the West End, following a transfer from the Menier Chocolate Factory in April 2016.. In 2017 he played Billy Flynn in the touring production of Chicago

=== 2016-2022 Movie Producer and final works ===
In 2016 he co-executive produced the 2016 thriller Imperium starring Daniel Radcliffe. In 2018 he co-produced Tomorrow starring Sebastian Street, and the documentary Fountain of Youth. In 2022 he was executive producer on the horror movie House Red starring Natasha Henstridge

== Other work ==
=== Television ===
In 2003, Danesh appeared as himself in an episode of the Channel 4 soap Hollyoaks, performing "Girl in the Moon" at a graduation ball. In 2009, he guest starred on the BBC show Hotel Babylon as Gennaro Fazio, an Italian magazine editor.

=== Charity ===
Danesh was an ambassador for The Prince's Trust, helping underprivileged youth. He designed a guitar for Guitar Aid. He worked with and supported the Lymphoma Association and Cancer Research UK, in addition to other cancer charities.

== Personal life ==
In 2010, Danesh was seriously injured in a car crash in Spain, which left him with chronic neck pain. He declined surgery because there was a risk it would affect his vocal cords.

In 2015 Danesh nearly died after contracting bacterial meningitis and cerebral oedema (swelling of the brain), causing him to collapse and fall into a coma. He was bed bound for 3 months. The incident happened while filming a promotional video for water aid charity Fresh2Go, He unknowingly used contaminated water from an unfiltered prototype display model instead of the filtered water.

Danesh married Canadian actress Natasha Henstridge in February 2011. They filed for divorce in July 2013. The divorce was finalised in February 2018.

== Death ==
Campbell Danesh was found unresponsive on 11 August 2022 in his apartment in Rochester, Minnesota, United States, and he was pronounced dead later that day. His family reported there were no suspicious circumstances or signs of intent surrounding his death. A private funeral was held on 25 August 2022 at a church in the Glasgow suburb of Bearsden, attended by family members and close friends.

A postmortem report, released on 10 September 2022, concluded that Danesh died from inhalation of chloroethane, which led to respiratory arrest. He used chloroethane in addition to physiotherapy to treat his neck pain. His death was ruled accidental. Danesh had suffered from chronic pain since his car accident in 2010.

Tributes were paid by his close friend Gerard Butler and others who had worked closely with Danesh, including Simon Cowell, Gareth Gates, Will Young and Ant & Dec. Eight days after his death, his debut single "Colourblind" charted at number two on both the UK Official Singles Download and Sales charts.

== Discography ==
- Dive In (2002)
- Live Twice (2004)

== Theatre ==
Year	Title	Role	Venue
2005–2006	Chicago	Billy Flynn	Adelphi Theatre
2007	Guys and Dolls	Sky Masterson	Piccadilly Theatre
2008	Gone with the Wind	Rhett Butler	New London Theatre
2011	Chicago	Billy Flynn	Garrick Theatre
2013–2014	From Here to Eternity	Sergeant Milt Warden	Shaftesbury Theatre
2015–2016	Funny Girl	Nick Arnstein	Menier Chocolate Factory

== Books ==
- Darius: Sink or Swim, My Story. Headline Publishing Group. 2003. ISBN 0-7553-1281-3.

Preceded by None	Winner of Popstar to Operastar; 2010	Succeeded by Joe McElderry
