= That's Me (album) =

That's Me - The Greatest Hits

Greatest hits album by Agnetha Fältskog
- Released: 3 June 1998
- Recorded: 1976–1987
- Genre: Pop
- Length: 63:13 (standard version); 74:04 (bonus track version)
- Label: Polar; Polydor
- Producer: Mike Chapman; Peter Cetera; Benny Andersson; Björn Ulvaeus; Anders Hansson; Ola Håkansson; Tim Norell; Rutger Gunnarsson; Eric Stewart; Lennart Östlund; Tomas Ledin; Agnetha Fältskog; Michael B. Tretow

Agnetha Fältskog chronology
Agnetha Fältskogs svensktoppar (1998)	That's Me - The Greatest Hits (1998)	My Colouring Book (2004)

Singles from That’s Me
- 1. "The Queen Of Hearts" Released: 1998

That's Me - The Greatest Hits is the first English-language greatest hits album by Swedish singer Agnetha Fältskog, who is most well-known as a member of ABBA. It was released on 3 June 1998 via Polar Music and Polydor Records. The compilation is named after ABBA's 1977 single "That's Me". It is a companion album to Fältskog's 1996 compilation My Love, My Life, which focuses on her Swedish-language work.

The compilation features primarily solo hits by Fältskog, but also includes some of her songs with ABBA, and a then-recently discovered 1981 demo of "The Queen of Hearts", an English-language version of her Swedish-language song "När du tar mig i din famn". The version of "It's So Nice to Be Rich" included on this album is actually a previously unreleased edit in mono sourced from the film P&B, as the stereo master tape seems to have been lost.

The album was elected by Fred Bronson from Billboard as the eighth best album of 1998, and William Ruhlmann from AllMusic gave the album four of five stars in his review.

== Track listing ==
That's Me - The Greatest Hits track listing
No.	Title	Writer(s)	Original album(s)	Length
1.	"The Heat Is On"	Florrie Palmer; Tony Ashton	Wrap Your Arms Around Me	3:52
2.	"The Last Time"	Robin Randall; Judithe Randall; Jeff Law	I Stand Alone	4:14
3.	"Let It Shine"	Austin Roberts; Beckie Foster; Bill Labounty	I Stand Alone	3:58
4.	"The Winner Takes It All" (with ABBA)	Benny Andersson; Björn Ulvaeus	Super Trouper	4:56
5.	"I Wasn't the One (Who Said Goodbye)" (duet with Peter Cetera)	Mark Mueller; Aaron Zigman	I Stand Alone	4:09
6.	"The Way You Are" (Edit, duet with Ola Håkansson)	Norell Oson Bard	Standalone single	3:47
7.	"It's So Nice to Be Rich"	Gunnar Svensson; Hans Alfredson	P&B (Original Soundtrack)	3:14
8.	"I Won't Let You Go"	Agnetha Fältskog; Eric Stewart	Eyes of a Woman	3:38
9.	"Never Again" (duet with Tomas Ledin)	Tomas Ledin	The Human Touch	3:53
10.	"Eyes of a Woman"	Paris Edvinson; Marianne Flynner	Eyes of a Woman	3:55
11.	"Slipping Through My Fingers" (with ABBA)	Andersson; Ulvaeus	The Visitors	3:54
12.	"One Way Love"	Jeff Lynne	Eyes of a Woman	3:35
13.	"Can't Shake Loose"	Russ Ballard	Wrap Your Arms Around Me	4:20
14.	"Wrap Your Arms Around Me"	Mike Chapman; Holly Knight	Wrap Your Arms Around Me	5:12
15.	"The Queen of Hearts"	Fältskog; Ingela Forsman	Previously unreleased	3:21
16.	"That's Me" (with ABBA)	Andersson; Ulvaeus	Arrival	3:15
Total length:				63:13

Bonus track version
No.	Title	Writer(s)	Original album	Length
17.	"Turn the World Around"	Randy Edelman	B-side to "One Way Love"	4:17
18.	"You're There"	Fältskog; Stewart	B-side to "I Won't Let You Go"	3:29
19.	"Fly Like the Eagle"	Norell Oson Bard	B-side to "The Way You Are"	3:05
Total length:				74:04
