= My Love, My Life (album) =

Compilation album by Agnetha Fältskog
- Released: 13 September 1996
- Recorded: 1968–1987
- Genre: Pop
- Length: 167:22
- Label: Columbia
- Producer: various

Agnetha Fältskog chronology
| I Stand Alone (1987) | My Love, My Life (1996) | Agnetha Fältskogs svensktoppar (1998) |

My Love, My Life is a compilation album released by Agnetha Fältskog, a former member of Swedish pop group ABBA, in 1996. The album is named after the ABBA song "My Love, My Life".

The two-disc set primarily features Swedish-language songs recorded by Fältskog, but it also contains a few songs recorded in English, including some of her favourite ABBA songs, such as "My Love, My Life" and "The Winner Takes It All". Complementing this album is the 1998 compilation That's Me, which concentrates on Agnetha's English-language hits.

== Track listing ==
=== Main track ===
Disc one
| No. | Title | Length |
|---|---|---|
| 1. | "Introduktion" | 4:59 |
| 2. | "Jag var så kär" | 3:19 |
| 3. | "Utan dej, mitt liv går vidare" | 2:49 |
| 4. | "Sonny Boy" | 2:36 |
| 5. | "Allting har förändrat sig" | 3:13 |
| 6. | "En gång fanns bara vi två" | 2:40 |
| 7. | "Så här börjar Kärlek" | 2:35 |
| 8. | "Om tårar vore guld" | 3:30 |
| 9. | "En sång och en saga" | 3:41 |
| 10. | "Jag ska göra allt" | 3:49 |
| 11. | "Tänk va' skönt" | 3:22 |
| 12. | "Många gånger än" | 3:39 |
| 13. | "Tågen kan gå igen" | 3:05 |
| 14. | "Jag ska inte fälla några tårar" | 2:02 |
| 15. | "Dröm är dröm och saga saga" | 3:28 |
| 16. | "Kanske var min kind lite het" | 3:10 |
| 17. | "Vart skall min kärlek föra?" | 3:21 |
| 18. | "Så glad som dina ögon" | 3:01 |
| 19. | "Tio mil kvar till Korpilombolo" | 2:59 |

Disc two
| No. | Title | Length |
|---|---|---|
| 20. | "En sång om sorg och glädje" | 3:49 |
| 21. | "SOS" | 3:21 |
| 22. | "Dom har glömt" | 3:43 |
| 23. | "Visa i åttonde månaden" | 3:56 |
| 24. | "Tack för en underbar vanlig dag" | 2:40 |
| 25. | "När du tar mej i din famn" | 4:09 |
| 26. | "Disillusion" | 3:06 |
| 27. | "My Love, My Life" | 3:53 |
| 28. | "The Winner Takes It All" | 4:55 |
| 29. | "Never Again" | 3:55 |
| 30. | "The Day Before You Came" | 5:46 |
| 31. | "Wrap Your Arms Around Me" | 5:15 |
| 32. | "It's So Nice To Be Rich" | 3:14 |
| 33. | "I Won't Let You Go" | 3:40 |
| 34. | "The Way You Are" | 4:11 |
| 35. | "Let It Shine" | 3:56 |
| 36. | "Nu tändas tusen juleljus" | 2:38 |
| 37. | "På söndag" | 2:31 |

Source: (disc one and two)

=== Bonus CD ===
The bonus CD was only available for a short time in Sweden.

Bonus CD
| No. | Title | Length |
|---|---|---|
| 1. | "När jag var fem" | 3:09 |
| 2. | "Hjärtats saga" | 2:18 |
| 3. | "Sov gott min lilla vän" | 2:44 |
| 4. | "Ta det bara med ro" | 2:10 |
| 5. | "Då finns du hos mig" | 2:30 |
| 6. | "Kungens vaktparad" | 2:40 |
| 7. | "Nya ord" | 2:13 |
| 8. | "Sången föder dig tillbaka" | 3:13 |
| 9. | "En egen trädgård" | 2:35 |
| 10. | "Doktorn!" | 2:51 |
| 11. | "Och han väntar på mig" | 3:03 |
| 12. | "I Wasn't The One" | 4:10 |
| 13. | "Någonting händer med mig" | 2:38 |
| 14. | "Mössens julafton" | 2:25 |
| 15. | "Tre vita råttor" | 2:46 |

== Charts ==
Weekly chart performance for My Love, My Life
| Chart (1996) | Peak position |
|---|---|
| Swedish Albums (Sverigetopplistan) | 21 |
