= När du tar mig i din famn =

"När Du Tar Mej I Din Famn"

Single by Agnetha Fältskog

from the album Tio år med Agnetha
- Language: Swedish
- B-side: "Jag Var Så Kär"
- Released: October 1979
- Genre: Pop
- Length: 4:08
- Label: Cupol
- Songwriter(s): Ingela Forsman

Agnetha Fältskog singles chronology
"SOS" (1975)	"När Du Tar Mej I Din Famn" (1979)	"Never Again" (1982)

"När du tar mig i din famn" (When You Take Me in Your Arms) is a song composed by Agnetha Fältskog, and lyrics by Ingela Forsman, and originally recorded by Agnetha Fältskog for her 1979 compilation album Tio år med Agnetha, released on CBS Cupol, as well as released as a single in April the same year. It charted at Svensktoppen for 10 weeks between 10 November 1979 – 27 January 1980, a stay which included the song topping the chart.

In 1981, Agnetha Fältskog recorded a demo version in English, entitled "The Queen of Hearts". In 1998, it was released as a single to promote the compilation album That's Me from the same year. The single peaked at #53 in the Swedish Singles Chart.

"The Queen of Hearts"

Single by Agnetha Fältskog

from the album That's Me
- B-side: "One Way Love"; "I Won't Let You Go"; "Eyes of a Woman"
- Released: 1998
- Recorded: 1981
- Genre: Europop, Pop
- Length: 3:20 (Album Version); 3:32 (Remixed Version)
- Label: Polar Music/Universal Music
- Songwriter(s): Agnetha Fältskog, Ingela Forsman
- Producer(s): Agnetha Fältskog, Michael B. Tretow

Agnetha Fältskog singles chronology
"Let It Shine" (1988)	"The Queen of Hearts" (1998)	"If I Thought You'd Ever Change Your Mind" (2004)

"The Queen of Hearts" was therefore licensed from Sony Music Entertainment Sweden, which had since acquired CBS Cupol, for the 1998 single release by Polar Music.

The promo single release included only the single track. One commercial release also included the song "Eyes of a Woman" from the 1985 album of the same name, and another single release included those two tracks as well as the songs "One Way Love" and "I Won't Let You Go," also from the album Eyes of a Woman.

== Charts ==
Chart (1998)	Peak position
Sweden (Sverigetopplistan)	53

== Other recordings ==
The song was covered by Matz Bladhs on the 1990 album Leende dansmusik 90 and Wizex on the 1990 album Spanska ögon. In 1997, the song was recorded by Lotta Engbergs on the album Tolv i topp while in 2008, it was recorded by Drifters on the album Tycker om dig: Svängiga låtar från förr

Getty Kaspers, former lead vocalist of the Dutch band and fellow Eurovision winners Teach-In, recorded a version of the song in Dutch, titled "De Eerste Liefde Is Een Feest" (The first love is a feast).

Vietnamese singer Mỹ Tâm recorded Hãy Tha Thứ Cho em (Please forgive me).
