= The Way You Are (Fältskog and Håkansson song) =

Single by Agnetha Fältskog & Ola Håkansson
- B-side: "Fly Like the Eagle"
- Released: November 10, 1986
- Recorded: Sonet Studios, Sweden, 1986
- Genre: Europop, pop
- Length: 4:05
- Label: Sonet Grammofon
- Songwriter(s): Norell Oson Bard
- Producer(s): Anders Hansson, Ola Håkansson, Tim Norell

Agnetha Fältskog singles chronology
"One Way Love" (1985)	"The Way You Are" (1986)	"The Last Time" (1987)

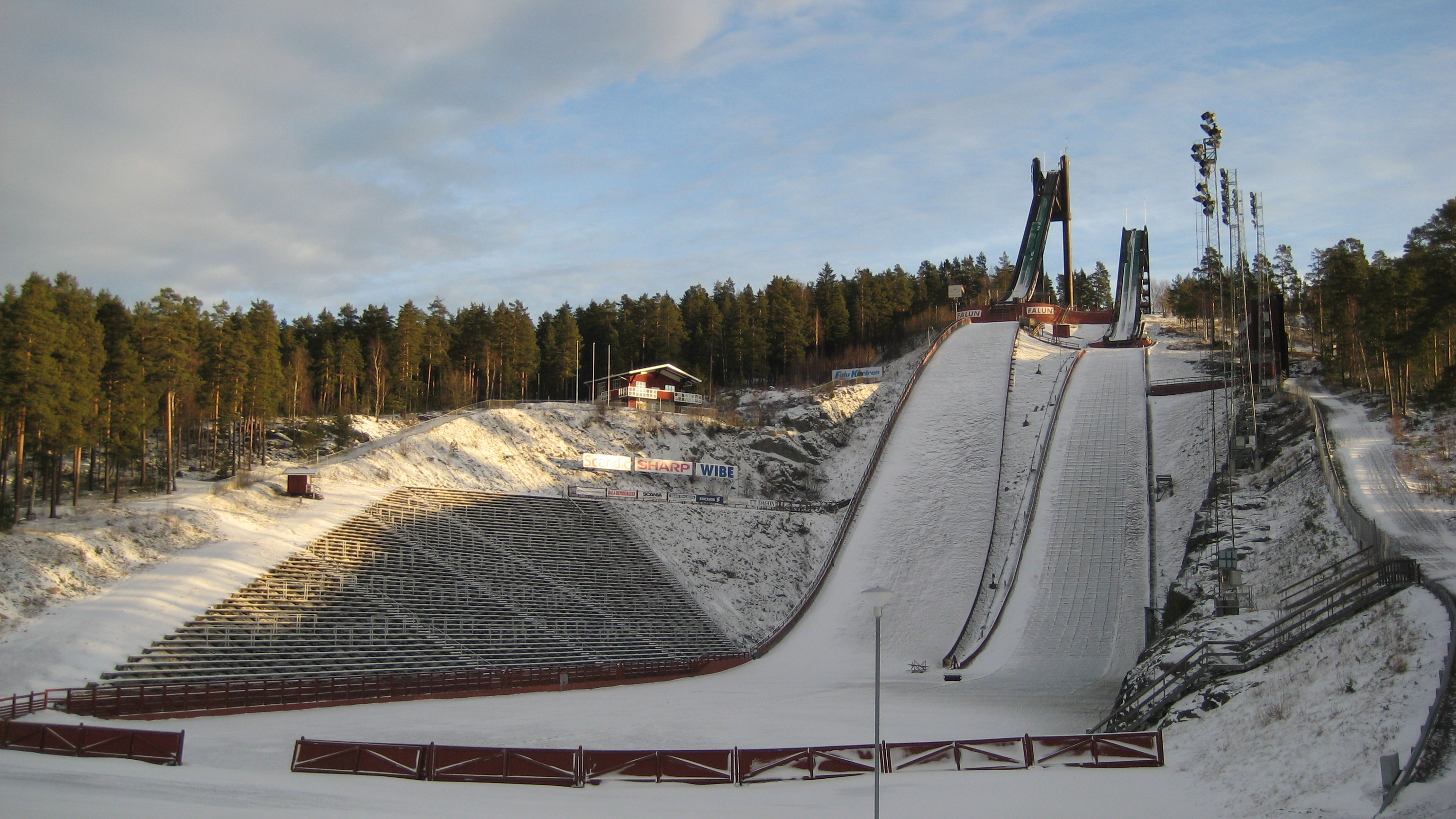
The song was used by Falun applying for the 1992 Olympic Winter Games.

"The Way You Are" is a pop song that was recorded by Agnetha Fältskog and Ola Håkansson of the band Secret Service in 1986. The song was used to promote Falun, Sweden as a candidate for hosting the 1992 Olympic Winter Games. Falun was not selected to host the Games, but the song became a big hit in Sweden.

The song on the B-side, "Fly Like the Eagle", was also a duet by Fältskog and Håkansson. Both songs were featured in the documentary It's Time for Sweden.

The single reached No. 1 in Sweden, but was not successful in the rest of the world. Though outside Sweden, The Way You Are received extensive airplay by FM stations at least in Brazil, during the 1987-89 period, as it can still be seen by the numerous blogs and websites in that country displaying either translations or links to direct streaming of that song.

== Song versions ==
Version	Length	Released on
Single Version	4:05	"The Way You Are", 7" and 12" vinyl
Single Version	4:05	My Love My Life - Agnetha Fältskog
Single Version	4:05	The Very Best of Secret Service - Secret Service
Instrumental Version	4:05	"The Way You Are", 12" vinyl
Edited Alternate Mix	3:47	That's Me - The Greatest Hits - Agnetha Fältskog
Edited Alternate Mix	3:47	Eyes of a Woman (2005 Remaster) - Agnetha Fältskog
12" Extended Version	6:33	"The Way You Are", 12" vinyl
Extended Version	5:47	Aux Deux Magots - Secret Service

== Track listings ==
7" vinyl

1. "The Way You Are" (4:10)
2. "Fly Like the Eagle" (3:06)

12" vinyl

1. "The Way You Are" (Extended Version) (6:32)
2. "The Way You Are" (Instrumental Version) (4:07)
3. "The Way You Are" (7" Version) (4:07)

== Charts ==
Chart (1986)	Peak position
Sweden (Sverigetopplistan)	1
