= It's So Nice to Be Rich =

Single by Agnetha Fältskog
- B-side: "P & B"
- Released: 1983
- Recorded: 1983
- Genre: Europop, Pop
- Length: 3:44
- Label: Polar Music
- Songwriter(s): G.Svensson/H.Alfredson
- Producer(s): Rutger Gunnarsson

Agnetha Fältskog singles chronology
| "Can't Shake Loose" (1983) | "It's So Nice to Be Rich" (1983) | "I Won't Let You Go" (1985) |

"It's So Nice to Be Rich" is a song by Swedish singer Agnetha Fältskog from the soundtrack to the 1983 Swedish film P & B, starring Stellan Skarsgård, Allan Edwall and Lill Lindfors among others. Since the song was not included on Fältskog's 1985 album Eyes of a Woman, the first time the song appeared on an album was the 1996 compilation album My Love, My Life.

== History ==
The song was written by actor and comedian Hans Alfredson and jazz musician and pianist Gunnar Svensson. It was produced and arranged by Rutger Gunnarsson, engineered by Lennart Östlund and recorded at Polar Studios in Stockholm, Sweden.

=== The single ===
"It's So Nice to Be Rich" was released as a single in Sweden in December 1983 and it reached number 8 on the Swedish singles chart in February 1984. It was the only single by Agnetha Fältskog to chart in Sweden in 1984.

=== Alternative version ===
The version of "It's So Nice To Be Rich" included on Fältskog's compilation album That's Me in 1998 is a previously unreleased edit in mono, sourced from the movie P & B, as the stereo master tape seems to be lost forever so a vinyl rip of the single was used for the 2005 remaster of Wrap Your Arms Around Me.

== Chart positions ==
| Chart (1983) | Position |
|---|---|
| Sweden (Sverigetopplistan) | 8 |
