= Agnetha Fältskogs svensktoppar =

Greatest hits album by Agnetha Fältskog
- Released: 1998
- Recorded: 1968–1979
- Genre: Pop
- Length: 39:29
- Label: Sony
- Producer: various

Agnetha Fältskog chronology
My Love, My Life (1996)	Agnetha Fältskogs svensktoppar (1998)	That's Me (1998)

Agnetha Fältskogs svensktoppar is a compilation album released in 1998 by Swedish pop singer Agnetha Fältskog, known from the Sweden pop group ABBA. The songs on the album are hits by her on the Swedish hitlist Svensktoppen.

== Track listing ==
1. "Tack för en underbar vanlig dag" – 2:39
2. "När du tar mej i din famn" – 4:12
3. "Jag var så kär" – 3:19
4. "Om tårar vore guld" – 3:29
5. "Vart skall min kärlek föra?" – 3:22
6. "En sång om sorg och glädje" – 3:48
7. "Dröm är dröm och saga saga" – 3:25
8. "Så glad som dina ögon" – 3:02
9. "En sång och en saga" – 3:41
10. "SOS" – 3:24
11. "Doktorn!" – 2:53
12. "Fram för svenska sommaren" – 2:25
13. "Allting har förändrat sej" – 3:12
14. "Utan dej, mitt liv går vidare" – 2:49
15. "Zigenarvän" – 2:58
16. "Många gånger än" – 2:38
17. "Sången föder dig tillbaka" – 3:13
