= Getty Kaspers =

Dutch singer

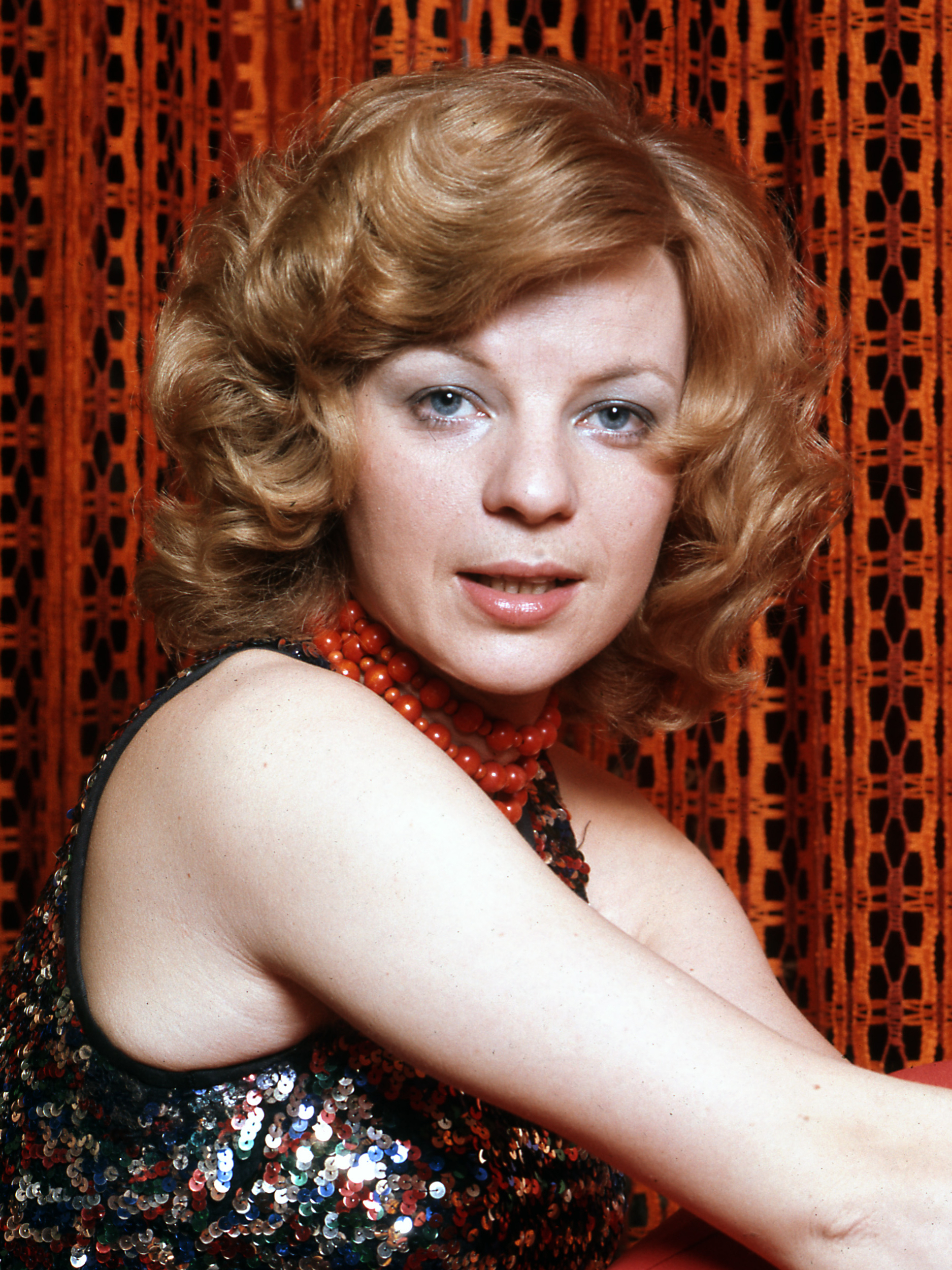
- Kaspers, ca. 1975

Background information
- Born: Gertrude Kaspers; 5 March 1948 (age 78); Graz, Styria, Austria
- Origin: Netherlands
- Genres: Pop
- Occupations: Singer; Songwriter
- Instrument: Vocals
- Years active: 1971–75; 1976–present
- Labels: CBS; CNR; EMI; RCA; CNR; Philips; A&R

Gertrude "Getty" Kaspers (born 5 March 1948) is an Austrian-born Dutch singer. She was the lead vocalist of the Dutch band Teach-In, with whom she won the Eurovision Song Contest 1975 with the song "Ding-a-dong".

== Career ==
=== Early career ===
Kaspers joined the band Teach-In in 1971. In 1974, the band had three Top 15 hits in the Netherlands. The band also had a number of international successes. One of these, "In The Summernight", reached number 5 in South Africa for 13 weeks, and also peaked at number 3 in the Dutch and Belgian charts for 10 and 9 weeks respectively.

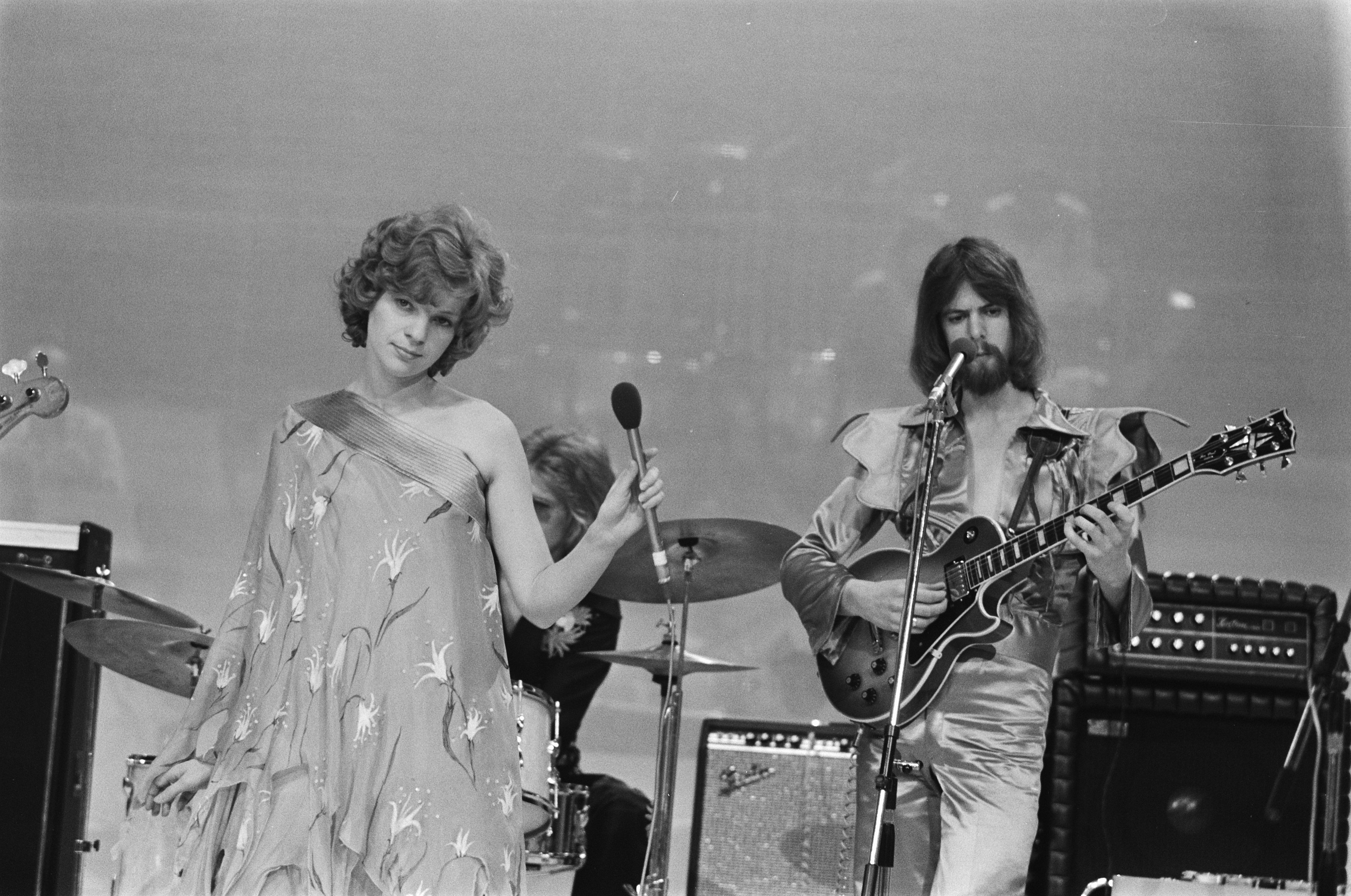
Kaspers with Teach-In at the 1975 Nationaal Songfestival

=== Eurovision Song Contest ===
Teach-In participated in the Nationaal Songfestival 1975, the Dutch national final for the Eurovision Song Contest 1975. The competition was held in the Jaarbeurs convention centre in Utrecht, and for the first time since 1970, the act had not been preselected by broadcaster NOS, but was selected in a two-stage process. Teach-In were required to perform their song "Ding-a-dong" in the first round to select the song that would represent the Netherlands. A five-member international jury selected the winning song by four votes to one, over the songs "Ik heb geen geld voor de trein" from Albert West and "Circus" from Debbie (Dutch versions of Teach-In songs "Tennessee Town" and "The Circus Show").

With the song "Ding-a-dong" winning the first round, all three performers were required to sing this song in the second round to decide the winning artist. The choice was made by a public vote, which resulted in Teach-In winning the Nationaal Songfestival with 56 points, compared to 33 points for Albert West and 11 points for Debbie.

As the lead vocalist of Teach-In, Kaspers opened the Eurovision Song Contest 1975 held in Stockholm, Sweden, and the group went on to win the contest with 152 points.

After their Eurovision victory, the band entered the charts in nearly every European country. "Ding-a-dong" reached third place in the Top 40 of the National Hit Parade in the Netherlands and reached place thirteen in the British charts. Later that year Teach-In released the single "Goodbye Love", which also made the Top 10, peaking at number 5 for seven weeks.

In 1976, Kaspers returned to the Eurovision Song Contest to give Brotherhood of Man, the winners of the 1976 contest, their prizes.

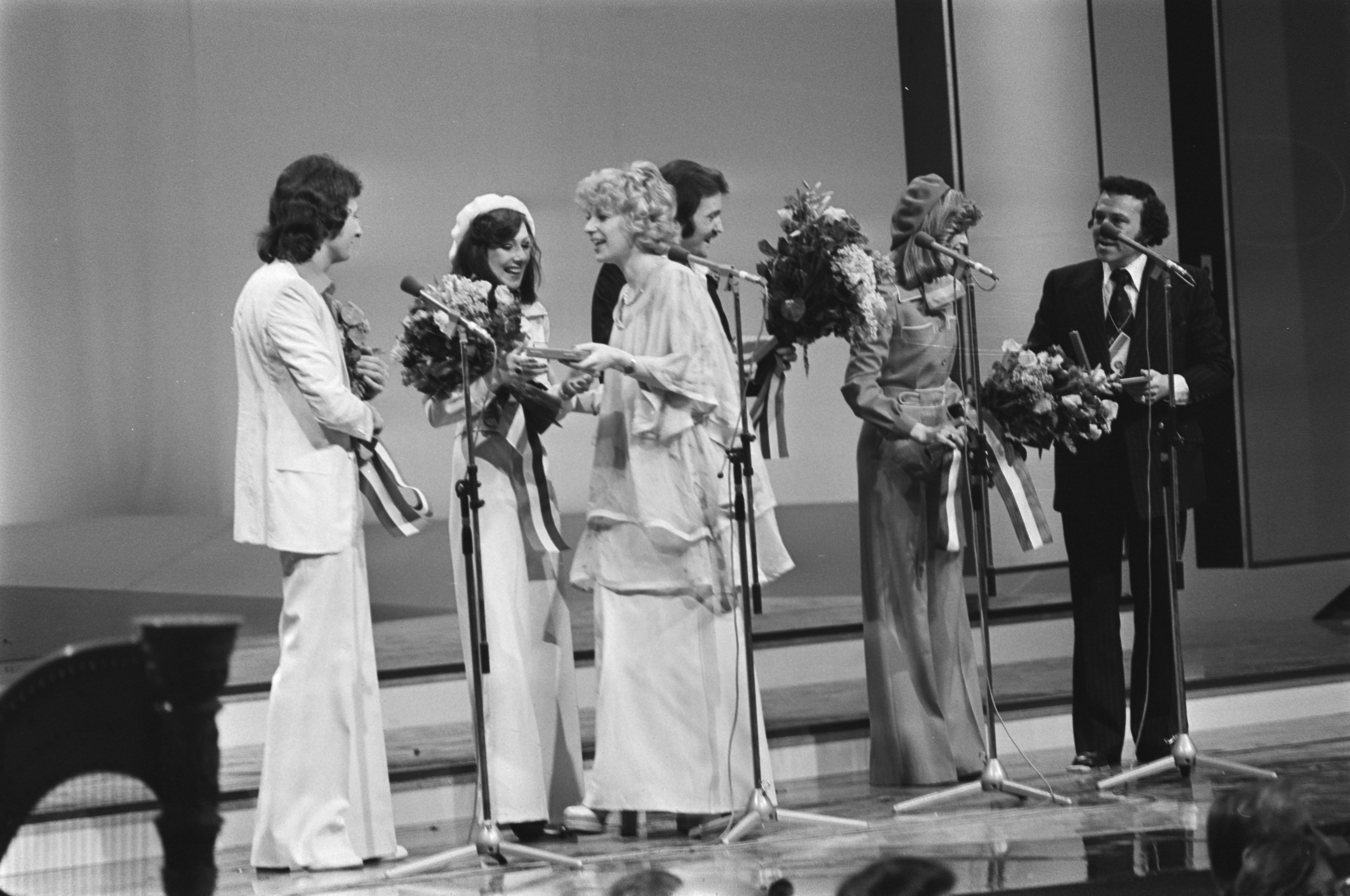
Kaspers presenting the prizes to Brotherhood of Man upon their winning the 1976 Eurovision Song Contest

=== Solo career ===
Teach-In toured Europe for the next two years, but the disappointing sales of the album "Get On Board" and the song "Rose Valley" caused the band to break up in 1978. Ruud Nijhuis and Koos Versteeg decided to reform the band in 1979 with two new female singers, but Kaspers decided to continue her music career as a solo artist under the stage name Getty, recording a couple of discs including the Getty Album, featuring such songs as "Mademoiselle", "Love Me" and "De Eerste Liefde is Een Feest", originally "The Queen of Hearts" by Agnetha Fältskog in Swedish and English. Her vocals can also be heard on Rick van der Linden's "Cum Laude" album and on recordings made by Radio Veronica.

In 1978, she joined her bandmate John Gaasbeek with Wilma van Diepen and formed the Balloon trio, recording a few songs such as "All You Need Is The Music" and "Summerparty", featuring cameos of well known songs. After little success, the trio broke apart in 1980.

=== Later appearances and Teach-In revival ===
Kaspers was present as a jury member in the 1978, 1982 and 2009 Dutch national finals for the Eurovision Song Contest. She also featured in the 2005 Eurovision documentary "Tour d'Eurovision", highlighting some of the best performances of Eurovision.

In 1997, it was announced that the original line-up of Teach-In, including Kaspers, had re-recorded some of their old hits and had plans to tour again. The band reunited to sing "Ding-a-dong" at a show in Maastricht on 31 August 2007. Kaspers also performed with the group in the original line-up at the opening of the 2009 Eurovision Song Contest in Moscow, singing classics such as "Ding-a-dong" and "I'm Alone".

In 2009, Teach-In re-released a combined album titled "Festival/Get On Board". The following year, the band released the "Best Of Teach-In" album, featuring their greatest hits.

Kaspers was present at the 2012 Dutch national final for the Eurovision Song Contest.

== Personal life ==
Kaspers was born on 5 March 1948 in Graz, Austria, to a Dutch mother and an Austrian father. She is fluent in English, Dutch and German. Her husband died of ALS in 2011.

In April 2019, Luitingh-Sijthoff published a book, "Een leven lang geleden", about Kaspers' life. It tells of how her youth was dominated by the aftermath of World War II, and of the many ups and downs of her life after the success of "Dinge-dong". It was written by Dave Boomkens, a Dutch writer who is known for books such as "Liesbeth List, de dochter van de vuurtorenwachter" and "Het Grote Songfestivalboek".

== Discography ==
=== Singles ===
Songs in the Dutch Charts	Year of Appearance	Chart Position	Date of Entry	Label	Composer	Notes
"Love Me"	1976	Top 40 (5 weeks)	11/11/1976	CNR	J. Gaasbeek, B. Baarslag	
"I Am Ready"	1976			CNR	D. McRonald, Dunhills	B-Side to 'Love M'
"Mademoiselle (Mais Oui Je T'aime)"	1977	Top 40 (4 weeks)	23/4/1977	CNR	Dunhills, Mc. Ronald	
"Believe Me"	1977			CNR	J. Gaasbeek, B. Baarslag	B-Side to 'Mademoiselle'
"Shelter Me"	1977	Top 40 (3 weeks)	22/10/1977	CNR	Dave Paul, Duncan Mackellar	
"Fly With Me"	1977			CNR	B. Baarslag, J. Gaasbeek	B-Side to 'Shelter Me'
"I'm Alone"	1977	Top 40 (3 weeks)	21/1/1978	CNR	D. Mc. Ronald, H. Waltheim, F. Rothman	Artist listed as 'Getty and Teach-In'
"Ik Wil Je Liever Niet Weer Zien"	1982			Philips	Cath. Courage, H. P. de Boer	
"Voor Jou, Voor Mij"	1982			Philips	Ouwens, Stolk, G. den Braber	B-Side to "Ik Wil Je Liever Niet Weer Zien"
"Madam"	1982			A&R	Cath. Courage, G. den Braber	
"Weet Je Nog Wel"	1982			A&R	Ouwens, Stolk, Waltheim	B-Side to 'Madam'
"Vive Le Festival"	1989			Corduroy	Kaspers	Instrumental also released
"Enschedé (C'est La Vie)"	2009			Vinylparadijs	P. Paljet, T. Minor, L. Post	
Kom Je Kijken (Papertown)	2009			Vinylparadijs	Östlund, H. Barter, R. Barter, J. Twigt	
"Jan Fortuin"	2010			Vinylparadijs	F. Gaasbeek	
"Manolito"	2010			Vinylparadijs	H. Stott, H. P. De Boer, E. Ouwens	

=== Albums ===
Album(s) in the Dutch Charts	Year of Appearance	Chart Position	Date of Entry	Label	Notes
"Getty"	1982			CBS	

== See also ==
- Teach-In
- Netherlands in the Eurovision Song Contest
