= Wrap Your Arms Around Me =

- Original vinyl cover (Some CD versions have minor differences)

Studio album by Agnetha Fältskog
- Released: 30 May 1983
- Recorded: 20 January – March 1983
- Studio: Polar Music Studios (Stockholm)
- Genres: Pop; europop; rock
- Length: 46:20
- Label: Polar
- Producer: Mike Chapman

Agnetha Fältskog chronology
Nu tändas tusen juleljus (1981)	Wrap Your Arms Around Me (1983)	Eyes of a Woman (1985)

Singles from Wrap Your Arms Around Me
- 1. "The Heat Is On" Released: 3 May 1983; 2. "Wrap Your Arms Around Me" Released: 22 July 1983; 3. "Can't Shake Loose" Released: 13 August 1983; 4. "Man" Released: 1983 (SA)

Wrap Your Arms Around Me is the seventh studio album, and first English-language album, by Swedish singer and ABBA member Agnetha Fältskog, first released on 30 May 1983 by Polar Music Records, and 8 August in North America, by Polydor Records. Following the break-up of ABBA in late 1982, she met with record producer Mike Chapman in London, known for his work with Blondie. He began collaborating with Fältskog to take role by coming up with the album title and produced it thereafter. The recording for Wrap Your Arms Around Me took place at Polar Music Studios in Stockholm, Sweden, where Fältskog collaborated with songwriters and studio musicians who previously worked with ABBA to complete the album within three months.

The album marked a significant step in Fältskog's solo career, resulting in a shift in musical style from the pop-oriented sound of ABBA to a more adult contemporary and soft rock aesthetic that established Fältskog's conventional sound following her later solo albums until I Stand Alone. Wrap Your Arms Around Me showcases a ballad-tempo driven by an energetic, introspective sensibility of dance, incorporating various forms of pop, post-disco, europop, synth-pop, calypso, as well as a precursor to album-oriented rock throughout the majority of the album. This eventually helped secure Fältskog's reputation as a solo artist, growing more independent from the ABBA clout. Despite limited international chart-topping success compared to ABBA, the album remains an important part of Fältskog's musical catalogue, marking a new chapter in her career. Wrap Your Arms Around Me received generally positive reviews from music critics upon its release, praising over its upbeat nature and energetic melodies, calling its pop style, with some impressed with the involvement of Chapman.

Throughout promotion, Fältskog performed the album on major television shows throughout Europe, followed by two promotional music videos. Following its release, the album became a commercial success across continental Europe, topping the charts in Sweden and Norway. However, it had only modest success overseas on the US Billboard 200 albums chart, peaking at 102. Four singles—"The Heat Is On", "Wrap Your Arms Around Me", "Can't Shake Loose", and "Man"—were released throughout various countries to promote the album. It has gone to attain sales certifications in a few countries and has sold an estimated 2.5 million copies worldwide.

== Background ==
Agnetha Fältskog, one of the members of the Swedish group ABBA, had ventures of success in Sweden with her solo career since the late 1960s, primarily containing Swedish-language lyrics. Then 17 year old Fältskog signed with a small record company, Cupol – which saw five albums being released in that particular label, with one while in the group. She had met Björn Ulvaeus in 1968, one of the members in Hootenanny Singers, along with Benny Andersson. Ulvaeus and Andersson first formed the group as "Björn & Benny" in 1970, but later became a quartet, when Andersson's partner and then-wife, Anni-Frid Lyngstad joined, while Fältskog joined at the same time. She eventually married Ulvaeus in 1971, and the four members, later named "ABBA", rose to international prominence releasing eight albums through Polar Music. Fältskog further gained attention based on her role as Mary Magdalene in Jesus Christ Superstar musical production, enabling her as an actress in the later years.

By the late '70s, ABBA's popularity grew at its peak, but the group started to show some tensions, eventually leading to the breakup of both couples. The divorce and the perceived fame had resulted Fältskog to go to a psychiatrist, realising that being "really crazy to reach that stage" while being in the group seemed "nonsense". By the end of 1982, the last leg of the promoting tour for ABBA's The Singles: The First Ten Years have been concluded in Stockholm. There was no official announcement made involving the break-up of the group, though the collapse of both marriages and inactivity have been contributed to this. Fältskog reminisced that before the group's demise, she subsequently was offered actress positions, alongside her prominent advocacy against drugs. Commenting on the breakup, Fältskog stated, "I am very proud of what ABBA achieved, but for all of us, it's time to move on... at this point, all of us are going to concentrate on our solo projects."

Each member of ABBA had already embarked on solo careers by the time the group paused its activities – while Fältskog, who remained under a recording contract with the Polar label by the group's management team, recorded a duet with Tomas Ledin's Never Again.

== Composition and production ==
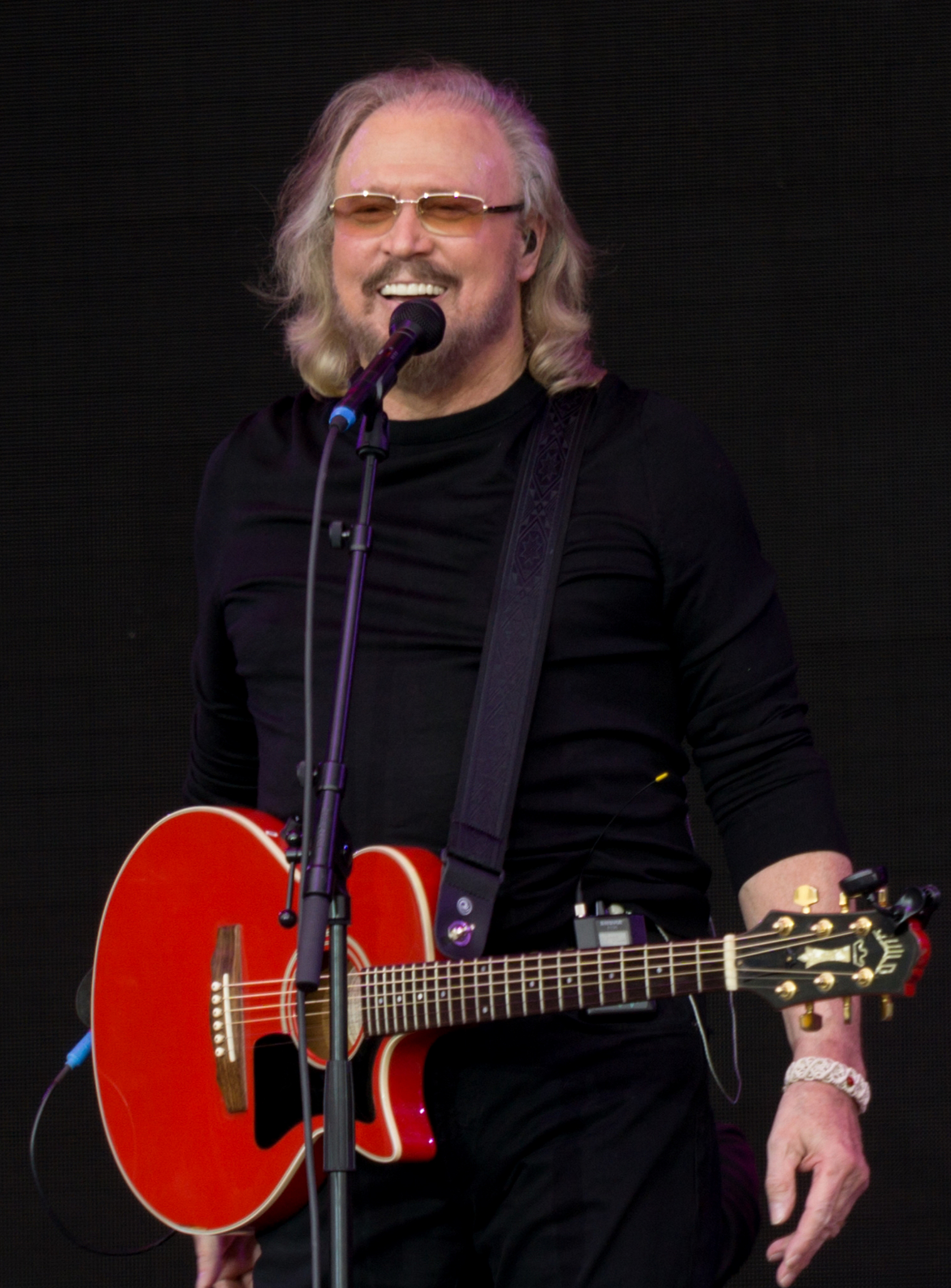
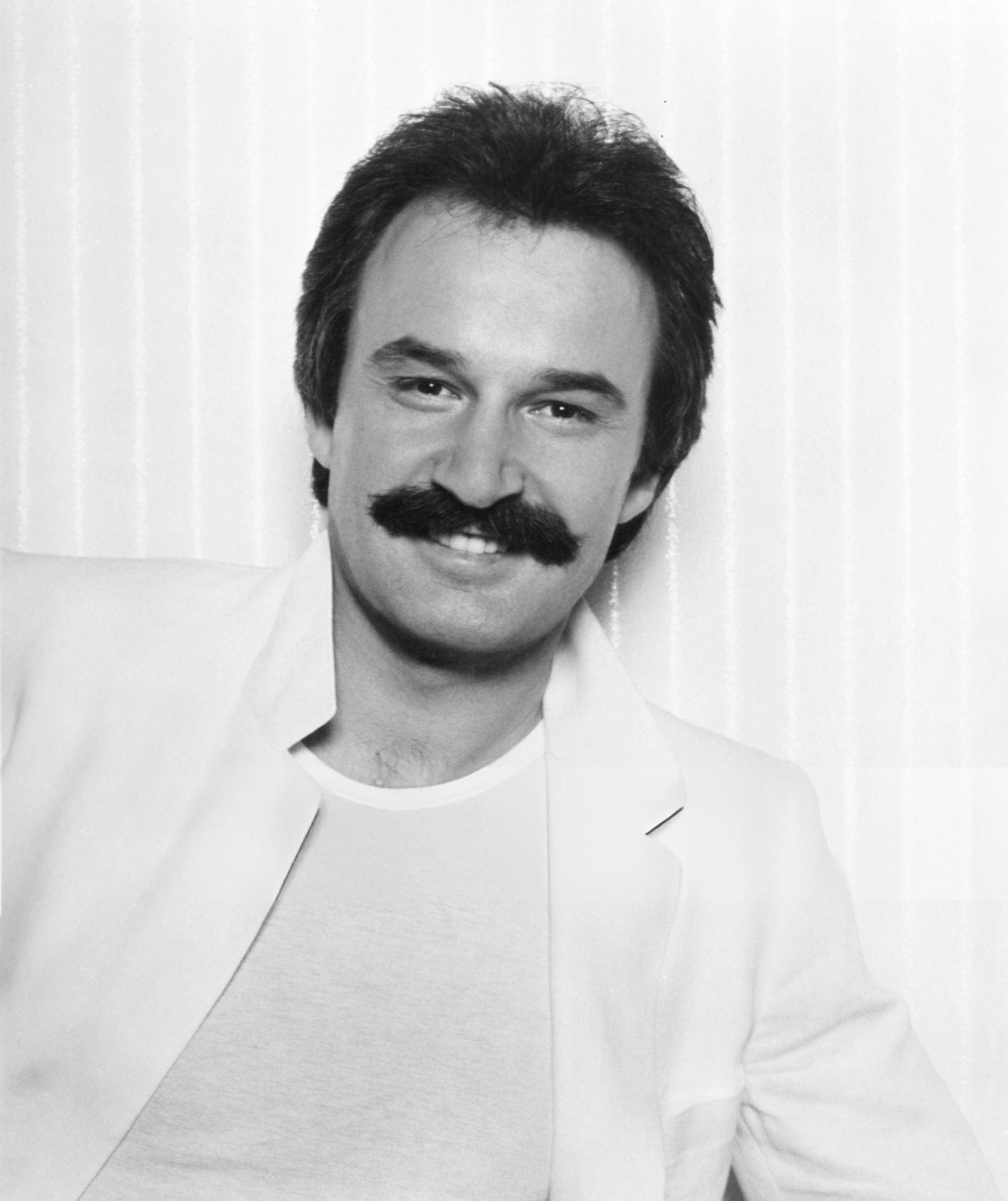
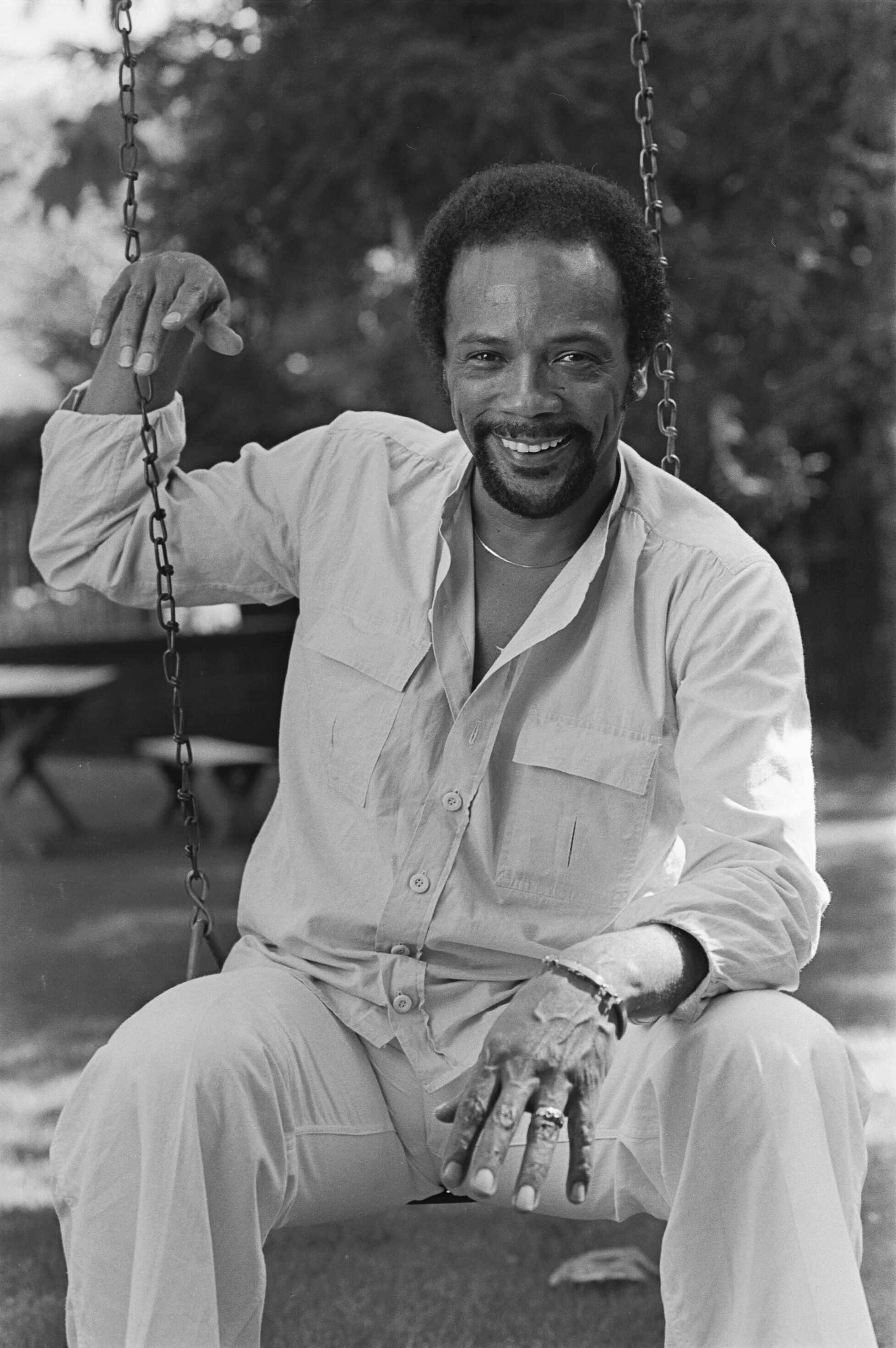
Fältskog desired to work with producers such as Barry Gibb, Giorgio Moroder and Quincy Jones.

Recordings for Wrap Your Arms Around Me were originally planned to take place at Polar Music Studios in Stockholm in mid-1982, but were postponed to late November due to her time being in need to record new songs for ABBA's upcoming compilation release.

Looking for a producer for her project, Fältskog was first heavily inspired by Barbra Streisand's Guilty (1980) album that she contacted Bee Gees singer/producer Barry Gibb as the first in line to produce her upcoming album. However, Gibb insisted on producing it in Miami, but Fältskog refused to leave Sweden at the time. Although Gibb was interested, he first had to cooperate on a film, but the interest never came to fruition. Having Gibb being sidelined with a demanding schedule for the next two years, Fältskog had been considering other producers during the process. Additionally, Fältskog desired to team up with Giorgio Moroder and Quincy Jones, which Jones had been given high honours of producing Michael Jackson's critically acclaimed Off the Wall (1979) and Thriller (1982). However, she had chosen Australian producer, Mike Chapman, who heavily worked with Blondie and Smokie. Fältskog had previously met Chapman in London, who agreed to take part in producing her album, which came during the news that Blondie already had been disbanded. Fältskog had also desired to collaborate with Rainbow in 1980 for a potential album, but the project was never conceived.

The majority of the album's writing and composition had been completed during the summer for three months. Fältskog and Chapman chose the songs from no fewer than four-hundred submitted cassettes, which she claimed that she had only listened to three-hundred of the tapes. Fältskog clarified that she "wanted to be fair" with the selection with the amount she wanted the record to be in that direction. She added, "When I chose the songs with Mike and Stig [...] we didn't look at the authors. We picked nearly the same songs—considering how we did it, it's surprising that Russ Ballard and David Clark Allen have each songs on the record." Commenting on the latter, she said:

"Mike Chapman and I both chose the same songs from that huge selection, we were on the same page from the start ... I especially wanted a record with cheerful, varied music, alternated with a more solid or romantic number. I enjoyed the freedom you enjoy as a soloist."

Eventually, the selection was narrowed down to about twenty songs, only twelve were selected. The completed compositions were created by Chapman, Russ Ballard, and Agnetha Fältskog, along with contributions from emerging composers who had yet to gain recognition. Chapman commented in an Anders Hanser film, "I knew I've been seeing her perform for many years as a member of that group. I knew she was a very capable singer, a vary capable performer. I had no problems at all and understanding her capabilities, knowing what she was going to be able to do. I knew she was a great singer. And I also knew that our personalities would get along just fine. And I think I've been proved to be right."

Following the group's presumed demise, Fältskog began working on recording in January 1983, working with longtime ABBA mixing engineer Michael B. Tretow, and concluded in March. She aimed to create her first english studio album with a distinct sound away from ABBA while recognising that her voice would remain a defining characteristic. Fältskog was particularly impressed by the band Smokie, selecting them as background vocalists for one of her singles. In addition to collaborating with Smokie, she primarily worked with Swedish musicians, many of whom were touring members who performed with ABBA throughout the group's career. Reflecting on her creative process, Fältskog explained, "Frida deviated from that. She used foreign musicians, but I didn't want that." She expressed a strong preference for collaborating with familiar individuals, stating, "I preferred to work with people I know. That makes me feel more comfortable. And Mike Chapman thought it was fine, so why not? He thought they were good enough. The album was recorded in our own Polar Studios in Stockholm. I also found that much more pleasant. I like a familiar environment." Additionally, strings were also provided by the Swedish Radio Symphony Orchestra. During recording, Fältskog listened to artists such as Michael Jackson, Hall & Oates and Donna Summer.

=== Music and lyrics ===
Overall, the musical content on Wrap Your Arms Around Me has been described as featuring "a clean, un-cluttered sound with catchy hooks" delivered with an "ample space for Faltskog's emotive vocals." The album's lead single and opening track, "The Heat Is On", was originally a cover by Noosha Fox, then was re-arranged for Manfred Mann's Earth Band's version titled as "On the Run", serves as a calypso tune under the impression to provide a "strong melody, a positive spirit". The song was described as "one of those fiercely tropical numbers so dear to the hearts of Nordics". The second track, "Can't Shake Loose," opens with instrumentation described as "toughening (sic) up the ABBA sound with hard-rock drumming," drawing comparisons to Frida's hit single "I Know There's Something Going On". "Once Burned, Twice Shy" is a soft rock "tragic ballad", incorporating elements of a breakup describing "someone who has been left and now life is so hard to live." In the song, the slide guitar tone builds a striking resemblance to Ritchie Blackmore, which is compared to Deep Purple's "Under the Gun" and Rainbow's "Lady of the Lake".

Ballard also has writing contributions to "I Wish Tonight Could Last Forever". Other composers have contributed to this extent of the album: "Shame" and "Stay" (David Clark Allen), "Once Burned, Twice Shy" (Dan Tyler and Richard "Spady" Brannan), "Mr. Persuasion" (Susan Lynch and Larry Whitman), "To Love" (Jill Brandt and Randy Goodrum) and "Stand by My Side" (Guido & Maurizio De Angelis. David Cowles). The song title was penned by Chapman and American famed songwriter, Holly Knight. "Man" was the only song on the album written by Fältskog herself, in contrast to her pre-ABBA 1960s recordings in Swedish, which were mostly self-written. She noted that, at the age of 32 or 33, she found it increasingly difficult to write her own songs, particularly when beginning with a single line and the rest, it became more challenging. "There, it's four people, and you can take just one-quarter of the credit. Of course, we're used to success at this point, and it makes you spoiled. The expectations are very, very high. But I don't mind," Fältskog stated.

== Album cover ==
English fashion photographer Gered Mankowitz shot the album cover and all the single covers based on her album. Mankowitz said of this shoot, "Agnetha was being produced by Mike Chapman who I had worked with a great deal in the 70s; and he asked me to come to Sweden, where they were recording, to shoot this cover. Agnetha was charming, very sexy, and photogenic – we had a lovely session together. When I got home to London, there was a huge bouquet of flowers waiting – a thank you from her, and a sweet and thoughtful gesture!" David Costa created the stylised cover while Lolo Murray does the makeup for the photo shoot.

In comparison, the original CD cover featured a different typeface, with the text predominantly presented in mixed uppercase letters. In contrast, the vinyl edition utilized an all-lowercase font. The 2005 reissue restored the typography to match the original font used on the vinyl release.

== Release and promotion ==
As the recording had been completed, a TV special, "The Heat Is On" had been filmed in April 1983 and was premiered on the 4 May. There, Fältskog performed new material for her upcoming release—particularly her current lead single and others. Internationally, the promotional campaign started on 6 May 1983 in the Netherlands, where she was invited to perform at the ANWB Gala which is organized to celebrate the association's centenary anniversary. Fältskog performed "The Heat Is On" and "Shame" as well as being interviewed. Fältskog was delighted with the interest the Netherlands showed in her first English-language solo album, following its release.

Wrap Your Arms Around Me was released worldwide on 30 May 1983, and 3 June in Sweden and the UK. Around July, RPM magazine reported Fältskog has signed a record contract with Polydor Records to handle the release in North America. Fältskog hoped to capture her own solo success in the United States compared to ABBA's sales in the European market. She commented to USA Today over her plan to crossover promotion in the adult contemporary and pop charts stating, "I just wanted to find a good producer, choose good songs and make a record that everyone would enjoy." The album was eventually released on 8 August 1983 in North America. At that same time, her first American single "Can't Shake Loose" had also made its debut in that region.

The album received an expanded reissue on CD on 15 August 2005, featuring five bonus tracks. The reissue features a 1984 off-album single "It's So Nice to Be Rich" and its B-side, "P&B", English and Spanish renditions of a Tomas Ledin duet, "Never Again" in addition to a special dance music mix of "The Heat Is On". On 17 June 2017, it was announced that it will be re-released on 28 July as part of a reissue collection of solo albums from the members of ABBA in 180 gram black and pink vinyl.

=== Singles ===
The album's lead single and cover, "The Heat Is On", was released on 3 May 1983, and charted for a total of 9 countries. The single peaked at number one in Sweden, becoming Fältskog's fourth and first English single to top the chart. It also peaked at the top of the charts in Norway, while it charted at number 35 in the UK. Elsewhere, it peaked at number two in the Netherlands and Belgium. The following next single and title track, "Wrap Your Arms Around Me", was released on 22 July throughout Europe (except Sweden), where it charted in seven countries, and again peaked at number one in Belgium. It also charted at number 44 in the UK. "Can't Shake Loose" was released on 13 August as her debut single the US and proved to be more successful in North America, debuting at number 78, then peaking at number 29 on the US Billboard Singles chart, staying for 15 weeks. The song peaked at number 23 in Canada. WBAX's program director, Paul Christie, commented that the song "has more hooks than a tackle box", viewing it as a "universal appeal" to become a worldwide hit. It was the only single to be released in the States taken from Wrap Your Arms Around Me. On the contrary, the song had minimal impact in other countries, where it only charted at number 63 in the UK and number 76 in Australia.

== Commercial performance ==
Wrap Your Arms Around Me debuted at number one in the Swedish chart on 14 June 1983, selling around 100,000 copies in the first two days since its release, making Fältskog's first album to top the chart. It was proclaimed Sweden's fastest and best selling album of 1983 in the territory. It topped the chart for two weeks and placed a total of twelve weeks, before dropping off by mid November, before it subsequently re-charted in January 1984. It has sold 350,000 copies in Sweden since its release. It also peaked at number one in Norway for a cumulative of five consecutive weeks. By the year end in 1984, it has sold more than 1,200,000 copies since its release.

In the United States, the album debuted at number 176 on the Billboard 200 on 17 September 1983, and at number 48 on the Rock Albums chart on 8 October 1983. A month later, it peaked at number 44 on the Billboard Rock Albums and number 102 on the Billboard 200, spending for a total of eleven weeks on that chart while it only charted four weeks on the rock sub-chart. It also debuted at 169 in the US Cashbox chart on 1 October 1983, and peaked at 125 a month later. This was Fältskog's solo only appearance on the Billboard 200 chart until A (2013) reached number 186. The album peaked at number 79 in the Canadian chart. In the UK, it debuted at number 23 on 5 June, then peaked at number 18 the following week, with a cumulative total of 13 weeks spent on the UK Albums Chart, and during its eleventh week in the chart, it was certified platinum by the BPI in that respective country, selling over 300,000 copies. Following its 2017 reissue, it charted at number 26 in the UK vinyl albums chart, following her native peaking at number three and 14 in both Swedish vinyl and physical sub-charts, respectively. The album charted in eleven countries. By 1999, it had sold an estimated 2,500,000 copies worldwide, according to Fältskog.

== Critical reception ==
Professional ratings
Review scores
Source	Rating
AllMusic	4/5 stars
Encyclopedia of Popular Music	3/5 stars
Rolling Stone	2/5 stars
Select	1/5 medals
Sounds	2.5/5 stars
The Philadelphia Inquirer	4/5 stars

Upon its release, the album received generally positive reviews from music critics, most citing its commercial output, but initially was sought with mixed reactions regarding its criticism over its sound. Andrew Slater of USA Today stated that Wrap Your Arms Around Me "sounds tailor-made for the adult contemporary radio, retaining much of the sunny eroticism of ABBA without imitating he group's distinctive pop style." Joe Viglione of AllMusic gave the album four out of five stars and wrote that songs like "The Heat Is On" and "Shame" were "much more refined than a lot of the dreck the major labels were issuing at the time" and that the album is "a healthy serving of charming melodies". He mentioned that the composition, "like the album, is a real gem". Phyl Garland from Stereo Review commented, "It gives her a chance to give full vent to her sex-pot side. She leaps into it with all of the enthusiasm of a cross-country Garbo, and the languid panting scarcely ever lets up. She is best, by far, on the slower numbers, such as the title song, a rhapsodic ballad […] the album is a highly entertaining piece of good commercial record making." Ken Tucker, for The Philadelphia Inquirer noted that Fältskog "turns in a series of pristine pop performances", touting the record as "undeniably slick but irresistibly charming" and a "pleasure" to listen to, describing the album as "immediately catchy, engrossing rock tunes".

Dutch magazine Hitkrant added, "The blonde ABBA-singer really let herself go completely", praising Chapman for his producing skills as "perfectly produced and executed." The Guardian praised the song "Wrap Your Arms Around Me" as a seductive ballad to be considered "one of her most underrated recordings" by fans.

In a mixed review, Christopher Connelly from Rolling Stone gave the album two out of five stars, declaring the record a "treacly, string-sopped outing", as well as a "hard invitation to resist" listening to the album. He called the songs "Mr. Persuasion" and "Once Burned, Twice Shy" as "positively incendiary", then proceeded with the song "Stay" and the rest of the album as "bogus". He blames Chapman by regarding Fältskog as a Swedish version of Sylvia Robinson. People Magazine wrote that her English solo debut sounds "like the group's (ABBA) recordings". Though praising her "strong (and) clear" vocal ability, they however were not impressed by multiple songwriting contributions on the record, calling it "serviceable if not overwhelmingly original". They also observed that people that disliked ABBA would not like Fältskog's solo record any better. Select was unfavourable regarding the album's record sleeve, describing it "looking recently deflowered on a black satin bean bag".

== Track listing ==
Side one
No.	Title	Writer(s)	Length
1.	"The Heat Is On"	Florrie Palmer; Tony Ashton	3:50
2.	"Can't Shake Loose"	Russ Ballard	4:20
3.	"Shame"	David Clark Allen	3:40
4.	"Stay"	Allen	3:20
5.	"Once Burned, Twice Shy"	Dan Tyler; Richard "Spady" Brannan	3:40
6.	"Mr. Persuasion"	Susan Lynch; Larry Whitman	2:45

Side two
No.	Title	Writer(s)	Length
1.	"Wrap Your Arms Around Me"	Mike Chapman; Holly Knight	5:15
2.	"To Love"	Jill Brandt; Randy Goodrum	3:49
3.	"I Wish Tonight Could Last Forever"	Ballard	4:12
4.	"Man"	Agnetha Fältskog	3:31
5.	"Take Good Care of Your Children"	Tomas Ledin	3:42
6.	"Stand by My Side"	Guido & Maurizio De Angelis; David Cowles	4:16
Total length:			46:20

2005 reissue edition (bonus tracks)
No.	Title	Writer(s)	Length
1.	"Never Again" (duet with Tomas Ledin)	Ledin	3:54
2.	"It's So Nice to Be Rich" (from the movie P&B)	Gunnar Svensson; Hans Alfredson	3:41
3.	"P&B" (B-side of "It's So Nice to Be Rich")	Svensson; Alfredson	4:01
4.	"The Heat Is On" (super dance music mix)	Palmer; Ashton	7:58
5.	"Ya nunca más" (Spanish version of "Never Again")	Ledin; Mary McCluskey; Buddy McCluskey	3:55

== Personnel ==
Adapted from the album's liner notes.

Musicians

- Agnetha Fältskog – vocals
- Smokie (Chris Norman, Alan Silson, Terry Uttley) – vocals
- Berit Andersson – vocals
- Maritza Horn – vocals
- Diana Nunez – vocals
- Rutger Gunnarsson – bass
- Lasse Wellander – guitar
- Per Lindvall – drums
- Peter Ljung – piano, organ, synthesizers
- Åke Sundqvist – percussion
- Kajtek Wojciechowski – accordion, saxophones
- Mats Ronander – harmonica
- Ingegerd Fredlund – harp
- Swedish Radio Symphony Orchestra – strings

Production

- Mike Chapman – producer
- Michael B. Tretow – engineer
- Rutger Gunnarsson – string arrangements
- Gered Mankowitz – photography
- David Costa – album design
- Lolo Murray – makeup artist

== Charts ==
=== Weekly charts ===
Chart (1983–84)	Peak position
Australia (Kent Music Report)	49
Canada Top Albums/CDs (RPM)	79
Dutch Albums (Album Top 100)	4
Finland (Suomen virallinen albumilista)	2
French Albums (SNEP)	47
German Albums (Offizielle Top 100)	13
Norwegian Albums (VG-lista)	1
Swedish Albums (Sverigetopplistan)	1
UK Albums (Official Charts)	18
US Billboard 200	102

=== Year-end charts ===
Chart (1983)	Position
Dutch Albums (Album Top 100)	35
German Albums (Offizielle Top 100)	50

== Certifications and sales ==
Region	Certification	Certified units/sales
Netherlands (NVPI)	Gold	50,000^{^}
Norway	—	100,000
Sweden (GLF)	Platinum	350,000
United Kingdom (BPI)	Platinum	300,000
Summaries
Worldwide	—	2,500,000
^{^} Shipments figures based on certification alone.

== Release history ==
Region	Date	Edition(s)	Format(s)	Label(s)	Ref.
Europe	30 May 1983	Standard	LP; Cassette	Polar; Polydor	
Sweden	3 June 1983	Standard	LP; Cassette	Polar	
United Kingdom	3 June 1983	Standard	LP; Cassette	Epic	
Australia	July 1983	Standard	LP; Cassette	RCA Victor	
Japan	August 1983	Standard	LP; Cassette	Discomate	
North America	8 August 1983	Standard	LP; Cassette	Polydor	
Europe	6 April 1988	Reissued Edition	CD	Polar; Polydor	
Sweden	15 August 2005	Reissued Edition	CD	Polar; Universal	
Various	13 September 2005	Reissued Edition	CD	Polar; Universal	
Various	28 July 2017	Coloured reissue	LP	Polar; UM^{e}	

== Notes ==
a: Since its inception in 1975, the Swedish Sverigetopplistan chart published album rankings over a two-week period till 1993. Wrap Your Arms Around Me reached number one for a total of four consecutive weeks and spent 24 weeks on the chart, despite the shift away from the two-week publication format.

== Bibliography ==
- Palm, Carl Magnus (2001). Bright Lights, Dark Shadows: The Real Story of ABBA. London: Omnibus. ISBN 978-0-7119-8389-2.
- Fältskog, Agnetha; Åhman, Brita (1997). As I Am: ABBA Before & Beyond. Virgin Books. ISBN 978-1-8522-7654-6.
