= Secret Service (band) =

Swedish band

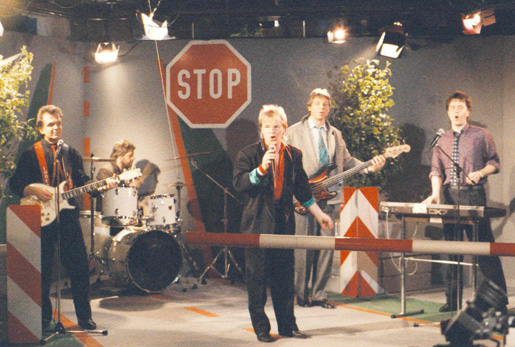
- Secret Service performing in 1985

Background information
- Also known as: Ola+3 (1979)
- Origin: Stockholm, Sweden
- Genres: Euro disco; synth-pop; hi-NRG; new wave; pop rock; pop
- Years active: 1979–1987; 1992; 2000; 2006–present
- Labels: Sonet; Stockholm; Perpetuum Music
- Members: Tim Norell; Ulf Wahlberg; Anders Hansson; Mats Lindberg; Jamie Borger; Jan-Erik Perning; Johan Becker
- Past members: Ola Håkansson; Tonny Lindberg; Leif Johansson; Leif Paulsén; Mikael Erlandsson
- Website: secretservicemusic.com

Secret Service is a Swedish pop band formed in Stockholm in 1979.

== History ==
In 1979, Ola Håkansson, former vocalist of Ola & the Janglers and then a publishing manager at Sonet Records, teamed up with Tim Norell and Ulf Wahlberg as Ola+3 to perform at the 1979 Melodifestivalen, a contest which is the Swedish qualification to the Eurovision Song Contest. Ola+3 did not win but the members decided to continue working together and recorded an LP as Ola+3. Besides Ola Håkansson (vocals), Tim Norell and Ulf Wahlberg (keyboards), the original lineup also included Tonny Lindberg (guitars), Leif Paulsen (bass) and Leif Johansson (drums). Norell, who along with lyricist Björn Håkanson penned most songs of the band, did not however appear with them on stage or on the band photos.

Song number two on that Swedish LP-release, "Oh Susie (Bara vi två vet)," was released as a single with English lyrics, and the band changed its name to Secret Service. "Oh Susie" became number 1 in Sweden and, after Radio Luxembourg played the song, it charted in different countries worldwide, including South America and Australia. In Germany alone it sold a million units, and Wahlberg stated in 2017 that "Oh Susie" went to number 1 in 29 countries. Their follow-up single, "Ten O'Clock Postman", also went gold in Sweden and became a top 5 single both in Germany and Japan.

Following the success of the soca-tinged single "Ye-Si-Ca" in Colombia, the band went to a two-week promotional tour of the South American continent.

Secret Service brought in new synthesizers into their sound; they had the first LinnDrum-machine that had just arrived in Sweden, and more successes followed, with their synthpop single "Flash in the Night," released in December 1981, hitting charts all over continental Europe. In May 1982 Secret Service released their third album Cutting Corners and their first Greatest Hits album was also released before Christmas.

The album Jupiter Sign released in 1984, marked a new direction for the band, moving on from synthesizers to the use of new technology like sampled sounds and sequenced beats. Ola Håkansson also took over lyric writing under the alias Oson.

With the album When the Night Closes In and the single "Night City," the band helped launch the sound of the Hi-NRG movement. When the Night Closes In was also the last album recorded with the original line up. Jonas Frick directed a 18-minute promotional video featuring 6 of the songs.

In 1986 Ola Håkansson released a duet with ex-ABBA member Agnetha Fältskog, "The Way You Are", which went gold in Sweden. In 1987 Håkansson, Norell and Wahlberg released Aux Deux Magots, their last album as Secret Service. New members were multi-instrumentalist Anders Hansson and bassist Mats A. Lindberg. Håkansson lost interest in being the singer and front man, and would become Norell's partner with Army of Lovers' Alexander Bard in what would be known as the Megatrio, the Swedish equivalent of Stock-Aitken-Waterman known as Norell Oson Bard.

In 1992, Håkansson and his associates established Stockholm Records as a joint venture with PolyGram.

In 2012, Secret Service released The Lost Box, an album with forgotten and unreleased recorded songs from the 1980s and early 1990s, such as "Different" and "Satellites".

Norell, Wahlberg, Hansson and Lindberg had begun to tour as Secret Service mostly in Russia with a new singer Mikael Erlandsson. Later it was Johan becker who took over the microphone. They also released a single, Secret Mission, in 2020. On 18 November 2022, a new album with new material was released.

Tim Norell died on December 16th 2023 in Stockholm. He was 68.

== Personnel ==
Current members

- Ulf Wahlberg – vocals, keyboards (1979–present)
- Anders Hansson – bass, keyboards (1986–present)
- Fredrik Karnell – bass (2023–present)
- Jamie Borger – drums (2006–present)
- Jan-Erik Perning – drums (2006–present)
- Johan Becker – vocals, guitars (2018–present)

Former members

- Ola Håkansson – vocals (1979–2000)
- Tim Norell – vocals, keyboards (1979–2023)
- Tonny Lindberg – guitars (1979–1986)
- Leif Johansson – drums (1979–1986)
- Leif Paulsén – bass (1979–1986)
- Mikael Erlandsson – vocals, guitars (2006–2018)
- Mats A. Lindberg – bass (1987–2023)

== Discography ==
=== Albums ===
==== Studio albums ====
Year	Title	Peak chart positions		
Year	Title	FIN	GER	SWE
1979
1979	Oh Susie	—	—	7
1981	Ye Si Ca	—	56	20
1982	Cutting Corners	12	—	9
1984	Jupiter Sign	—	—	25
1985	When the Night Closes In	24	—	37
1987	Aux Deux Magots	—	—	46
2022	Secret Mission	—	—	—
"—" denotes releases that did not chart or were not released

==== Compilation albums ====
Year	Title	Peaks
Year	Title	SWE
1982	Greatest Hits	14
1984	Sonets Guldskiveartister	—
1987	Collection	—
1988	Spotlight	—
1998	The Very Best Of	—
2000	Top Secret – Greatest Hits	49
2002	En Popklassiker	—
2012	The Lost Box	60
"—" denotes releases that did not chart or were not released

=== Singles ===
Year	Single	Peak chart positions										
Year	Single	AUS	AUT	BE	DEN	FIN	FRA	GER	NL	NOR	SWE	SWI
1979	"Oh Susie"	49	—	—	7	27	35	9	—	6	1	—
1979	"Ten O'Clock Postman"	—	8	—	—	30	—	4	—	—	18	—
1979	"Darling, You're My Girl"	—	—	—	—	—	—	—	—	—	—	—
1980	"Ye Si Ca"	—	11	—	9	—	—	8	—	—	18	6
1981	"L.A. Goodbye"	—	—	—	11	—	—	16	—	—	—	—
1981	"Flash in the Night"	—	—	17	12	8	6	23	42	6	12	9
1982	"Cry Softly (Time Is Mourning)"	—	—	—	—	18	—	27	—	10	12	8
1982	"If I Try"	—	—	—	—	—	—	—	—	—	—	—
1982	"Dancing in Madness"	—	—	—	10	—	—	—	—	—	11	—
1983	"Do It"	—	—	—	—	18	—	—	—	—	—	—
1983	"Jo-Anne, Jo-Anne"	—	—	—	—	—	—	—	—	—	—	—
1984	"How I Want You"	—	—	—	—	—	—	—	—	—	—	—
1985	"Let Us Dance Just a Little Bit More"	—	—	—	—	—	—	—	—	—	—	—
1985	"When the Night Closes In"	—	—	—	—	—	—	51	—	—	—	—
1986	"Night City"	—	—	—	—	—	—	—	—	—	—	—
1986	"The Way You Are" (Ola Håkansson & Agnetha Fältskog)	—	—	—	—	—	—	—	—	—	1	—
1987	"Say, Say"	—	—	—	—	—	—	—	—	—	—	—
1987	"I'm So, I'm So, I'm So (I'm So in Love with You)"	—	—	—	—	17	—	—	—	—	—	—
1988	"Don't You Know, Don't You Know"	—	—	—	—	—	—	—	—	—	—	—
1990	"Megamix"	—	—	—	—	11	—	—	—	—	—	—
1997	"Flash in the Night" (The Antiloop Reconstruction)	—	—	—	—	—	—	—	—	—	35	—
2000	"The Dancer"	—	—	—	—	—	—	—	—	—	—	—
2009	"Different"	—	—	—	—	—	—	—	—	—	—	—
2010	"Satellites"	—	—	—	—	—	—	—	—	—	—	—
2019	"Go On"	—	—	—	—	—	—	—	—	—	—	—
2020	"Secret Mission"	—	—	—	—	—	—	—	—	—	—	—
2021	"Lit de Parade"	—	—	—	—	—	—	—	—	—	—	—
2022	"Jane"	—	—	—	—	—	—	—	—	—	—	—
2022	"Mama Tell Me Why"	—	—	—	—	—	—	—	—	—	—	—
2022	"You Stole My Heart"	—	—	—	—	—	—	—	—	—	—	—
2022	"Little Zhora"	—	—	—	—	—	—	—	—	—	—	—
2023	"Together We Stand"	—	—	—	—	—	—	—	—	—	—	—
2025	"Never Get Over You"	—	—	—	—	—	—	—	—	—	—	—
2025	"If I Wanna Love Somebody"	—	—	—	—	—	—	—	—	—	—	—
"—" denotes releases that did not chart or were not released
