= Can't Shake Loose =

- Picture sleeve for European releases

Single by Agnetha Fältskog

from the album Wrap Your Arms Around Me
- B-side: "To Love"
- Released: 13 August 1983
- Recorded: 1983
- Studio: Polar Music Studios (Stockholm)
- Genre: Europop; pop; pop rock
- Length: 4:22 (album version); 3:15 (AOR remix/US single edit); 3:54 (D.J. version)
- Label: Polar
- Songwriter: Russ Ballard
- Producer: Mike Chapman

Agnetha Fältskog singles chronology
"Wrap Your Arms Around Me" (1983)	"Can't Shake Loose" (1983)	"It's So Nice to Be Rich" (1984)

Music video
- "Can't Shake Loose" on YouTube

Music video
- "Can’t Shake Loose (D.J. Version)" on YouTube

Alternative cover
- US picture sleeve

"Can't Shake Loose" is a song by Swedish singer Agnetha Fältskog from her seventh studio (and first english) album, Wrap Your Arms Around Me (1983). The song was written by Russ Ballard, who also wrote the successful "I Know There's Something Going On" for Faltskog's ABBA colleague Anni-Frid Lyngstad (Frida). It was released as Faltskog's debut single on 13 August 1983 in the United States, by Polydor Records, and 7 October internationally through Polar Music as the album's third single.

"Can't Shake Loose" proved received generally positive reviews from music critics and radio programmers, highlighting it to become a worldwide hit. It was successful on the US Billboard Hot 100, where it peaked at number 29, making it her only Top 40 hit in that country, additionally peaking at number 23 in Canada. As usual, Fältskog did only limited promotion, although she appeared on American television in August to promote her single. In the UK and Australia, however, the track charted modestly, both reaching number 63 and 76, respectively.

== Music video ==
Agnetha filmed a promotional video for the track, in which she portrayed a worried and nervous girlfriend of a rich and powerful man, played by Mikael Rickfors. She also drove a Porsche in the clip. The video is unusual for the time as Agnetha does not mime the lyrics to the song during the clip, with the exception of the "I don't want to stay here" bridge.

== Reception ==
WBAX's program director, Paul Christie, commented that the song "has more hooks than a tackle box", viewing it as a "universal appeal" to become an worldwide hit. Ian Birch, for Smash Hits, wrote a mixed review, stating that although the song "isn't too bad", it has a "dull bass-and-drum production while Agnetha's idea of variety is switching from a shout to a croaky whisper."

== Charts ==
Chart performance for "Can't Shake Loose"
Chart (1983)	Peak position
Australia (Kent Music Report)	76
Belgium (Ultratop 50 Flanders)	24
Canada Top Singles (RPM)	23
France (SNEP)	42
UK Singles (Official Charts)	63
US Billboard Hot 100	29
US Cash Box Top 100 Singles	32

== Release history ==
Release formats for Can't Shake Loose
Region	Date	Label	Format	Ref.
United States	13 August 1983	Polydor	7-inch vinyl; 12-inch vinyl	
Japan	21 August 1983	Discomate	7-inch vinyl	
Various	7 October 1983	Polar	7-inch vinyl	
United Kingdom	7 October 1983	Epic	7-inch picture disc	
Australia	7 October 1983	RCA Victor	7-inch vinyl	
