= The Last Time (Agnetha Fältskog song) =

Single by Agnetha Fältskog

from the album I Stand Alone
- B-side: "Are You Gonna Throw It All Away"
- Released: 15 January 1988
- Recorded: 1987
- Studio: Chartmaker Studios (Malibu, CA)
- Genre: Pop
- Length: 4:15
- Label: WEA
- Songwriters: Robin Randall; Judithe Randall; Jeff Law
- Producer: Peter Cetera

Agnetha Fältskog singles chronology
"The Way You Are" (1986)	"The Last Time" (1988)	"I Wasn't the One (Who Said Goodbye)" (1988)

"The Last Time" is a song by the Swedish singer Agnetha Fältskog, written by Robin Randall, Judithe Randall, and Jeff Law, and produced by Peter Cetera. It was taken as the lead single to her third English language album I Stand Alone (1987), and released on 15 January 1988 via WEA Records. It contained a different sound from Fältskog's previous releases due to the American West Coast influence of producers Cetera and Bruce Gaitsch. She also recorded a Spanish version of the single, "La última vez", which was included in South American editions of I Stand Alone.

The single charted poorly worldwide, its highest peak being in Belgium at number 24. In 1993 Mark Free covered this song and it is on his album Long Way from Love.

== Critical reception ==
Robin Smith of Record Mirror panned the single as not a "very good comeback song", and that it "[ditters] around alarmingly and [does not know] what to do with itself."

== Music video ==
Marcello Anziano and Lynne Miller of AWGO filmed the video for "The Last Time", along with the follow up single "I Wasn't the One (Who Said Goodbye)". She spoke of whether it marked difficult keeping up with her younger peers visually saying, "Obviously, my approach is completely different. I don’t want to look like a sixteen-year-old, but like the mature woman that I am. Indeed, I believe that it’s more difficult for an older artist to create some kind of video image. For me, the album and the video have the same quality standard." Pan-European magazine Music & Media noted some "interesting editing as objects fly across the screen and shatter into a thousand pieces before your eyes."

== Formats and track listings ==
7-inch single

1. "The Last Time" – 4:12
2. "Are You Gonna Throw It All Away" – 4:52

12-inch single and 3-inch CD single

1. "The Last Time" (Extended Remix) – 6:52
2. "The Last Time" (Album Version) – 4:12
3. "Are You Gonna Throw It All Away" – 4:55

== Charts ==
Chart performance for "The Last Time"
Chart (1988)	Peak position
Belgium (Ultratop 50 Flanders)	24
Netherlands (Dutch Top 40 Tipparade)	2
Netherlands (Single Top 100)	40
UK Singles (OCC)	77
West Germany (GfK)	49
