= The Heat Is On (Agnetha Fältskog song) =

Single by Agnetha Fältskog

from the album Wrap Your Arms Around Me
- B-side: "Man"
- Released: 3 May 1983
- Recorded: 1983
- Studio: Polar Studios (Stockholm, Sweden)
- Genre: Europop; calypso
- Length: 3:53
- Label: Polar
- Songwriters: Florrie Palmer; Tony Ashton
- Producer: Mike Chapman

Agnetha Fältskog singles chronology
"Never Again" (1982)	"The Heat Is On" (1983)	"Wrap Your Arms Around Me" (1983)

"The Heat Is On" is a song written by Florrie Palmer and Tony Ashton, originally recorded by Australian singer Noosha Fox in 1979. It was recorded by Swedish singer Agnetha Fältskog for her seventh and debut English studio album, Wrap Your Arms Around Me (1983). Lyrically, the song features imagery of an escapade in a wild setting.

Fox's version of "The Heat Is On" was released as a single-only format through Chrysalis Records, but did not chart anywhere. Faltskog's version was released as the lead single from Wrap Your Arms Around Me in most countries, first released on 3 May 1983, by Polar Records. It topped the Swedish and Norwegian singles chart, becoming the first in her career. Throughout Europe, it received positive receptions during its chart inception. In the United Kingdom, it peaked at number 35, becoming her first single in that territory, running for seven weeks on that chart.

== Original releases ==
The song was originally recorded in 1979 by Noosha Fox, which failed to chart when Fox released it as a single. It had also been rewritten by Manfred Mann's Earth Band as "On the Run" for their 1980 album Chance.

== Agnetha Fältskog version ==
Fältskog's version was released as lead European single from Wrap Your Arms Around Me.

=== Background ===
In 1982, ABBA had released the compilation The Singles: The First Ten Years, Frida had embarked on a solo career with her successful first English-language album, Something's Going On, produced by Phil Collins, while Fältskog released a duet single, Never Again with Tomas Ledin. In early 1983, Fältskog recorded the album Wrap Your Arms Around Me and the lead single became "The Heat Is On", released on May 1983. In an interview, Fältskog said “every time a single of ours becomes a hit we are happy. Now that I hear my own single on the radio I get excited. A very happy feeling. Especially because we worked hard on it. It has influenced my life for months.”

The B-side of "The Heat Is On" was the song "Man", written by Fältskog herself. Compared to her pre-ABBA-albums where most of the songs were self-penned, this was the only song on the Wrap Your Arms Around Me album that she wrote herself.

=== Critical reception ===
Simon Tebbutt of Record Mirror panned the single, describing the title as "more like a lukewarm cup of British Rail char all over your best polyester", and the track itself as just a "batty Brazilian beat that's about as infra red as a great big Swedish iceberg."

=== Chart performance ===
The single reached the top positions in Sweden and Norway, and peaked at number two in Belgium and the Netherlands. In the UK, it peaked at number 35, making it Fältskog's highest-charting solo single in that country until the release of her 2004 comeback single, "If I Thought You'd Ever Change Your Mind", which reached number 11.

In some countries, the record companies also released a 12-inch single featuring an extended version of "The Heat Is On" instead of the album version.

=== Music video ===
The accompanying music video was shot by Swedish director Erik Irion Nanne in a public bath in Stockholm named Centralbadet for two nights after closing time. According to Nanne, after the last shot, Fältskog fell into the water and could not continue due to her hair getting wet. The video also features dancer Blossom Tainton.

== Track listings ==
International 7" single

1. "The Heat Is On" (7" edit)
2. "Man"

European, French 12" Special Maxi single

1. "The Heat Is On" (Special Maxi edit)
2. "Man"

Canadian 12" Maxi single

1. "The Heat Is On" (Extended Version)
2. "Wrap Your Arms Around Me"
3. "Take Good Care of Your Children"

South American 7" single

1. "The Heat Is On" (7" edit)
2. "Can't Shake Loose"

== Charts ==
Weekly chart performance for "The Heat Is On"
Chart (1983)	Peak position
Belgium (Ultratop 50 Flanders)	2
Finland (Suomen virallinen lista)	22
Ireland (IRMA)	28
Netherlands (Dutch Top 40)	2
Netherlands (Single Top 100)	5
Norway (VG-lista)	1
Sweden (Sverigetopplistan)	1
Switzerland (Schweizer Hitparade)	15
UK Singles (OCC)	35
West Germany (GfK)	20

Year-end chart performance for "The Heat Is On"
Chart (1983)	Position
Belgium (Ultratop 50 Flanders)	24
Netherlands (Dutch Top 40)	20
Netherlands (Single Top 100)	41

== Release history ==
Region	Date	Format(s)	Label(s)	Ref.
Sweden	3 May 1983	7-inch vinyl; 12-inch vinyl; 12-inch maxi	Polar	
United Kingdom	13 May 1983	7-inch picture disc	Epic	
Mexico	January 1984	7-inch vinyl	RCA	
