= I Wasn't the One (Who Said Goodbye) =

"I Wasn't the One (Who Said Good-Bye)"
- 1988 European re-issue cover

Single by Agnetha Fältskog with Peter Cetera

from the album I Stand Alone
- Released: 22 February 1988
- Recorded: 1987
- Length: 4:10
- Label: WEA; Atlantic (U.S.)
- Songwriters: Mark Mueller; Aaron Zigman
- Producer: Peter Cetera

Agnetha Fältskog singles chronology
| "The Last Time" (1987) | "I Wasn't the One (Who Said Good-Bye)" (1988) | "Let It Shine" (1988) |

"I Wasn't the One (Who Said Goodbye)" is a duet by Swedish singer Agnetha Fältskog and American singer Peter Cetera, formerly the lead singer and bass guitar player for rock band Chicago. The track was recorded for Fältskog's third English language studio album I Stand Alone (1987). It was written by Mark Mueller and Aaron Zigman, with Cetera providing production. It was released on 22 February 1988 as the second single from the album. A Spanish language version of the song, "Yo No Fui (Quien Dijo Adiós)", was also recorded and included in South American versions of I Stand Alone.

It proved arguably the album's biggest chart success, peaking at number 93 on both the Canadian RPM Top 100 and US Billboard Hot 100 charts; it was also a top twenty hit on the AC charts in both countries. Like usual, Fältskog did not do any promotion for the single in North America.

== Recording ==
During the recording of the song, Fältskog and Cetera both shared the studio microphone.

== Critical reception ==
Ron Fell and Diane Rufer of Gavin Report said the song recalls of Cetera's previous duet, "The Next Time I Fall", with Amy Grant. Cash Box reviewed "I Wasn't the One" as a "smash ballad-duet". Dutch magazine Hitkrant wrote neutrally of the song, as they expected more of the "combination of top notch talents like this."

== Music video ==
A music video was shot in Stockholm by Egill Eðvarðsson, but did not show Cetera on camera. Fältskog had high hopes that the song would become a hit after the album had reportedly not sold many copies. By 2nd July 1988, it was reported that Eðvarðsson had been putting the finishing touches to the video.

== Formats and track listings ==
The single was released in four formats:

- 7"-single
1. "I Wasn't The One (Who Said Goodbye)" 4:12
2. "If You Need Somebody Tonight" 3:30
- 12"-single
1. "I Wasn't The One (Who Said Goodbye)" [Extended Version] 6:00
2. "Yo No Fui (Quien Dijo Adiós)" 4:12
3. "If You Need Somebody Tonight" 3:30
- Cassette single [USA]
1. "I Wasn't The One (Who Said Goodbye)" 4:06
2. "If You Need Somebody Tonight" 3:32
- 3"-CD-single [Japan]
1. "I Wasn't The One (Who Said Goodbye)"
2. "If You Need Somebody Tonight"

== Charts ==
=== Weekly charts ===
Weekly chart performance for "I Wasn't The One (Who Said Goodbye)"
| Chart (1987) | Peak position |
|---|---|
| Canada Top Singles (RPM) | 93 |
| Canada Adult Contemporary (RPM) | 21 |
| UK Singles (OCC) | 200 |
| US Billboard Hot 100 | 93 |
| US Adult Contemporary (Billboard) | 19 |
| US Adult Contemporary (Gavin Report) | 11 |

Weekly chart performance for "Yo No Fui (Quien Dijo Adiós)"
| Chart (1988) | Peak Position |
|---|---|
| Paraguay (UPI) | 10 |

=== Year-end charts ===
Year-end chart performance for "I Wasn't The One (Who Said Goodbye)"
| Chart (1987) | Position |
|---|---|
| US Adult Contemporary (Gavin Report) | 90 |
