= One Way Love (Agnetha Fältskog song) =

Single by Agnetha Fältskog

from the album Eyes of a Woman
- B-side: "Turn the World Around"
- Released: 10 June 1985
- Recorded: 1985
- Genre: Europop, pop
- Length: 3:40
- Label: Polar Music
- Songwriter: Jeff Lynne
- Producer: Eric Stewart

Agnetha Fältskog singles chronology
| "I Won't Let You Go" (1985) | "One Way Love" (1985) | "The Way You Are" (1986) |

"One Way Love" is a song by Swedish singer Agnetha Fältskog. It was released on 10 June 1985 as the second single taken from her eighth studio album Eyes of a Woman (1985). The song was written by Jeff Lynne and produced by Eric Stewart.

The song was the second single to be released from the album and the opening track on the album itself. A video was produced, featuring a 1950s tone, in line with the upbeat and somewhat retro feel of the song.

Jane Esterzhas also recorded a Spanish-language version with vocals by Delana Borges that was mildly well received.

== Charts ==
| Chart (1985) | Peak position |
|---|---|
| Netherlands (Single Tip) | 27 |
