= Wrap Your Arms Around Me (song) =

- Spanish picture sleeve (zoomed-in and mirrored for other international releases)

Single by Agnetha Fältskog

from the album Wrap Your Arms Around Me
- B-side: "Take Good Care of Your Children"
- Released: 22 July 1983
- Recorded: 1983
- Genre: Europop
- Length: 5:13 (album version); 3:52 (single edit)
- Label: Polar Music
- Songwriters: Mike Chapman; Holly Knight
- Producer: Mike Chapman

Agnetha Fältskog singles chronology
"The Heat Is On" (1983)	"Wrap Your Arms Around Me" (1983)	"Can't Shake Loose" (1983)

"Wrap Your Arms Around Me" is a song by Swedish singer and ABBA member Agnetha Fältskog, recorded for her seventh studio album and English-language debut of the same name. It was written by Mike Chapman and Holly Knight, and produced by the former. It was released on 22 July 1983, via Polar Music, as the second single from Wrap Your Arms Around Me. It proved a chart success, reaching number one in Belgium, and the top five in the Netherlands and South Africa.

== Release ==
The single featured an edit of the album version which was also included on the 12" single released exclusively in the UK.

The single's B-side was a Tomas Ledin composition, "Take Good Care Of Your Children".

In 2009, the song was remixed as a nine-minute edit by Belgian dance music producer Villa.

== Critical reception ==
Gavin Martin for New Musical Express rated the single negatively, criticizing producer Mike Chapman's attempt "to recreate the ice breaker crispiness of Blondie's "Heart of Glass"" and Fältskog's "leaden delivery". Robin Smith for Record Mirror panned "Wrap Your Arms Around Me" as being too close to ABBA's "turgid old ballads."

== Chart reception ==
"Wrap Your Arms Around Me" was Fältskog's second solo single after "The Heat Is On", and reached No. 1 in Belgium. The song was also a Top 5 hit in the Netherlands and South Africa. It was the most successful single from the album in Ireland, improving on the No. 28 position of "The Heat Is On" by reaching No. 15. By contrast, the song failed to reach the UK Singles Chart Top 40 (peaking at No. 44).

== Cover versions ==
Bonnie St. Claire performed the Dutch version, "Sla je arm om me heen" in 1983.

Sylvie Vartan performed the French version, "Des heures de désir" in 1984. She also recorded an English language cover version on the album "Made In USA" (released in Japan as "Double Exposure") in 1985.

Britta Phillips covered the song on her debut album, Luck Or Magic (2016).

== Charts ==
=== Weekly charts ===
Weekly chart performance for "Wrap Your Arms Around Me"
Chart (1983)	Peak position
Austria (Ö3 Austria Top 40)	20
Europarade (Top 30)	11
Belgium (Ultratop 50 Flanders)	1
Ireland (IRMA)	15
Netherlands (Dutch Top 40)	5
Netherlands (Single Top 100)	4
Netherlands (Single Top 100)	4
South Africa (Springbok)	2
UK Singles (OCC)	44
West Germany (GfK)	30

=== Year-end charts ===
Year-end chart performance for "Wrap Your Arms Around Me"
Chart (1983)	Position
Belgium (Ultratop Flanders)	16
Netherlands (Dutch Top 40)	97
Netherlands (Single Top 100)	83
