= Never Again (Tomas Ledin song) =

- Standard picture sleeve

Single by Tomas Ledin and Agnetha Fältskog

from the album The Human Touch
- B-side: "Just for the Fun"
- Released: October 1982
- Recorded: 1982
- Genre: Europop
- Length: 3:55
- Label: Polar Music
- Songwriter: Tomas Ledin
- Producer: Tomas Ledin

Tomas Ledin singles chronology
"Du tänder mej" (1982)	"Never Again" (1982)	"I Love You" (1983)

Agnetha Fältskog singles chronology
"När Du Tar Mig I Din Famn" (1979)	"Never Again" (1982)	"The Heat Is On" (1983)

"Never Again" is a song by Swedish singer Tomas Ledin from his tenth studio album, The Human Touch (1982). The track is a duet with ABBA member and label-mate Agnetha Fältskog. It was released in October 1982 as a single from the album via Polar Music.

== Overview ==
Although Ledin was a well-known figure in Sweden, he was relatively unknown outside of the country. Stig Anderson, the owner of Polar Music and manager of the band ABBA, believed in Ledin's singing ability and wanted to promote him across the continent. Upon hearing "Never Again", Anderson thought this song would make a good duet, and suggested ABBA's Agnetha Fältskog to record the song with him.

Although a duet, Ledin and Fältskog were not together in the studio when they laid down their vocal tracks.

== Release and reception ==
Released as a single, "Never Again" peaked at No. 2 in Sweden and was also a top-10 entry in Norway and Belgium. Ledin and Fältskog also recorded a Spanish version of the song entitled "Ya Nunca Más". The song was originally released on Tomas Ledin album 1982 The Human Touch. It was later included as a bonus track on the reissue of Fältskog's album Wrap Your Arms Around Me and on a number of her compilation albums.

Reviewing for Record Mirror, Christine Buckley mocked the song as an "epic" and that "there's very little you can say about [the song], except avoid it at all costs."

== Charts ==
Chart performance for "Never Again"
Chart (1982)	Peak position
Belgium (Ultratop 50 Flanders)	9
Finland (Suomen virallinen lista)	8
Netherlands (Dutch Top 40)	24
Netherlands (Single Top 100)	19
Norway (VG-lista)	5
Sweden (Sverigetopplistan)	2
West Germany (GfK)	37
