= Let It Shine (Agnetha Fältskog song) =

Single by Agnetha Fältskog

from the album I Stand Alone
- Released: 12 September 1988
- Recorded: 1987
- Studio: Chartmaker Studios (Malibu, California): Skyline Recording (Topanga, California); That Studio (North Hollywood, California); Sun Valley Audio (Sun Valley, Idaho); Zebra Studio (Studio City, California)
- Genre: Pop
- Length: 4:00
- Label: WEA
- Songwriters: Austin Roberts; Beckie Foster; Bill Labounty
- Producer: Peter Cetera

Agnetha Fältskog singles chronology
"I Wasn't the One (Who Said Goodbye)" (1987)	"Let It Shine" (1988)	"The Queen Of Hearts" (1996)

"Let It Shine" is a song by Swedish singer Agnetha Fältskog, from her third English language and tenth studio album, I Stand Alone (1987). It was written by Austin Roberts, Beckie Foster and Bill Labounty, while produced by Peter Cetera. The song itself is the last single Fältskog released in the 1980s.

The song itself debuted on both Swedish and Danish radio stations in December 1987. It was charted on airplay reports in both countries, but didn't chart in other countries. A remixed version of the song was also made in Sweden by Johan Ekelund.

== Formats and track listings ==
The song was released in various formats with several versions of this song:

- 7"-single
1. "Let It Shine" [Album Version] 4:00
2. "Maybe It Was Magic" 4:10
- 7"-remix single
1. "Let It Shine [Remixed Version] 3:32
2. "Maybe It Was Magic" 4:10
- 12"-single
1. "Let It Shine" [Extended Version] 5:30
2. "Let It Shine" [Album Version] 4:00
3. "Maybe It Was Magic" 4:10
- 12"-single (only released in the UK)
1. "Let It Shine" [Bright-Remix] 3:51
2. "Let It Shine" [Album Version] 4:00
3. "Maybe It Was Magic" 4:10
- Cassette single (only released in the USA)
1. "Let It Shine" [Album Version] 3:58
2. "Maybe It Was Magic" 4:07
- 3"-CD-single (only released in Japan)
1. "Let It Shine" [Album Version]
2. "Maybe It Was Magic"

== Release history ==
Release formats for Let It Shine
Region	Date	Label	Format	Ref.
Japan	25 July 1988	WEA	7-inch vinyl; Mini-CD	
Sweden	12 September 1988	WEA	7-inch vinyl; Cassette	
UK	12 September 1988	WEA	7-inch vinyl; Cassette	
US	12 September 1988	Atlantic	7-inch vinyl; Cassette	
