= Eyes of a Woman =

Studio album by Agnetha Fältskog
- Released: 25 March 1985
- Recorded: October–November 1984
- Studios: Polar Music Studios, Stockholm
- Genre: Pop rock
- Length: 43:45
- Label: Polar
- Producer: Eric Stewart

Agnetha Fältskog chronology
| Wrap Your Arms Around Me (1983) | Eyes of a Woman (1985) | Agnetha Collection (1986) |

Singles from Eyes Of A Woman
- 1. "I Won't Let You Go" Released: 29 March 1985; 2. "One Way Love" Released: 14 June 1985; 3. "Just One Heart" Released: September 1985 (Netherlands); 4. "The Angels Cry" Released: 1985 (Netherlands); 5. "Click Track" Released: 1985 (South Africa)

Eyes of a Woman is the eighth studio album, and second English-language solo studio album by Swedish singer and former ABBA member Agnetha Fältskog, released on 25 March 1985 and 15 April in the UK. The album was recorded at Polar Music Studios in Stockholm between October and November 1984, with production by Eric Stewart of 10cc. It features contributions from musicians such as Justin Hayward of The Moody Blues, as well as songs written by various composers, including Jeff Lynne and John Wetton.

The album includes tracks initially left off the final release but later added as bonus material in reissues. Promotional efforts included performances in several European countries and at the Montreux Jazz Festival. Commercially, Eyes of a Woman reached the Top 40 in the UK and peaked at number 2 in Sweden, with additional chart success in Norway, the Netherlands, Belgium, and West Germany. It was reissued in 2005 and again in 2017 on vinyl as part of a series of ABBA solo album re-releases.

== Background ==
The album was recorded in the Polar Music Studios in Stockholm. Sessions began in early October 1984 and lasted until the end of November. The album was produced by Eric Stewart of 10cc and features former 10cc members Rick Fenn and Vic Emerson as session musicians, as well as Stewart's longtime friend Justin Hayward of The Moody Blues.

Thomas Johansson, founder of the music agency EMA Telstar had brought forward Eric Stewart, who Fältskog had met during her time in ABBA, She liked the choice of producer and stated that Stewart was a very calm, pleasant partner to work with. In Summer 1984, composers and publishers sent Fältskog and Stewart approximately 400 songs.

Notable songwriters who contributed to the album included Jeff Lynne, John Wetton and Geoff Downes as well as Justin Hayward and Eric Stewart himself. Long time ABBA fan Elvis Costello submitted a track "Shatterproof" for inclusion on the album, however Fältskog decided against recording it. Fältskog and Stewart worked closely with engineer Paris Edvinson who contributed to a lot of ideas and Rutger Gunnarsson who also wrote some arrangements.

Two of the songs recorded, "Turn the World Around" and "You're There", were not included on the initial album, but were released as B-sides. "You're There" and "I Won't Let You Go" were composed by Fältskog herself with lyrics by Eric Stewart. Stewart’s ballad "I Won't Be Leaving You" was one of Fältskog’s favourite songs from the album.

During the photo sessions for the sleeve of the album, Agnetha posed at the terrace of Drottningholm Palace, the official residence of the Swedish royal family, in Stockholm.

== Release ==
Initially, "One Way Love" was suggested to be the lead single, but "I Won't Let You Go" received the majority of votes. Agnetha had agreed with this decision. The tracks "One Way Love" and "I Won't Let You Go" were released as singles throughout Europe. Agnetha promoted the album and singles in Sweden, Norway (and the USA via cable network), Germany, Belgium (in tv show "MIKE", recorded March 21) and at the Montreux Jazz Festival in May 1985 where Fältskog performed "One Way Love".

The album was reissued in 2005 with the singles' B-sides and the non-album single "The Way You Are" (along with its B-side) as bonus tracks. On 28 July 2017, Eyes of a Woman was re-released on 180-gram black and red vinyl as part of the reissue of several solo albums by members of ABBA

== Critical reception ==
Professional ratings
Review scores
| Source | Rating |
|---|---|
| AllMusic | 2.5/5 stars |
| Hitkrant | 3.5/4 discs |

Wouter, writing for Dutch magazine Hitkrant, adopted a positive tone, noting that ABBA fans would have found in the new release plenty of reasons to rush to the stores. He highlighted the quality of the production, surrounded by top-level musicians and composers, and pointed out favorite tracks such as "Just One Heart" and "We Should Be Together", the latter described as the catchiest. He also mentioned "I Won’t Let You Go" as a potential hit and praised the originality of "I Keep Turning Off Lights", reaffirming Agnetha’s versatility. Although he acknowledged that the album could have had more variety, his overall assessment was that it was worth listening to.

Dave Thompson, of AllMusic, acknowledged Eric Stewart's meticulous production and the blend of Euro-pop with elements of '80s adult rock, but considered that the album maintained a dark and somewhat unwelcoming tone. To him, Agnetha rarely fully explored the most distinctive features of her voice, hiding them beneath heavily produced ballads. He singled out "I Won't Be Leaving You" and "The Angels Cry" as strong moments, but criticised the apparent lack of interest from the singer, evidenced both in her delivery of the songs and in her failure to promote the album. He concluded that Eyes of a Woman conveyed the sense of an artist who had already distanced herself from the public scene.

== Commercial performance ==
In Sweden, Eyes of a Woman peaked at number two, making this her third album to chart in the top ten. The album also reached number 38 on the UK Albums Chart with modest sales, only to remain for two weeks. It also reached number 14 in Norway, number 19 in the Netherlands, and number 30 in West Germany.

The album sold more than 300,000 copies worldwide as of August 1985, about half that amount in Scandinavia.

== Track listing ==
Side one
| No. | Title | Writer(s) | Length |
|---|---|---|---|
| 1. | "One Way Love" | Jeff Lynne | 3:36 |
| 2. | "Eyes of a Woman" | Paris Edvinson; Marianne Flynner | 3:54 |
| 3. | "Just One Heart" | Paul Muggleton; Robert Noble | 3:42 |
| 4. | "I Won't Let You Go" | Agnetha Fältskog; Eric Stewart | 3:39 |
| 5. | "The Angels Cry" | Justin Hayward | 4:22 |
| 6. | "Click Track" | Jan Ince; Phil Palmer | 2:51 |

Side two
| No. | Title | Writer(s) | Length |
|---|---|---|---|
| 1. | "We Should Be Together" | Jay Gruska; Tom Keane | 3:59 |
| 2. | "I Won't Be Leaving You" | Stewart | 5:34 |
| 3. | "Save Me (Why Don't Ya)" | Stewart | 4:37 |
| 4. | "I Keep Turning Off Lights" | China Burton | 3:37 |
| 5. | "We Move As One" | John Wetton; Geoffrey Downes | 4:04 |
| Total length: | | | 43:45 |

2005 CD reissue bonus tracks
| No. | Title | Writer(s) | Length |
|---|---|---|---|
| 1. | "You're There" (B-side of "I Won't Let You Go") | Fältskog; Stewart | 3:29 |
| 2. | "Turn the World Around" (B-side of "One Way Love") | Randy Edelman | 4:15 |
| 3. | "I Won't Let You Go" (extended version) | Fältskog; Stewart | 6:02 |
| 4. | "The Way You Are" (duet with Ola Håkansson) | Tim Norell; Ola Håkansson; Alexander Bard | 3:45 |
| 5. | "Fly Like the Eagle" (duet with Ola Håkansson) | Norell; Håkansson; Bard | 3:05 |

== Personnel ==
Adapted from the album's liner notes.

Musicians

- Agnetha Fältskog – lead vocals, backing vocals
- Eric Stewart – percussion, Fender Rhodes piano, backing vocals
- Anders Glenmark – backing vocals
- Karin Glenmark – backing vocals
- Marianne Flynner – backing vocals
- Jamie Lane – drums
- Per Allsing – drums (2)
- Rutger Gunnarsson – bass guitar
- Rick Fenn – guitars
- Vic Emerson – keyboards, synthesizers
- Justin Hayward – guitars (5)
- Mel Collins – saxophones (1, 7)

Production

- Eric Stewart – producer, cover concept
- Paris Edvinson – engineer, mixing
- Michael B. Tretow – mixing (4, 5)
- Gundars Rullis – tape operator
- Göran Stelin – mastering (at Polar Music Studios, Stockholm)
- Stig Anderson; Thomas Johansson – album coordinators
- David Edwards – studio coordinator
- Richard Evans (Icon) – design
- Tony McGee – photography
- Christoffer Edwick; Tusse Nilsson – photography assistants
- Lolo Murray – stylist

== Charts ==
Weekly chart performance for Eyes of a Woman
| Chart (1985) | Peak position |
|---|---|
| Dutch Albums (Album Top 100) | 19 |
| European Albums (Music & Media) | 22 |
| German Albums (Offizielle Top 100) | 30 |
| Norwegian Albums (VG-lista) | 14 |
| Swedish Albums (Sverigetopplistan) | 2 |
| UK Albums (Official Charts) | 38 |
