= I Stand Alone (Agnetha Fältskog album) =

Studio album by Agnetha Fältskog
- Released: 9 November 1987
- Recorded: 1987
- Studios: Chartmaker Studios (Malibu, California); Additional recording: Skyline Recording (Topanga, California); That Studio (North Hollywood, California); Sun Valley Audio (Sun Valley, Idaho); Zebra Studio (Studio City, California)
- Genre: Pop rock
- Length: 41:41
- Label: WEA
- Producers: Peter Cetera; Bruce Gaitsch

Agnetha Fältskog chronology
Kom följ med i vår karusell (1987)	I Stand Alone (1987)	My Love, My Life (1996)

Singles from I Stand Alone
- 1. "The Last Time" Released: 15 January 1988; 2. "I Wasn't the One (Who Said Goodbye)" Released: January 1988; 3. "Let It Shine" Released: 12 September 1988

I Stand Alone is the third English-language solo studio album, and tenth overall, by Swedish singer and former ABBA member Agnetha Fältskog, first released on 9 November 1987 in Sweden by WEA Records. It was produced by former Chicago member Peter Cetera and would be her last album for 17 years.

Despite limited promotion, which included only music video recordings and a few interviews, the album managed to sell half a million copies.

== Overview ==
In 1978, Fältskog met Cetera in the UNICEF charity show, performing as part of their groups ABBA and Chicago. Cetera desired to collaborate with Fältskog in the future and had kept in touch. Cetera regularly sent songs that he thought were suitable for Fältskog. Slowly, but surely, the album took shape.

Recorded mainly in Los Angeles and Malibu, California, I Stand Alone was produced by Peter Cetera, the former singer and bass guitar player with American rock band Chicago. He duetted with Fältskog on the track "I Wasn't the One (Who Said Goodbye)", written by Mark Mueller and Aaron Zigman, which was a Top 20 Adult Contemporary Hit on the Billboard chart in the US. The co-producer of the album was Bruce Gaitsch, with whom Fältskog was in a relationship at the time. It was the first time after ABBA broke up that Fältskog worked under strict production management. Fältskog felt that I Stand Alone, despite the lack of her own songs, was her most personal album.

Fältskog made a very rare trip on an airplane to Los Angeles to record the album. After it was completed, she did not fly again for years due to her much-publicised fear of flying. She did, however, admit that the flight was worth it. The resulting musical style of the album was very different from the European sounds of Faltskog's previous two albums, and reflected the West Coast American influences of the producers. Fältskog had also refused to tour, disappointing the record company. The singer instead wanted to promote the album through shortcuts including videos and open-ended interviews, where presenters could record their own questions. Fältskog stated that she could afford to disagree with the record company, since she had largely financed the record herself.

The track "Love in a World Gone Mad" was a cover version of a song by British pop group Bucks Fizz, from their 1986 album Writing on the Wall.

Fältskog also made several promo videos for singles from the album, including "The Last Time" and "Let It Shine". When the third single, "I Wasn't the One (Who Said Goodbye)", appeared on the US Billboard Hot 100 in April 1988, Warner Music asked her to make another video immediately. Although it was a duet with Peter Cetera, he did not appear in the video.

On the cover of the album and in promotional interviews, Fältskog appeared with a "new" spiky blonde hair look. The album cover picture was taken by Alberto Tolot, who had transformed Fältskog's hair.

== Estoy sola ==
The album was released as Estoy sola for the Latin American market on LP and cassette in 1987. All of the song titles were translated into Spanish, but only two were actually re-recorded with new Spanish vocals by Fältskog and Cetera: "Yo no fui quién dijo adiós" ("I Wasn't the One (Who Said Goodbye)") and "La última vez" ("The Last Time"). The Spanish versions of these tracks were written by Cruz Baca Sembello.

== Reception ==
Upon its release, Music & Media picked I Stand Alone as their "Album of the Week". The magazine described the album as a "goldmine of hit singles" and noted its "crystalline production" and "stunningly good songwriting in 'Adult Contemporary' vein". Cash Box noted: "Faltskog shines on this Peter Cetera-produced project."

The album became Sweden's best-selling LP of 1988, where it remained at No. 1 for eight weeks. It also reached the Top 20 in Norway and the Netherlands, but fared less well on charts elsewhere, only reaching No. 47 in West Germany, No. 72 in the United Kingdom, No. 93 in Japan and No. 96 in Australia. "I Wasn't the One (Who Said Goodbye)" became Fältskog's second entry on the Billboard Hot 100 reaching No. 93. It also reached No. 19 on the Adult Contemporary chart in the US.

The album was picked as a "Lost Treasure" by the Smashing Pumpkins' frontman Billy Corgan. "She's one of my favourite singers of all time", he explained. "It's rare that a singer can hit super-high up the register and sound really good. When I look at the pop world today, I wish we had an ABBA. They had that right combination of fun, beauty, not taking it too seriously, but being deadly in the studio. Everyone's so goddamn serious these days."

== Track listing ==
Side one
No.	Title	Writer(s)	Length
1.	"The Last Time"	Robin Randall; Judithe Randall; Jeff Law	4:12
2.	"Little White Secrets"	Ellen Schwartz; Roger Bruno; Susan Pomerantz	4:04
3.	"I Wasn't the One (Who Said Goodbye)" (duet with Peter Cetera)	Mark Mueller; Aaron Zigman	4:10
4.	"Love in a World Gone Mad"	Billy Livsey; Pete Sinfield	4:08
5.	"Maybe It Was Magic"	Peter Brown; Pat Hurley	4:07

Side two
No.	Title	Writer(s)	Length
1.	"Let It Shine"	Austin Roberts; Bill LaBounty; Beckie Foster	3:58
2.	"We Got a Way"	John Robinson; Franne Golde; Martin Walsh	3:50
3.	"I Stand Alone"	Peter Cetera; Bruce Gaitsch	4:48
4.	"Are You Gonna Throw It All Away"	Diane Warren; Albert Hammond; Guy Roche	4:52
5.	"If You Need Somebody Tonight"	Warren; Hammond	3:32
Total length:			41:41

=== Estoy sola (Argentinian release) ===
For this release, all track titles were translated into Spanish. However, only "Yo no fui quién dijo adiós" and "La última vez" were re-recorded in Spanish by Fältskog and Cetera. The Spanish versions of these tracks were written by Cruz Baca Sembello.

Side one
No.	Title	Original title	Length
1.	"La última vez"	The Last Time	4:12
2.	"Pequeños secretos blancos"	Little White Secrets	4:04
3.	"Yo no fui quien dijo adiós"	I Wasn't the One (Who Said Goodbye)	4:10
4.	"Amor en un mundo vuelto loco"	Love in a World Gone Mad	4:08
5.	"Tal vez eso era mágico"	Maybe It Was Magic	4:07

Side two
No.	Title	Original title	Length
1.	"Déjalo que brille"	Let It Shine	3:58
2.	"Tenemos un modo"	We Got a Way	3:50
3.	"Estoy sola"	I Stand Alone	4:48
4.	"¿Vas a abandonarlo todo?"	Are You Gonna Throw It All Away	4:52
5.	"Si necesitas a alguien esta noche"	If You Need Somebody Tonight	3:32
Total length:			41:41

== Personnel ==
Adapted from the album's liner notes.

Musicians

- Agnetha Fältskog – lead vocals, backing vocals
- Peter Cetera – co-lead vocals (3), backing vocals
- Kenny Cetera; Darlene Koldenhoven; Linda Harmon – backing vocals
- Bruce Gaitsch – guitars
- John Robinson – drums
- Randy Waldman – piano, synthesizers
- Robbie Buchanan – synthesizers, bells, whistles
- Paulinho da Costa – percussion
- Neil Stubenhaus – bass guitar
- David Boruff – saxophone
- Tommy Morgan – harmonica

Production

- Peter Cetera – producer
- Bruce Gaitsch – co-producer, synthesizer programming
- Rick Holbrook – engineer, mixing (at Lion Share Recording Studios)
- Britt Bacon – assistant engineer (at Skyline Recording, Topanga, California)
- Karen Siegel – mixing assistant
- Wally Traugott – mastering (at Capitol Mastering, Hollywood, California)
- Ivy Skoff – production coordinator
- Alberto Tolot – photography
- Cesare Zucca – styling
- Peter Savic – hair
- Gary Berkowitz – make-up

== Charts ==
Weekly chart performance for I Stand Alone
Chart (1987–1988)	Peak position
Australian Albums (Kent Music Report)	96
Dutch Albums (Album Top 100)	19
European Albums (Music & Media)	55
German Albums (Offizielle Top 100)	47
Japanese Albums (Oricon)	93
Norwegian Albums (VG-lista)	15
Swedish Albums (Sverigetopplistan)	1
UK Albums (Official Charts)	72

== Release history ==
Release formats for I Stand Alone
Region	Date	Edition(s)	Format(s)	Label(s)	Ref.
Sweden	9 November 1987	Standard	CD; LP; Cassette	WEA	
Europe	15 January 1988	Standard	CD; LP; Cassette	WEA	
North America	15 February 1988	Standard	CD; LP; Cassette	Atlantic	
United Kingdom	7 March 1988	Standard	CD; LP; Cassette	WEA	
Japan	25 March 1988	Standard	CD; LP; Cassette	WEA	
Australia	11 April 1988	Standard	CD; LP; Cassette	WEA	
