= Ola Håkansson =

Swedish singer, composer and producer (born 1945)

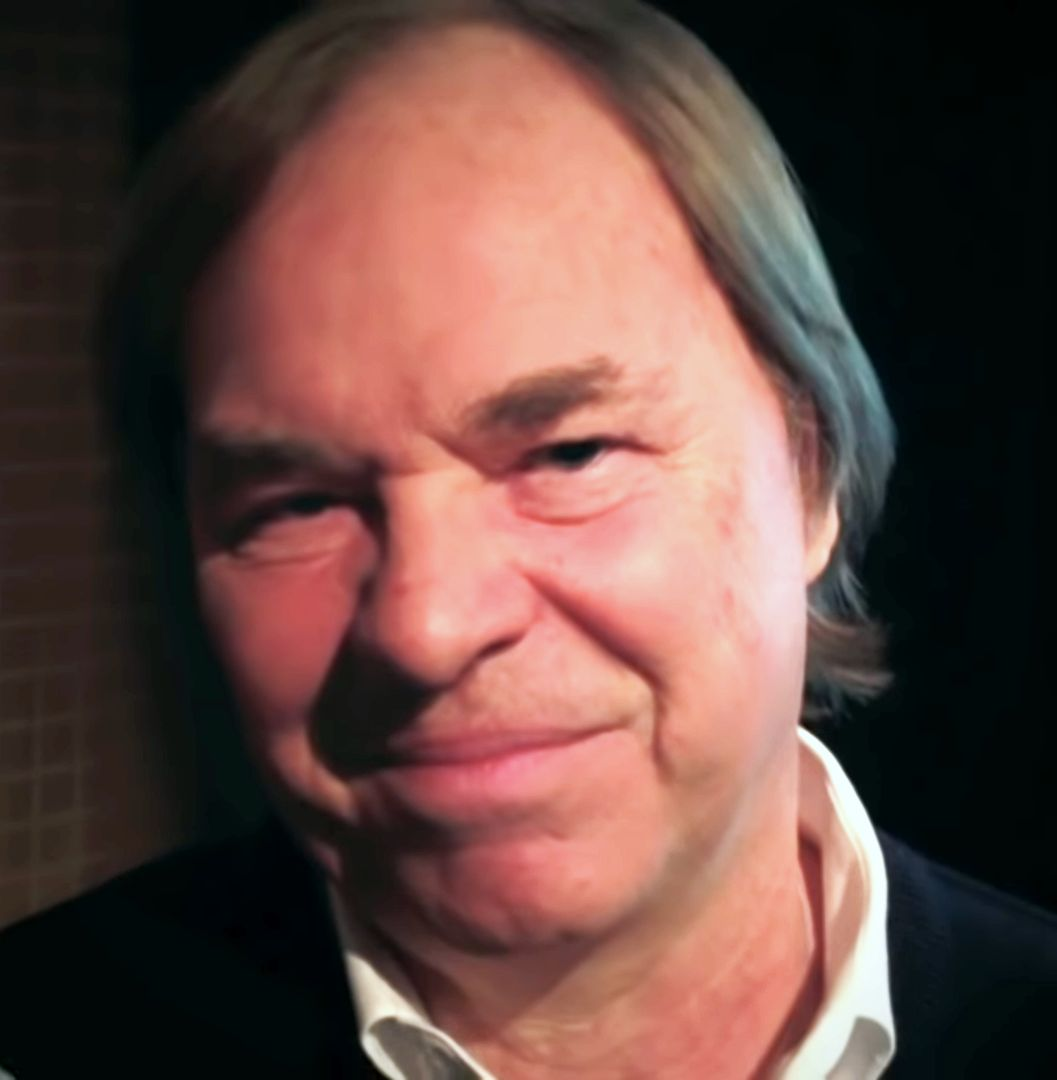
- Born: 24 March 1945 (age 81); Stockholm, Sweden
- Occupations: Singer, composer and producer
- Organisation(s): Founder and CEO of TEN Music Group; Founder of Stockholm Records
- Children: 5

Ola Håkansson (born 24 March 1945) is a Swedish singer, composer and producer. He is the founder and CEO of TEN Music Group, a Swedish independent record label. He also founded Stockholm Records, another record label and a subsidiary of UMG. In 2012 Ola started 100 SONGS, a record label focused on releasing singles.

Ola Håkansson was born 24 March 1945 in Stockholm. He was the singer of the band Ola and the Janglers and later Secret Service. In 1986 he recorded the duets "The Way You Are" and "Fly Like The Eagle" with Agnetha Fältskog.

He was part of the songwriting trio Norell Oson Bard. In 1992, with Alexander Bard, Håkansson founded the independent record company Stockholm Records.

He has four sons, Andreas, Viktor, David and Ludvig, and a daughter, Linnéa Håkansson.

== Filmography ==
- Ola & Julia (1967) by Jan Halldoff
