= I Won't Let You Go (Agnetha Fältskog song) =

Single by Agnetha Fältskog

from the album Eyes of a Woman
- B-side: "You're There"
- Released: 1 April 1985
- Recorded: 1985
- Genre: Eurodisco; bubblegum pop
- Length: 3:40
- Label: Polar Music
- Songwriters: Agnetha Fältskog; Eric Stewart
- Producer: Eric Stewart

Agnetha Fältskog singles chronology
"It's So Nice to Be Rich" (1984)	"I Won't Let You Go" (1985)	"One Way Love" (1985)

"I Won't Let You Go" is a song by Swedish singer Agnetha Fältskog, released on 1 April 1985 as the lead single from her second English solo studio album, Eyes of a Woman (1985). The song was composed by Fältskog with lyrics by producer Eric Stewart, formerly of the group 10cc.

The track reached number one in Denmark and the top 10 in Sweden and Belgium, while peaking at number 84 in the United Kingdom.

The B-side of the single, "You're There", was also written by Fältskog and was the last song written by her to be released until "I Keep Them On The Floor Beside My Bed", which was the closing track on her 2013 album, A.

In some countries, a 12-inch single was released that featured an extended remix instead of the album version.

== Critical reception ==
Eleanor Levy of Record Mirror negatively reviewed the track, describing it as a "sub-standard bubbly Euro-disco record."

== Charts ==
Weekly chart performance for "I Won't Let You Go"
Chart (1985)	Peak position
Belgium (Ultratop 50 Flanders)	7
Denmark (Tracklisten)	1
Europe (European Top 100 Singles)	55
Netherlands (Dutch Top 40)	18
Netherlands (Single Top 100)	17
Sweden (Sverigetopplistan)	6
UK Singles (OCC)	84
West Germany (GfK)	24

=== Year-end charts ===
Year-end chart performance for "I Won't Let You Go"
Chart (1985)	Position
Belgium (Ultratop 50 Flanders)	69
