= Gareth Gates discography =

- Studio albums: 3
- Compilation albums: 1
- Singles: 9
- Music videos: 9

The discography of English singer-songwriter Gareth Gates consists of three studio albums, nine singles, nine music videos and one live DVD. Gates rose to fame after appearing as a contestant on the first series of British television talent contest Pop Idol in 2002. After finishing as runner-up behind Will Young, Gates was given a recording contract with BMG and released his first single, a cover of "Unchained Melody", which was a number-one hit in the UK in March 2002. He went on to have three further number one singles in the UK Singles Chart (one of which was a duet with Young) and three albums that reached the top 30, including his debut album which reached number two in the UK Albums Chart.

== Albums ==
=== Studio albums ===
List of studio albums, with selected details, chart positions and certifications
Title	Album details	Peak chart positions									Certifications (sales thresholds)
Title	Album details	UK	AUS	AUT	GER	IRE	NL	NOR	SWE	SWI	Certifications (sales thresholds)
What My Heart Wants to Say	Released: 9 November 2002; Label: Sony BMG; Formats: CD, digital download	2	—	52	10	19	11	8	52	84	BPI: 2× Platinum
Go Your Own Way	Released: 4 October 2003; Label: Sony BMG; Formats: CD, digital download	11	85	59	24	—	40	34	—	40	BPI: Gold
Pictures of the Other Side	Released: 7 July 2007; Label: 19/UMTV; Formats: CD, digital download	23	—	47	—	—	—	99	—	—	

=== Compilation albums ===
List of compilation albums, with selected details
Title	Album details
The Very Best of Gareth Gates	Released: 7 March 2014; Label: 19/UMTV; Formats: CD, digital download

== Singles ==
List of singles, with selected chart positions and certifications
Title	Year	Peak chart positions										Certifications	Album
Title	Year	UK	AUT	BEL (FL)	FRA	GER	IRE	NL	NOR	SWE	SWI	Certifications	Album
"Unchained Melody"	2002	1	—	15	4	17	1	12	—	—	18	BPI: 2× Platinum	What My Heart Wants to Say
"Anyone of Us (Stupid Mistake)"	2002	1	6	3	—	3	2	1	1	1	24	BPI: Platinum	What My Heart Wants to Say
"The Long and Winding Road" (with Will Young) / "Suspicious Minds"	2002	1	—	—	—	—	4	—	—	—	—	BPI: Gold	What My Heart Wants to Say
"What My Heart Wants to Say"	2002	5	—	—	—	—	20	—	16	—	52		What My Heart Wants to Say
"Spirit in the Sky" (featuring The Kumars)	2003	1	10	—	—	13	2	11	—	—	30	BPI: Platinum	Go Your Own Way
"Sunshine"	2003	3	—	—	—	71	20	77	—	—	—		Go Your Own Way
"Say It Isn't So"	2003	4	46	—	—	26	27	—	—	—	74		Go Your Own Way
"Changes"	2007	14	—	—	—	—	—	—	—	—	—		Pictures of the Other Side
"Angel on My Shoulder"	2007	22	—	—	—	—	—	—	—	—	—		Pictures of the Other Side

== Music videos ==
List of music videos
Title	Year	Director(s)
"Unchained Melody"	2002	
"Anyone of Us (Stupid Mistake)"	2002	
"The Long and Winding Road"	2002	
"Suspicious Minds"	2002	
"What My Heart Wants to Say"	2002	
"Spirit in the Sky"	2003	
"Sunshine"	2003	
"Say It Isn't So"	2003	
"Changes"	2007	Andy Hylton
"Angel on My Shoulder"	2007	
