= Angel on My Shoulder (disambiguation) =

Angel on My Shoulder is a 1946 film starring Paul Muni.

Angel on My Shoulder may refer to:

== Music ==
- Angel on My Shoulder, a 2008 live album by Sonia Leigh
- "Angel on My Shoulder" (Gareth Gates song), 2007
- "Angel on My Shoulder" (Shelby Flint song), 1960, covered by various other artists
- "Angel on My Shoulder", a song by Kaskade with Tamra Keenan, c. 2008

== Other media ==
- Angel on My Shoulder (1980 film), a TV movie directed by John Berry starring Peter Strauss
- Angel on My Shoulder, a 2000 autobiography by singer Natalie Cole

== See also ==
- Shoulder angel
