= I Should've Followed You Home =

2013 song by Agnetha Fältskog

Single by Agnetha Fältskog and Gary Barlow

from the album A
- Released: 18 November 2013 (Digital)
- Recorded: 2012
- Genre: Pop
- Length: 4:04
- Label: Universal Music
- Songwriters: Gary Barlow, Jörgen Elofsson
- Producers: Jörgen Elofsson, Peter Nordahl

Agnetha Fältskog singles chronology
"Dance Your Pain Away" (2013)	"I Should've Followed You Home" (2013)	"Where Do We Go from Here?" (2023)

Gary Barlow singles chronology
"Let Me Go" (2013)	"I Should've Followed You Home" (2013)	"Face to Face" (2014)

"I Should've Followed You Home" is a duet sung by Swedish recording artist and ABBA member Agnetha Fältskog and British singer-songwriter and Take That frontman Gary Barlow. Written by Barlow and producer Jörgen Elofsson, it was the third single taken from A.

== Background ==
On 12 November 2013 Fältskog sang live "I Should've Followed You Home" at the BBC Children in Need Rocks 2013 concert in London. She sang the song with Gary Barlow, the organiser of the event, this being her first live performance for 25 years.

== A+ version ==
"I Should’ve Followed You Home (A+ Version)"

Single by Agnetha Fältskog and Gary Barlow

from the album A+
- Released: 29 September 2023
- Genre: Pop
- Length: 4:05
- Label: BMG
- Songwriters: Gary Barlow, Jörgen Elofsson

Agnetha Fältskog singles chronology
"Where Do We Go from Here?" (2023)	"I Should’ve Followed You Home (A+ Version)" (2023)

On 31 August 2023, Faltskog announced a re-recorded version of her 2013 album 'A'. The track listing has stayed the same (with the exception of her new single 'Where Do We Go From Here?'), however the order of the songs has changed. 'I Should've Followed You Home' is the 3rd song on the album, where as previously it was 5th.

On 27 September 2023, Faltskog's various social media accounts announced that the A+ version of 'I Should've Followed You Home' would be released digitally on 29 September 2023. On Spotify, the single also included 'Where Do We Go From Here?'

== Promotional video ==
The video premiered at YouTube on 18 November 2013, the same day as the release of the single itself.

== Track listing ==
=== Original version ===
Digital download
No.	Title	Version	Length
1.	"I Should've Followed You Home"	7th Heaven Radio Edit	4.51
2.	"I Should've Followed You Home"	Album version	4.04
3.	"I Should've Followed You Home"	7th Heaven Club Mix	7:36
4.	"I Should've Followed You Home"	7th Heaven Dub	7:15
Total length:			23:46

=== A+ version ===
Digital download
No.	Title	Version	Length
1.	"I Should've Followed You Home"	A+	4:05
Total length:			4:05

Digital download - Spotify release
No.	Title	Version	Length
1.	"I Should've Followed You Home"	A+	4:05
2.	"Where Do We Go From Here?"		3:13
Total length:			7:19

== Chart performance ==
Chart (2013)	Peak position
Swedish Svensktoppen	4
UK Singles (Official Charts)	99
UK Singles Downloads (Official Charts)	96
