= When You Really Loved Someone =

Single by Agnetha Fältskog

from the album A
- Released: March 11, 2013 (Digital), April 15, 2013 (CD single), May 6, 2013 (7" Picture Disc)
- Recorded: 2012
- Genre: Pop
- Length: 3:31
- Label: Universal Music
- Songwriter: Jörgen Elofsson
- Producers: Jörgen Elofsson, Peter Nordahl

Agnetha Fältskog singles chronology
"The One Who Loves You Now" (2013)	"When You Really Loved Someone" (2013)	"Dance Your Pain Away" (2013)

Professional ratings
Review scores
Source	Rating
Aftonbladet	link
Expressen	link

"When You Really Loved Someone" is a song by Swedish recording artist and current ABBA member Agnetha Fältskog. Released internationally on March 11, 2013, it was the first single from her fifth English solo album, A.

== General information ==
"When You Really Loved Someone" was by written and produced by Swedish songwriter and producer Jörgen Elofsson. The sound of the song and the album can be described as "very mature and worthy", according to Fältskog herself.

== Critical reception ==
Upon its release, the single received a lot of media coverage, mostly in the context of Fältskog's musical comeback and news about the forthcoming album. The Swedish media reviewed the song, calling it an "epic ballad", and highlighting its acoustic elements, like strings, guitars as well as the sweet harmonies. Swedish newspaper Aftonbladet pointed out the contrast between production and musical elements from the 1970s and the synth-loop in the latter half of the song, which would also suit for the likes of Britney Spears. Online portal Musikindustrin referred to these elements as "charming 80's synths".

== Promotional video ==
In order to promote the song, a video for "When You Really Loved Someone" was shot, featuring Fältskog herself as well as actors Max Fowler and Camilla Rowland. The scenes with Agnetha Fältskog were shot at Ulriksdal Palace, the same location as the shooting of most promotion pictures for Fältskog's current album project. Rowland, who apparently plays a young Fältskog, and Fowler, portraying her lover, shot their scenes in London. The video was directed by Simon Fowler, produced by Beau Fowler and designed by Blair Barnette.

The video premiered on YouTube on March 11, 2013, the same day as the release of the single itself.

== Remixes ==
Two official remixes of "When You Really Loved Someone" were made available.

== A+ Version -2023 ==
On the 31st August 2023, Faltskog announced her reimagined version of her 2013 album 'A'. The track listing has stayed the same (with the exception of her new single 'Where Do We Go From Here?'); however, the order of the songs has changed. 'When You Really Loved Someone' is the 10th song on the album, whereas previously it was 2nd.

== Formats and track listing ==
Digital download
No.	Title	Length
1.	"When You Really Loved Someone"	3:31

Digital remixes
No.	Title	Length
1.	"When You Really Loved Someone" (The Alias Club Mix)	6:31
2.	"When You Really Loved Someone" (The Alias Radio Edit)	3:25
Total length:		9:56

== Chart performance ==
In the days after its release, "When You Really Loved Someone" entered the Swedish iTunes top10, peaking at number 3 behind the winner of Melodifestivalen 2013, Robin Stjernberg with his song "You". As a result of its good performance in the daily iTunes chart, the song eventually entered the Swedish DigiListan download chart at number 4 on March 24.

In the end of April, BBC Radio 2 made "When You Really Loved Someone" Record of the Week and subsequently placed the song in its A List, which meant that it would be played between 15 and 20 times per week. As a result, "When You Really Loved Someone" started rising in the UK Airplay Chart, eventually entering the top 30 in the first week of May 2013 with 273 plays and 23.89m impacts.

=== Weekly charts ===
Chart (2013)	Peak position
Belgium (Ultratip Bubbling Under Flanders)	19
CIS Airplay (TopHit)	193
Netherlands (Single Top 100)	76
Polish Singles Chart	15
Swedish DigiListan	4
Swedish Svensktoppen	3
UK Radio Airplay Chart	29

== Radio and release history ==
Country	Date	Format	Label
International (except Germany and Austria)	March 11, 2013	Digital download	Universal Music Group
International (except Germany and Austria)	April 15, 2013	CD single	Universal Music Group
