= Dance Your Pain Away =

Single by Agnetha Fältskog

from the album A
- Released: 28 May 2013 (US); 15 July 2013 (International)
- Recorded: 2012
- Genre: Dance-pop; disco
- Length: 4:10
- Label: Universal Music
- Songwriter(s): Jörgen Elofsson
- Producer(s): Jörgen Elofsson, Peter Nordahl

Agnetha Fältskog singles chronology
"When You Really Loved Someone" (2013)	"Dance Your Pain Away" (2013)	"I Should've Followed You Home" (2013)

"Dance Your Pain Away" is the second international single from the album A by Swedish recording artist and former ABBA member Agnetha Fältskog. It was released on 28 May 2013 in the United States, and on 15 July 2013 worldwide.

== General information ==
"Dance Your Pain Away" is an uptempo pop song, much more upbeat compared with the previous single "When You Really Loved Someone". The single was added to BBC Radio 2's 'A' list in July 2013, quickly reaching number one on their airplay chart before the single was released.

== Competition ==
A competition was held on Agnetha's official website where fans were invited to submit videos to YouTube of themselves dancing to the song. Visitors to the site could vote for their favourite videos. The Top 10 videos by vote were selected to feature in the official video clip for the song.

== A+ Version -2023 ==
On 31 August 2023, Faltskog announced her reimagined version of her 2013 album 'A'. The track listing stayed the same (with the exception of her new single 'Where Do We Go From Here?'); however, the order of the songs was changed: 'Dance Your Pain Away' is the 4th song on the album, whereas previously it was 7th.

== Formats and track listing ==
SE CD Maxi
No.	Title	Version	Length
1.	"Dance Your Pain Away"	Album Version	4:10
2.	"Dance Your Pain Away"	Cahill Mix Edit	3:50
3.	"Dance Your Pain Away"	Patrolla Mix Edit	3:30
4.	"Dance Your Pain Away"	7th Heaven Mirrorball Mix	7:51
Total length:			18:41

US Digital download
No.	Title	Version	Length
1.	"Dance Your Pain Away"	Album Version	4:10
2.	"Dance Your Pain Away"	Smash Mode Remix	4:07
3.	"Dance Your Pain Away"	Smash Mode Extended	4:47
Total length:			13:04

== Chart performance ==
Chart (2013)	Peak position
Swedish DigiListan	60
UK Radio Airplay Chart	25
UK BBC Radio 2 Airplay Chart	1
