= The One Who Loves You Now =

Single by Agnetha Fältskog

from the album A
- Released: March 11, 2013
- Recorded: 2012
- Genre: Pop, easy listening
- Length: 3:30
- Label: Universal Music
- Songwriters: Jörgen Elofsson, Pär Westerlund
- Producers: Jörgen Elofsson, Peter Nordahl

Agnetha Fältskog singles chronology
"Sometimes When I'm Dreaming" (2004)	"The One Who Loves You Now" (2013)	"When You Really Loved Someone" (2013)

"The One Who Loves You Now" is a song by Swedish recording artist and former ABBA member Agnetha Fältskog. It was released in Germany and Austria on March 11, 2013 as the first single off her 5th English solo album "A". Internationally, the first single from "A" was When You Really Loved Someone. The song was released as a single on CD in the United Kingdom on November 25, 2013.

== Background ==
"The One Who Loves You Now" was written by Jörgen Elofsson together with Pär Westerlund a few years before Fältskog was approached to make a recording. Though the song wasn't written with Fältskog in mind, it was one of the first songs that Elofsson played to her when discussing a possible future album project. Fältskog apparently liked the song very much and chose to record it as the first track for her album A. When asked about the final result, Pär Westerlund stated that the song "sounds very good" and that he was "very proud to be involved in that project".

== A+ Version -2023 ==
On the 31st August 2023, Faltskog Announced her reimagined version of her 2013 album 'A'. The Track listing has stayed the same (With the exception of her new single 'Where Do We Go From Here?') however the order of the songs has changed. 'The One Who Loves You Now' is the 8th song on the album, where as previously it was 1st.

== Chart performance ==
=== Weekly charts ===
Chart (2013)	Peak position
Germany (GfK)	71

== Radio and release history ==
Country	Date	Format	Label
Germany and Austria	March 11, 2013	Digital download	Universal Music Group
