= A (Agnetha Fältskog album) =

Studio album by Agnetha Fältskog
- Released: 10 May 2013
- Recorded: January–October 2012
- Studios: Atlantis, Stockholm, Sweden; Lighthouse, Lidingö, Sweden
- Genres: Pop; easy listening
- Length: 38:37
- Label: Universal
- Producers: Jörgen Elofsson; Peter Nordahl

Agnetha Fältskog chronology
My Very Best (2008)	A (2013)	A+ (2023)

Singles from A
- 1. "The One Who Loves You Now" Released: 11 March 2013; 2. "When You Really Loved Someone" Released: 11 March 2013; 3. "Dance Your Pain Away" Released: 15 July 2013; 4. "I Should've Followed You Home" Released: 18 November 2013

Singles from A+
- 1. "Where Do We Go from Here?" Released: 31 August 2023; 2. "I Should've Followed You Home (A+)" Released: 29 September 2023; 3. "Dance Your Pain Away (A+)"/"Perfume in the Breeze (A+)" Released: 6 October 2023; 4. "Back on Your Radio (A+)" Released: 2 November 2023; 5. "I Keep Them on the Floor Beside My Bed (The Christmas Edition)" Released: 10 November 2023

Professional ratings
Aggregate scores
Source	Rating
Metacritic	62/100
Review scores
Source	Rating
Aftonbladet	3/5 stars
AllMusic	3/5 stars
The Daily Telegraph	3/5 stars
Evening Chronicle	9/10 stars
Expressen	3/5 stars
The Independent	4/5 stars
The Press	5/5 stars
Rolling Stone Germany	3.5/5 stars
Svenska Dagbladet	4/6 stars
The Times	4/5 stars

A is the fifth English-language studio album by Swedish singer Agnetha Fältskog, a member of the group ABBA. It is her twelfth studio album overall.

A is Fältskog's first album since 2004's My Colouring Book, an album of cover versions of her favourite songs from the 1960s, and the first original material she had recorded since I Stand Alone in 1987. It also includes her first self-penned track in nearly 30 years, "I Keep Them on the Floor Beside My Bed".

A+, a reissue of the album, was released on 13 October 2023. The reissue has 11 reimagined versions of the album tracks and a new single, "Where Do We Go from Here?". The latter is Fältskog's first new material in 10 years.

On 27 September 2023, Fältskog's various social media accounts announced that the A+ version of "I Should've Followed You Home" would be released on 29 September 2023. On 6 October 2023, two further re-recorded tracks ("Dance Your Pain Away" and "Perfume in the Breeze") were released as part of the Music from A+ EP.

== Background ==
As Fältskog was not an active recording artist at the time, the album happened in a roundabout way. "The project came about through a good friend of mine", she explained. "She called me up and told me that Jörgen Elofsson and Peter Nordahl wanted to play me some music. They came to my house and played me three songs and I thought, 'Oh my God, I have to do this'. It felt like a challenge."

Ten tracks were recorded for the album at Atlantis Studios in Stockholm, all of which were written or co-written by Elofsson.

Speaking with author Paul Stenning, Elofsson explained, "Agnetha is not just any artist, she is an icon with a rich heritage. We really felt the pressure of making something great, we didn't want to destroy anything for ABBA or Agnetha given the reputation they've built over the years. I'm really happy to say I think we pulled it off!"

The lead single from the album was "When You Really Loved Someone", which was released worldwide on 11 March 2013 as a digital download, with a CD single following on 15 April. A video clip for the song was filmed in late 2012, with Max Fowler and Camilla Rowling co-starring with Fältskog. In Germany and Austria the lead single was "The One Who Loves You Now", also released on 11 March 2013.

The track "I Should've Followed You Home" is a duet recorded with Gary Barlow of the British group Take That. Both artists recorded their vocal parts separately, as Fältskog was on holiday at the time of Barlow's recording session. Nevertheless, Fältskog stated, "I think our voices work so well together." The song had its radio premiere on 21 April on a Dutch radio station.

"I Was a Flower" is a string-attached piano ballad, produced and performed in a theatrical way. On 22 April, the song was made available for download only through Amazon.

"I Keep Them on the Floor Beside My Bed" is the first track Fältskog has written herself that has been released since "I Won't Let You Go"—the lead single from her 1985 album Eyes of a Woman—and its B-side "You're There". Fältskog commented, "Jorgen kept saying 'You have to write a song for this record'. I hadn't written any music for a long, long time. But I sat at the piano and suddenly it was there. A friend of mine said a lovely thing: 'It's in your spine. Even if you feel tired, when it's time, it will be there'."

Other tracks on the album include the contemplative "Bubble", the disco "Dance Your Pain Away", the pop "Back on Your Radio", and the piano-led "Past Forever".

== Promotion ==
Fältskog appeared on stage at G-A-Y in London on 4 May 2013 to promote the album. Although she did not perform, 10 fans had the chance to meet her backstage after the appearance. On 1 August 2013 she appeared on stage at Stockholm Gay Pride, where she was presented with her Gold record award for sales of the album in Sweden.

In the same week of the announcement of her album release, Fältskog was a guest on the Norwegian-Swedish television talk show Skavlan. The show was filmed on 14 March 2013 and aired the next day.

The Seven Network in Australia aired a special edition of the programme Sunday Night at 6:30pm on 5 May 2013 focusing on Fältskog and including new interview material shot in Sweden in late April. A television commercial for the album was shown as well. Due to popular demand, the programme showed other unaired portions of the interview on 12 May 2013.

Fältskog filmed a documentary for the BBC in mid-April, titled Agnetha: Abba and After, which aired in the UK on 11 June. Afterwards the album returned to the UK Top 40, w/e 16 June 2013, to its peak position of 6, and to a new high of number 9 on the UK Album Download Chart. This special was also aired on the Nine Network in Australia in prime time on 2 July 2013, sending the album back up to number 5 in Australia.

Whilst in London in late April and early May, Fältskog was interviewed by Patricia Schäfer for the German television station ZDF. On 2 May, the interview was broadcast on several TV programs, most prominently the society report Leute Heute.

The May edition of UK gay publication Attitude magazine featured an extensive new interview with Fältskog. The German gay publication Exit also featured an interview in April. In the UK and Ireland The Big Issue featured Fältskog on the cover of their June edition along with an interview about her life.

== Reception ==
BBC News called A a "tasteful and sumptuous" mid-tempo album; the disco song "Dance Your Pain Away" was noted as the only exception to the general tempo, its bassline reminiscent of ABBA's "Voulez-Vous". In a review of the album, The Times gave the album four out of five stars, calling A "a triumphant return to form by a woman presumed lost to music forever". Helen Brown awarded the album three out of five stars in a review in The Daily Telegraph, dubbing the album "as beautifully boring as ever".

Other publications, such as the German newspaper Die Zeit, highlighted Fältskog's voice, saying it sounds young and fresh and "like a young Agnetha would sound today".

The album received Gold certifications two months after its release in Australia (35,000 copies), the United Kingdom (100,000 copies), Germany (100,000 copies) and Sweden (20,000 copies).

== A+ ==
In 2023, Fältskog announced that a reimagined version of A would be released, titled A+. She shared, "A couple of years ago I heard one of the songs from my last album on the radio. I have lots of fond memories from making that album, so I couldn’t help but smile [...] Suddenly it hit me, what would the album sound like if we had made it today...? I couldn’t stop thinking about it. I reached out to the boys who produced A back in 2013 – "What would you guys think about reimagining A and making a totally new version of it?" They loved the idea!" The album was released on 13 October 2023.

== Track listing ==
=== Original version ===
No.	Title	Writer(s)	Length
1.	"The One Who Loves You Now"	Jörgen Elofsson; Pär Westerlund	3:30
2.	"When You Really Loved Someone"	Elofsson	3:31
3.	"Perfume in the Breeze"	Elofsson; Fredrik Thomander	3:31
4.	"I Was a Flower"	Elofsson	4:08
5.	"I Should've Followed You Home" (with Gary Barlow)	Barlow; Elofsson	4:04
6.	"Past Forever"	Elofsson; Carole Bayer Sager	3:30
7.	"Dance Your Pain Away"	Elofsson	4:10
8.	"Bubble"	Elofsson	4:21
9.	"Back on Your Radio"	Elofsson	3:43
10.	"I Keep Them on the Floor Beside My Bed"	Agnetha Fältskog; Elofsson	4:06

Amazon Germany exclusive digital bonus track
No.	Title	Writer(s)	Length
11.	"I Was a Flower" (orchestral version)	Elofsson	4:11

Notes

- Commentary for each track by Fältskog and producer Jörgen Elofsson was made available with the release of A on Spotify.

=== A+ version ===
No.	Title	Writer(s)	Length
1.	"Where Do We Go from Here?"	Elofsson; Bayrak	3:13
2.	"Back on Your Radio" (A+ version)	Elofsson	3:25
3.	"I Should've Followed You Home" (with Gary Barlow; A+ version)	Barlow; Elofsson	4:05
4.	"Dance Your Pain Away" (A+ version)	Elofsson	3:57
5.	"I Was a Flower" (A+ version)	Elofsson	3:30
6.	"Perfume in the Breeze" (A+ version)	Elofsson; Thomander	3:17
7.	"Past Forever" (A+ version)	Elofsson; Sager	3:46
8.	"The One Who Loves You Now" (A+ version)	Elofsson; Westerlund	3:13
9.	"Bubble" (A+ version)	Elofsson	3:53
10.	"When You Really Loved Someone" (A+ version)	Elofsson	2:58
11.	"I Keep Them on the Floor Beside My Bed" (A+ version)	Fältskog; Elofsson	4:06

== Personnel ==
Credits adapted from the liner notes of A.

- Agnetha Fältskog – lead vocals, backing vocals
- Gary Barlow – vocals (track 5)
- Gustaf Berg – engineering assistance
- Michael Dahlvid – engineering assistance
- Andy Earl – photography
- Jörgen Elofsson – backing vocals, production, recording, recording engineering, vocal arrangements, vocal conducting
- Janne Hansson – recording engineering
- Micke Herrström – recording engineering
- Jesper Jacobson – guitar, keyboards
- Janet Leon – backing vocals
- Per Lindvall – drums
- Max Lorentz – organ
- Bob Ludwig – mastering
- Myrra Malmberg – backing vocals
- Lasse Nilsson – recording engineering
- Peter Nordahl – orchestra arrangements, orchestra conducting, piano, production
- Gunnar Nordén – bass, guitar
- Jeanette Ohlsson – backing vocals
- Jeanette Olsson – guitar
- Simon Petrén – keyboards, programming
- Matt Read – art direction
- Niklas Sundén – accordion
- Jess Sutcliffe – mixing
- Fredrik Thomander – backing vocals, guitar keyboards, programming
- Mattias Torell – guitar
- Linda Ulvaeus – backing vocals
- Pär Westerlund – keyboards, programming

== Charts ==
=== Weekly charts ===
2013 weekly chart performance for A
Chart (2013)	Peak position
Australian Albums (ARIA)	3
Austrian Albums (Ö3 Austria)	8
Belgian Albums (Ultratop Flanders)	6
Belgian Albums (Ultratop Wallonia)	35
Danish Albums (Hitlisten)	2
Dutch Albums (Album Top 100)	5
Finnish Albums (Suomen virallinen lista)	15
French Albums (SNEP)	85
German Albums (Offizielle Top 100)	3
Irish Albums (IRMA)	18
New Zealand Albums (RMNZ)	27
Norwegian Albums (VG-lista)	3
Polish Albums (ZPAV)	38
Scottish Albums (Official Charts)	5
Swedish Albums (Sverigetopplistan)	2
Swiss Albums (Schweizer Hitparade)	2
UK Albums (Official Charts)	6
US Billboard 200	186

2018 weekly chart performance for A
Chart (2018)	Peak position
Czech Albums (ČNS IFPI)	21

Chart performance for A+
Chart (2023)	Peak position
Australian Albums (ARIA)	94
Austrian Albums (Ö3 Austria)	6
Belgian Albums (Ultratop Flanders)	10
Belgian Albums (Ultratop Wallonia)	31
Dutch Albums (Album Top 100)	9
German Albums (Offizielle Top 100)	5
Scottish Albums (Official Charts)	12
Swedish Albums (Sverigetopplistan)	8
Swiss Albums (Schweizer Hitparade)	3
UK Albums (Official Charts)	48
UK Independent Albums (Official Charts)	7

=== Year-end charts ===
Year-end chart performance for A
Chart (2013)	Position
Australian Albums (ARIA)	67
Belgian Albums (Ultratop Flanders)	156
Danish Albums (Hitlisten)	92
German Albums (Offizielle Top 100)	90
Swedish Albums (Sverigetopplistan)	12
UK Albums (OCC)	98

== Certifications ==
Certifications for A
Region	Certification	Certified units/sales
Australia (ARIA)	Gold	35,000^{^}
Germany (BVMI)	Gold	100,000^{^}
Sweden (GLF)	Gold	20,000^{‡}
United Kingdom (BPI)	Gold	100,000^{*}
^{*} Sales figures based on certification alone.^{^} Shipments figures based on certification alone.^{‡} Sales+streaming figures based on certification alone.

== Release history ==
Release history for A
Region	Date	Label	Ref.
Australia	10 May 2013	Universal	
Germany	10 May 2013	Universal	
France	13 May 2013	Universal	
Sweden	13 May 2013	Universal	
United Kingdom	13 May 2013	Polydor	
United States	14 May 2013	Verve	
Poland	14 May 2013	Universal	
Italy	21 May 2013	Universal	
Japan	2 April 2014	Universal	
