= Where Do We Go from Here? (Agnetha Fältskog song) =

Single by Agnetha Fältskog

from the album A+
- Released: 31 August 2023
- Genre: Pop
- Length: 3:13
- Label: BMG
- Songwriters: Jörgen Elofsson; Kamilla Bayrak
- Producers: Jörgen Elofsson; Anton ”Hybrid” Mårtensson

Agnetha Fältskog singles chronology
"I Should've Followed You Home" (2013)	"Where Do We Go from Here?" (2023)	"I Should've Followed You Home (A+ Version)" (2023)

Music video
- "Where Do We Go From Here?" on YouTube

"Where Do We Go From Here?" is a song released by Agnetha Fältskog as the first single from her reissued 2013 album A, to be titled A+. The song, written by Jörgen Elofsson and Kamilla Bayrak premiered on BBC Radio 2 on 31 August 2023.

== Critical reception ==
The Telegraph, giving the song three out of five stars, called the song "quite forgettable", although it considered the song to be "a slice of well-constructed lightweight pop squarely aimed at the slinky mid-tempo territory of Dua Lipa".

== Music video ==
The animated music video for "Where Do We Go from Here?" was directed by Josh Twist and was released on Agnetha Fältskog's YouTube channel on September 6, 2023.

== Charts ==
Chart performance for "Where Do We Go from Here?"
Chart (2023)	Peak position
Svensktoppen	8
UK Singles Downloads (OCC)	25
UK Singles Sales (OCC)	27
