= Say It Isn't So (Gareth Gates song) =

2003 single by Gareth Gates

Single by Gareth Gates

from the album Go Your Own Way
- Released: 1 December 2003
- Length: 4:02
- Label: BMG; 19; S
- Songwriters: David Kreuger; Per Magnusson; Jörgen Elofsson
- Producers: David Kreuger; Per Magnusson

Gareth Gates singles chronology
"Sunshine" (2003)	"Say It Isn't So" (2003)	"Changes" (2007)

Music video
- "Say It Isn't So" on YouTube

"Say It Isn't So" was the third and final single to be released from Pop Idol runner-up Gareth Gates' second studio album, Go Your Own Way (2003). The single was released on 1 December 2003, peaking at number four on the UK Singles Chart. The video for the song was shot in South Africa.

== Track listings ==
UK CD1

1. "Say It Isn't So" (single mix)
2. "She Doesn't Even Know"
3. "Dance with Me"
4. "Say It Isn't So" (video)

UK CD2 and European CD single

1. "Say It Isn't So" – 4:03
2. "Sunshine" (T&F vs. Moltosugo radio edit) – 3:31

German mini-CD single

1. "Say It Isn't So" (single mix)
2. "She Doesn't Even Know"

== Charts ==
=== Weekly charts ===
Chart (2003–2004)	Peak position
Austria (Ö3 Austria Top 40)	46
Europe (Eurochart Hot 100)	18
Germany (GfK)	26
Ireland (IRMA)	27
Scotland Singles (OCC)	4
Switzerland (Schweizer Hitparade)	74
UK Singles (OCC)	4

=== Year-end charts ===
Chart (2003)	Position
UK Singles (OCC)	95
