= Go Your Own Way (album) =

Studio album by Gareth Gates
- Released: 22 September 2003
- Recorded: 2003
- Genre: Pop
- Length: 85:14
- Label: Sony BMG, RCA
- Producer: Mike Peden, Steve Mac, Quiz & Larossi, Bill Padley, Jem Godfrey, David Eriksen, Chris Braide, Rob Davis, Per Magnusson, David Kreuger, Absolute, Ed Johnson, Ryan Shaw

Gareth Gates chronology
What My Heart Wants to Say (2002)	Go Your Own Way (2003)	Pictures of the Other Side (2007)

Singles from Go Your Own Way
- 1. "Spirit in the Sky" Released: 10 March 2003; 2. "Sunshine" Released: 8 September 2003; 3. "Say It Isn't So" Released: 1 December 2003

Go Your Own Way is the second studio album released by British singer-songwriter and former Pop Idol runner-up, Gareth Gates. The album is essentially divided into two sections, with tracks one to ten representing "Night", and tracks eleven to nineteen representing "Day". Its domestic and European release consists of the two sections split across two discs, while in other regions, the album is abridged and contained on a single disc. The album is Gates' last release on the Sony BMG record label, as sales of Go Your Own Way were much lower than his first studio album, What My Heart Wants to Say, resulting in his record deal being terminated. Three singles were released from the album: "Spirit in the Sky", "Sunshine" and "Say It Isn't So".

== Track listing ==
Go Your Own Way — Standard edition
No.	Title	Writer(s)	Producer(s)	Length
1.	"Say It Isn't So"	Jorgen Elofsson • Per Magnusson • David Kreuger	Per Magnusson • David Kreuger	4:02
2.	"Skeletons"	Elofsson • Magnusson • Kreuger	Magnusson • Kreuger	2:59
3.	"Listen to My Heart"	Elofsson • John Reid	Quiz & Larossi	3:53
4.	"Too Soon to Say Goodbye"	Andreas Romdhane • Josef Larossi • Savan Kotecha	Quiz & Larossi	3:32
5.	"Lies"	Elofsson • Magnusson • Kreuger	Magnusson • Kreuger	3:22
6.	"Nothing's Gonna Stop Us Now"	Romdhane • Larossi • Kreuger	Quiz & Larossi	3:49
7.	"It Happens Every Time"	Elofsson • Magnusson • Kreuger	Magnusson • Kreuger	3:04
8.	"All Cried Out"	Gareth Gates • Mike Peden • Lindy Robbins • James Harris III • Terry Lewis	Mike Peden	3:41
9.	"Sunshine"	David Mar-Molinero • Simon Keith	Mike Peden	3:36
10.	"Spirit in the Sky" (featuring The Kumars)	Norman Greenbaum	Steve Mac	3:26
11.	"Groove with Me"	Gates • Peden • Damon Sharpe	Mike Peden	3:46
12.	"Absolutely"	Bill Padley • Jem Godfrey • Tyler James	Bill Padley • Jem Godfrey	3:26
13.	"Club Hoppin'"	Gates • Peden • Sharpe • Charlie Russell	Mike Peden	3:32
14.	"Soul Affection"	Rob Davis • Ryan Shaw	Rob Davis	4:08

Go Your Own Way — European edition (tracks 1–9 on disc one, tracks 10–17 on disc two)
No.	Title	Writer(s)	Producer(s)	Length
1.	"Sunshine"	Mar-Molinero • Keith	Mike Peden	3:36
2.	"Groove with Me"	Gates • Peden • Sharpe	Mike Peden	3:46
3.	"Absolutely"	Padley • Godfrey • James	Bill Padley • Jem Godfrey	3:26
4.	"All Cried Out"	Gates • Peden • Robbins • Harris III • Lewis	Mike Peden	3:41
5.	"Enough of Me"	Gates • Peden • Sharpe • Graham Kearns	Mike Peden	4:12
6.	"Go Your Own Way"	Gates • David Eriksen • Wayne Hector • Ali Tennant	David Eriksen	3:21
7.	"Just Say Yes"	Gates • Peden • Sharpe • Robbins • Peter Gordeno • Adam Cantrell	Mike Peden	3:12
8.	"Club Hoppin'"	Gates • Peden • Sharpe • Russell	Mike Peden	3:32
9.	"Soul Affection"	Davis • Shaw	Rob Davis	4:08
10.	"Spirit in the Sky" (featuring The Kumars)	Norman Greenbaum	Steve Mac	3:26
11.	"Say It Isn't So"	Elofsson • Magnusson • Kreuger	Per Magnusson • David Kreuger	4:02
12.	"Skeletons"	Elofsson • Magnusson • Kreuger	Magnusson • Kreuger	2:59
13.	"Listen to My Heart"	Elofsson • Reid	Quiz & Larossi	3:53
14.	"Too Soon to Say Goodbye"	Romdhane • Larossi • Kotecha	Quiz & Larossi	3:32
15.	"Lies"	Elofsson • Magnusson • Kreuger	Magnusson • Kreuger	3:22
16.	"Nothing's Gonna Stop Us Now"	Romdhane • Larossi • Kreuger	Quiz & Larossi	3:49
17.	"It Happens Every Time"	Elofsson • Magnusson • Kreuger	Magnusson • Kreuger	3:04

Go Your Own Way — British edition (tracks 1–10 on disc one, tracks 11–19 on disc two)
No.	Title	Writer(s)	Producer(s)	Length
1.	"Sunshine"	Mar-Molinero • Keith	Mike Peden	3:36
2.	"Groove with Me"	Gates • Peden • Sharpe	Mike Peden	3:46
3.	"Absolutely"	Padley • Godfrey • James	Bill Padley • Jem Godfrey	3:26
4.	"All Cried Out"	Gates • Peden • Robbins • Harris III • Lewis	Mike Peden	3:41
5.	"Enough of Me"	Gates • Peden • Sharpe • Kearns	Mike Peden	4:12
6.	"Go Your Own Way"	Gates • Eriksen • Hector • Tennant	David Eriksen	3:21
7.	"Just Say Yes"	Gates • Peden • Sharpe • Robbins • Gordeno • Cantrell	Mike Peden	3:12
8.	"Freak My Baby"	Gates • Chris Braide	Chris Braide	3:03
9.	"Club Hoppin'"	Gates • Peden • Sharpe • Russell	Mike Peden	3:32
10.	"Soul Affection"	Davis • Shaw	Rob Davis	4:08
11.	"Spirit in the Sky" (featuring The Kumars)	Norman Greenbaum	Steve Mac	3:26
12.	"Say It Isn't So"	Elofsson • Magnusson • Kreuger	Per Magnusson • David Kreuger	4:02
13.	"Skeletons"	Elofsson • Magnusson • Kreuger	Magnusson • Kreuger	2:59
14.	"Listen to My Heart"	Elofsson • Reid	Quiz & Larossi	3:53
15.	"Foolish"	James • Blair MacKichan	Steve Mac	3:23
16.	"Too Soon to Say Goodbye"	Romdhane • Larossi • Kotecha	Quiz & Larossi	3:32
17.	"Lies"	Elofsson • Magnusson • Kreuger	Magnusson • Kreuger	3:22
18.	"Nothing's Gonna Stop Us Now"	Romdhane • Larossi • Kreuger	Quiz & Larossi	3:49
19.	"It Happens Every Time"	Elofsson • Magnusson • Kreuger	Magnusson • Kreuger	3:04

Go Your Own Way — Spanish edition bonus track
No.	Title	Writer(s)	Producer(s)	Length
18.	"What My Heart Wants to Say" (duet with Chenoa)	Elofsson • Magnusson • Kreuger	Magnusson • Kreuger	4:09

Go Your Own Way — Asian special edition bonus disc
No.	Title	Writer(s)	Producer(s)	Length
1.	"Anyone of Us (Stupid Mistake)" (acoustic version)	Elofsson • Magnusson • Kreuger	Magnusson • Kreuger	3:47
2.	"Spirit in the Sky" (acoustic version)	Greenbaum	Steve Mac	3:26
3.	"Enough of Me" (acoustic version)	Gates • Peden • Sharpe • Kearns	Mike Peden	4:12
4.	"Go Your Own Way" (acoustic version)	Gates • Eriksen • Hector • Tennant	David Eriksen	3:21
5.	"Dance Again"	Cathy Dennis • Steve Mac	Steve Mac	3:48
6.	"Will You Wait for Me?"	Paul Wilson • Andy Watkins • Anthony Kavanagh	Absolute	3:50

Go Your Own Way — Taiwanese edition bonus AVCD
No.	Title	Length
1.	"Say it Isn't So" (music video)
2.	"Anyone of Us (Stupid Mistake)" (music video)
3.	"What My Heart Wants to Say" (music video)
4.	"Spirit in the Sky" (music video)
5.	"Asian Showcase Footage"

Go Your Own Way — B-sides
No.	Title	Writer(s)	Producer(s)	Length
1.	"Get to Know Me Better"	Gary White • Henry Johnson • Ed Johnson	Ed Johnson	3:07
2.	"She Doesn't Even Know"	Shaw • Rob Fusari	Ryan Shaw	4:08
3.	"Dance With Me"	Eriksen • Hector	David Eriksen	3:41
4.	"Grease"	Barry Gibb	Steve Mac	3:48

== Charts and certifications ==
=== Charts ===
Chart (2003)	Peak position
Australian Albums (ARIA)	85
Austrian Albums (Ö3 Austria)	59
Dutch Albums (Album Top 100)	40
European Albums Chart	27
German Albums (Offizielle Top 100)	24
Norwegian Albums (VG-lista)	34
Scottish Albums (OCC)	12
Spanish Albums (Promusicae)	56
Swiss Albums (Schweizer Hitparade)	40
UK Albums (OCC)	11

=== Certifications ===
Region	Certification	Certified units/sales
United Kingdom (BPI)	Gold	100,000^{*}
^{*} Sales figures based on certification alone.
