= Rhys (singer) =

American singer-songwriter (born 1997)

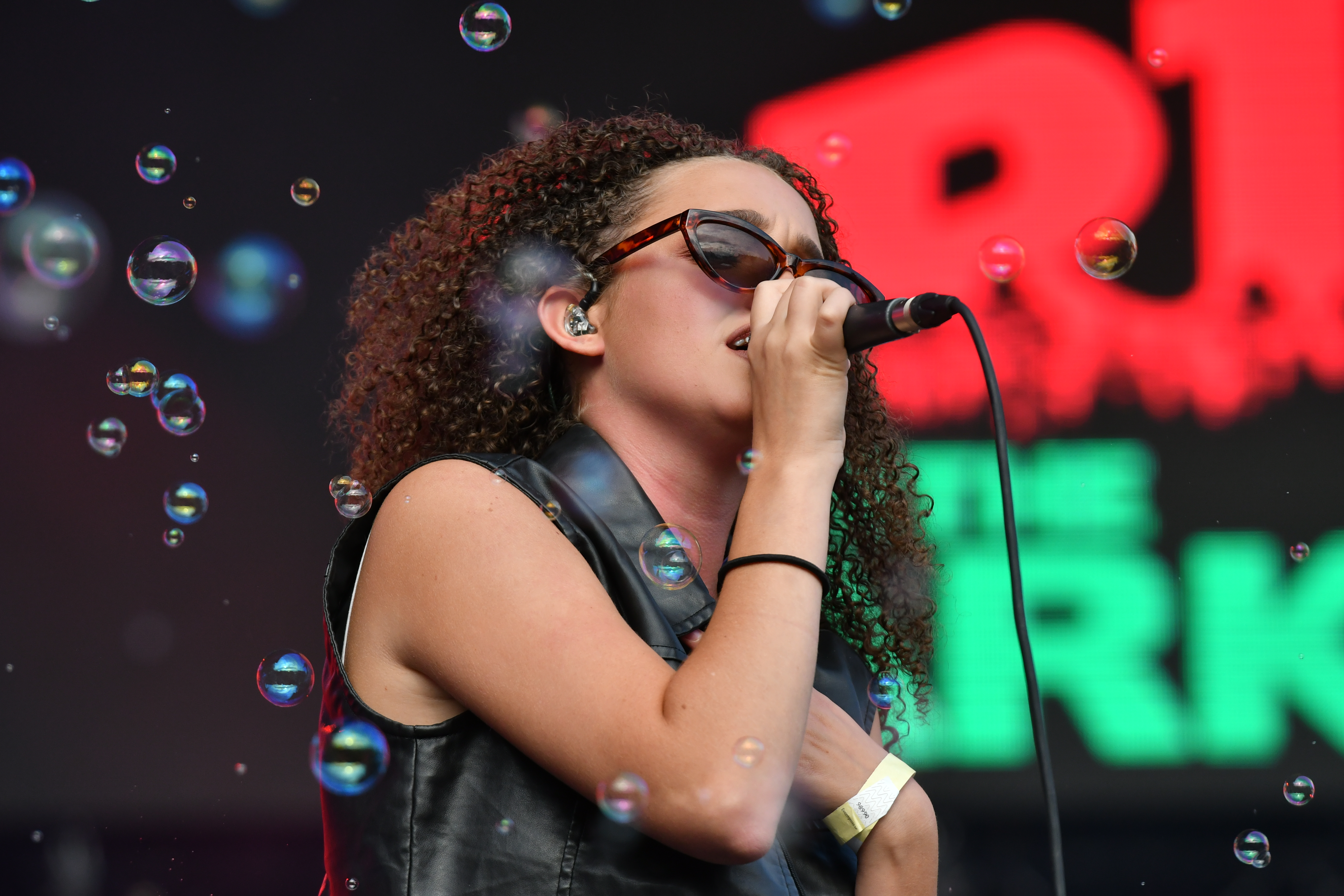
- Rhys in 2018

Background information
- Born: Rhys Clarstedt-Frank; 27 October 1997 (age 28); Portland, Oregon, US
- Origin: Stockholm, Sweden
- Genres: Pop; electronica
- Occupations: Singer; songwriter
- Years active: 2016–present
- Label: Warner Music Sweden

Rhys Clarstedt-Frank (born 27 October 1997), better known as simply Rhys, is a Swedish-American singer and songwriter. Her singles "Swallow Your Pride" and "Last Dance" became hits in Sweden. In 2018 she released her debut album Stages.

== Early life ==
Rhys moved to Stockholm, Sweden from Portland, Oregon at the age of ten with her parents and sister. During this time she showed interest in arts, theater, dance and music, and she participated in several talent shows. She studied music at Kulturama, and theater at Viktor Rydberg Gymnasium.

== Career ==
At the age of eighteen she got to meet music producer Jörgen Elofsson to record a demo. Elofsson really liked her voice, and he started to work with her and help her with her music.

Her first music single "Swallow Your Pride" was released on 25 November 2016 and was written by Rhys herself and Elofsson. The song was named Song of the Week by Sveriges Radio. Rhys performed in Musikhjälpen on 14 December 2016.

On 17 February 2017, she released her next music single called "Last Dance" written by Elofsson. During the summer of 2017 Rhys has performed at Swedish television shows like Sommarkrysset and Lotta på Liseberg. During the same summer she performed in several music festivals such as Way Out West, Storsjöyran and We Are Sthlm.

On 30 August 2017, the US fashion magazine Vogue published an article about Rhys, while she appeared at Stockholm Fashion Week.

== Discography ==
=== Singles ===
Year	Title	Peak positions	Album
Year	Title	SWE	Album
2016	"Swallow Your Pride"	—	Stages
2017	"Last Dance"	51	Stages
2017	"Too Good to Be True"	43	Stages
2017	"The World Is A Beautiful Place"	—	Non-album single
2018	"Maybe I Will Learn"	—	Stages
2018	"No Vacancy"	— (Note: "No Vacancy" did not enter the Swedish Singellista chart, but peaked at number 12 on the Swedish Heatseeker chart.)	Stages
2018	"Starfish" (featuring Felix Sandman)	— (Note: "Starfish" did not enter the Swedish Singellista chart, but peaked at number 17 on the Swedish Heatseeker chart.)	Stages
2020	"Better Break My Heart"	—	
2020	"We Don't Talk Anyway"	87	
2021	"Over You"	—	
2021	"Single At 40"	—	
