= Sunshine (Gareth Gates song) =

2003 single by Gareth Gates

Single by Gareth Gates

from the album Go Your Own Way
- Released: 8 September 2003
- Length: 3:36
- Label: BMG; 19; S
- Songwriters: Dan Mar-Molinero; Steven Keith
- Producer: Mike Peden

Gareth Gates singles chronology
"Spirit in the Sky" (2003)	"Sunshine" (2003)	"Say It Isn't So" (2003)

"Sunshine" is the second single released from Pop Idol runner-up Gareth Gates' second studio album, Go Your Own Way (2003). The single was released on 8 September 2003 and peaked at number three on the UK Singles Chart. This was the second single from Gates that failed to reach the top spot. The promotional video was infamously available to vote to enter the MTV2 viewers chart despite the channel being entirely an alternative rock format. It gained under 10 votes and was included to vote on as a joke.

== Track listings ==
UK CD1

1. "Sunshine"
2. "Soul Affection"
3. "Sunshine" (Bimbo Jones cub mix)
4. "Sunshine" (video)

UK CD2

1. "Sunshine"
2. "Get to Know Me Better"
3. "Sunshine" (Groovefinder club mix)
4. Making of the video

European CD single

1. "Sunshine" – 3:36
2. "Get to Know Me Better" – 3:05

Australian CD single

1. "Sunshine"
2. "Get to Know Me Better"
3. "Sunshine" (Groovefinder club mix)

== Charts ==
=== Weekly charts ===
Chart (2003–2004)	Peak position
Australia (ARIA)	60
Belgium (Ultratip Bubbling Under Flanders)	6
Belgium (Ultratip Bubbling Under Wallonia)	5
Europe (Eurochart Hot 100)	10
Germany (GfK)	71
Hungary (Rádiós Top 40)	37
Ireland (IRMA)	20
Netherlands (Dutch Top 40 Tipparade)	12
Netherlands (Single Top 100)	77
Scotland Singles (OCC)	4
UK Singles (OCC)	3

=== Year-end charts ===
Chart (2003)	Position
UK Singles (OCC)	101

== Release history ==
Region	Date	Format(s)	Label(s)	Ref.
United Kingdom	8 September 2003	CD	BMG; 19; S	
Australia	27 October 2003	CD	BMG; 19; S	
