= Changes (Gareth Gates song) =

Single by Gareth Gates

from the album Pictures of the Other Side
- Released: April 9, 2007
- Recorded: 2006
- Genre: Soul; pop
- Label: UMTV
- Songwriter(s): Gareth Gates, John Hall, Sacha Skarbek, Matin Terefe, Nick Whitecross
- Producer(s): Martin Terefe, Kissing the Pink

Gareth Gates singles chronology
"Say It Isn't So" (2003)	"Changes" (2007)	"Angel on My Shoulder" (2007)

"Changes" is the first single taken from Gareth Gates' third studio album, Pictures of the Other Side. It was released on 9 April 2007 and was his first commercial single since "Say It Isn't So" in 2003. The single charted at No. 14 on the UK Singles Chart but the following week dropped out of the top 40, breaking his streak of top ten hits.

The music video for "Changes" is directed by Andy Hylton.

== Track listing ==
CD

1. "Changes"
2. "Lovesong"

Download

1. "Changes" (Edit)
2. "Changes"
3. "Lovesong"
4. "Changes" (Acoustic)

== Music Reviews ==
In the chart commentary in Yahoo Music UK & Ireland by James Masterton, he rated that "Changes" is a fascinating single certainly.
