= Pictures of the Other Side =

Studio album by Gareth Gates
- Released: 25 June 2007
- Recorded: 2006
- Genre: Pop, soul
- Length: 43:04
- Label: Universal
- Producer: Martin Terefe, Kissing the Pink

Gareth Gates chronology
Go Your Own Way (2003)	Pictures of the Other Side (2007)

Singles from Pictures of the Other Side
- 1. "Changes" Released: 9 April 2007; 2. "Angel on My Shoulder" Released: 18 June 2007

Professional ratings
Review scores
Source	Rating
Daily Express	3/5 stars
Rainbow Network	3/5 stars
UKMix	4/5 stars

Pictures of the Other Side is the third studio album to have been released by English singer-songwriter and former Pop Idol runner-up, Gareth Gates. The album was released nearly four years after his second album, Go Your Own Way, due to a change in record label, from Sony BMG to Universal. The album was produced entirely by Martin Terefe and production duo Kissing the Pink. Just two singles were released from the album: "Changes" and "Angel on My Shoulder". The album peaked at number 23 on the UK Albums Chart. Gates has since announced that he has no plans to release a fourth album in the future.

== Track listing ==
Standard edition
No.	Title	Writer(s)	Producer(s)	Length
1.	"Changes"	Gareth Gates, John Hall, Sacha Skarbek, Martin Terefe, Nicholas Whitecross	Martin Terefe	4:14
2.	"Pictures of the Other Side"	Gareth Gates, Darren Berry	Kissing the Pink	4:01
3.	"Lost in You"	Gareth Gates, Gary Clark, Peter Gordeno	Kissing the Pink	3:56
4.	"19 Minutes"	Martin Terefe, Sacha Skarbek	Martin Terefe	4:15
5.	"New Kid in Town"	Hans Aaserud, Geir Leudy, Tom Nichols	Kissing the Pink	4:11
6.	"Can't Believe It's Over"	Gareth Gates, John Hall, Martin Terefe, Nicholas Whitecross	Martin Terefe	4:31
7.	"Afterglow"	Gareth Gates, John Hall, Martin Terefe, Nicholas Whitecross	Martin Terefe	3:56
8.	"Angel on My Shoulder"	Gareth Gates, Pete Martin, Tom Nichols	Kissing the Pink	4:19
9.	"Electric"	Gareth Gates, Ricky Ross	Kissing the Pink	4:06
10.	"Talking Minds"	Gareth Gates	Kissing the Pink	3:20

iTunes Store deluxe edition bonus tracks
No.	Title	Writer(s)	Producer(s)	Length
11.	"Love Song"	Gareth Gates, Martin Terefe	Martin Terefe	2:51
12.	"Horizon Shining"	Gareth Gates, Andy Todd	Kissing the Pink	4:26
13.	"Drive"	Martin Terefe, Sacha Scarbek	Martin Terefe	3:00
14.	"Changes" (Video)			4:14
15.	"Angel on My Shoulder" (Video)			4:19

== Charts ==
Chart (2007)	Peak position
Scottish Albums Chart	37
UK Albums Chart	23
