= What My Heart Wants to Say (song) =

2002 single by Gareth Gates

Single by Gareth Gates

from the album What My Heart Wants to Say
- B-side: "Christmas to Remember"; "Good Thing"; "Yesterday"
- Released: 9 December 2002
- Recorded: 2002
- Length: 4:06
- Label: RCA; 19; S; BMG
- Songwriters: Steve Mac; Jörgen Elofsson
- Producer: Steve Mac

Gareth Gates singles chronology
"The Long and Winding Road" / "Suspicious Minds" (2002)	"What My Heart Wants to Say" (2002)	"Spirit in the Sky" (2003)

"What My Heart Wants to Say" is the fourth single from English pop singer Gareth Gates' debut studio album of the same name. The song was written by Steve Mac and Jorgen Elofsson and produced by Mac. Upon its release on 9 December 2002, the single peaked at number five on the UK Singles Chart; it was Gates' first single not to top the UK chart.

== Track listings ==
UK CD1

1. "What My Heart Wants to Say" (single remix)
2. "Christmas to Remember"
3. "Good Thing"
4. "What My Heart Wants to Say" (video)

UK CD2

1. "What My Heart Wants to Say" (single remix)
2. "Anyone of Us (Stupid Mistake)" (live)
3. "Yesterday"
4. "What My Heart Wants to Say" (exclusive behind the scenes footage)

European CD single

1. "What My Heart Wants to Say" (single remix) – 4:12
2. "Good Thing" – 3:48

== Credits and personnel ==
Credits are lifted from the What My Heart Wants to Say album booklet.

Studios

- Produced, arranged, mixed, and engineered at Rokstone Studios (London, England)
- Strings recorded at Abbey Road Studios (London, England)
- Mastered at Transfermation (London, England)

Personnel

- Steve Mac – writing, keyboards, production, arrangement, mixing
- Jorgen Elofsson – writing
- Mae McKenna – additional backing vocals
- Chris Laws – drums, engineering
- Daniel Pursey – percussion, assistant engineering
- Richard Dowling – mastering

== Charts ==
=== Weekly charts ===
Chart (2002)	Peak position
Europe (Eurochart Hot 100)	19
Ireland (IRMA)	20
Norway (VG-lista)	16
Scotland Singles (OCC)	6
Switzerland (Schweizer Hitparade)	52
UK Singles (OCC)	5

=== Year-end charts ===
Chart (2002)	Position
UK Singles (OCC)	146
