= Angel on My Shoulder (Gareth Gates song) =

Single by Gareth Gates

from the album Pictures of the Other Side
- Released: June 18, 2007
- Recorded: 2006
- Genre: Pop
- Label: Universal
- Songwriters: Gareth Gates, Pete Martin, Tom Nichols
- Producer: Martin Terefe

Gareth Gates singles chronology
"Changes" (2007)	"Angel on My Shoulder" (2007)

"Angel on My Shoulder" is the second and final single taken released from Pop Idol runner-up Gareth Gates' third studio album, Pictures of the Other Side. Gates describes the song as a song that "everyone can relate to in some way". He also points out that "lyrically, it talks about a figure in one's life who is there when things go wrong. It could be a partner, a friend or a relative". The single peaked at #22 on the UK Singles Chart but dropped out of the Top 40 the week after. Due to low sales of the album, and poor sales for his upcoming UK Tour, a third release from the album was cancelled and Gates was dropped from his record label.

== Track listing ==
1. "Angel On My Shoulder" – 4:16
2. "Horizon Shining" – 3:11
