= Gareth Gates =

British singer-songwriter

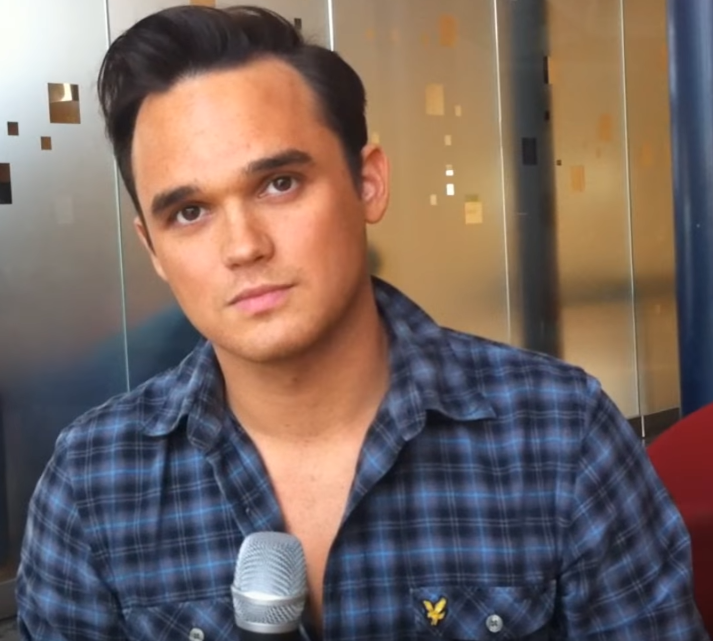
- Gates in 2011
- Born: Gareth Paul Gates; 12 July 1984 (age 42); West Bowling, West Yorkshire, England
- Years active: 2002–present
- Children: 1
- Musical career
- Genre: Pop
- Occupations: Singer-songwriter; actor
- Instruments: Vocals; keyboards
- Labels: RCA; BMG; S; 19; UMTV
- Website: garethgates.com

Gareth Paul Gates (born 12 July 1984) is an English singer-songwriter and actor. He was the runner-up in the first series of the ITV talent show Pop Idol in 2002. As of 2008, Gates had sold over 3.5 million records in the UK. He is also known for having a stutter, and has talked about his speech impediment publicly.

In 2009, Gates moved into musical theatre, playing the title role in the West End production of Joseph and the Amazing Technicolor Dreamcoat at the Adelphi Theatre. From 2009 to 2011, Gates completed an 18-month stint as Marius in Les Misérables, initially in the touring production, and then in the West End production of the show. He also took the roles of Eddie in the musical Loserville, Warner in Legally Blonde in 2012 and Dean in Boogie Nights the Musical in Concert in 2013. He was part of the pop group 5th Story, set up for The Big Reunion.

== Early life ==
Gates was born in West Bowling, Bradford to an Anglo-Indian father and white British mother—Paul Gates and Wendy Gates (née Broadbent Farry). He has three sisters, and grew up with a cousin who was fostered by his parents, who regularly fostered other children. Gates and his sisters attended Dixons City Technology College in West Bowling, Bradford, where Gates studied art and music at GCSE level.

He joined Bradford Cathedral choir at the age of nine. He was head chorister by the age of eleven, singing solo for Queen Elizabeth II when she visited in 1997. Gates achieved Grade 8 in piano, classical guitar and singing. He became a Christian through Bradford's Abundant Life church, where he played his guitar. Gates gained a reserve place at the Royal Northern College of Music in Manchester before the finals of Pop Idol.

== Career ==
=== 2002–2003: Pop Idol, What My Heart Wants to Say and Go Your Own Way ===
Gates was the runner-up to Will Young on the first series of Pop Idol in February 2002. Gates auditioned with Flying Without Wings and was put through to the next round of the show. Despite not winning the competition, he was soon signed up by Simon Cowell to the BMG label.

Gates' first single, a cover of "Unchained Melody", entered the UK Singles Chart at number one. The single went double-platinum in the UK, and was voted 2002's The Record of the Year by ITV viewers. This was followed by another number-one single, "Anyone of Us (Stupid Mistake)". His third single, a double A-side "Suspicious Minds"/"The Long and Winding Road", a duet with Pop Idol winner Will Young, also reached number one. His fourth, "What My Heart Wants to Say", reached number five. Gates's debut album What My Heart Wants to Say achieved first week sales of 100,000 copies, peaking at number two in the UK Albums Chart, and eventually earned double platinum status in the UK.

Smash Hits magazine dedicated 7 October 2002 as International Gareth Gates Day. In 2003, Gates sang the 2003 Comic Relief charity single, "Spirit in the Sky", with The Kumars. The single was a UK number-one for two weeks. He also appeared in Comic Relief's Celebrity Driving School. Through Comic Relief, he became involved with Body and Soul, a charity that helps people affected by HIV and AIDS.

His next single, "Sunshine", reached number three and was taken from his second album Go Your Own Way, which was released in October 2003. However, the album was far less successful than his debut album. It peaked at number eleven in the UK before dropping to No. 32 the following week, and only spent four weeks on the album chart altogether. The album enjoyed slightly more success in a number of Asian countries however, and Gates won MTV Asia's award for Best International Male in 2003/04. He was awarded the same title by MTV China and MTV Taiwan.

His next single, "Say It Isn't So", reached number four in late 2003, but proved to be Gates' last single release in the UK until April 2007. At the start of 2004 he did an arena tour of the UK, then continued to promote his album throughout Europe and Asia, before taking a break and training as a speech coach and course instructor with the McGuire Programme.

By this point, Gates had sold just over three million music singles in the UK, including the second and sixth best selling singles in 2002 ("Unchained Melody", which sold 1.4 million, and "Anyone of Us (Stupid Mistake)", which sold 581,000) and the second-best-selling single in 2003 ("Spirit in the Sky", 561,000 copies). All three of these singles were listed in the Top 100 singles of the decade (2000–2009) as announced on Radio 1 with Spirit in the Sky at no. 62, Anyone of Us (no. 56), and Unchained Melody (no. 2). The biggest-selling single of the decade was "Anything is Possible"/"Evergreen" by Will Young, whom Gates had lost the Pop Idol contest to. In the 2003 film Seeing Double, alongside pop group S Club, Gates played a clone version of himself. He also promoted AIDS awareness through a charity concert to 50,000 people with MTV in Indonesia.

=== 2004–2009: Pictures of the Other Side and Dancing on Ice ===
In 2003 and 2004, it was reported that Gates was being dropped by his record company BMG. The reports, which also cited low sales of his second album and low concert ticket sales as reasons, were denied by both Gates and the record company at the time. Gates was later dropped from the label in April 2006 before the release of any new material.

In 2006, Gates appeared in a television documentary for ITV1 called Whatever Happened To Gareth Gates?, which dealt with his experiences in the music industry and his life outside it. The documentary was screened in December 2006, and confirmed a new record deal with UMTV (part of Universal) and a new album as well as showcasing snippets of the new material. An early preview of his new album was given at a secret gig on 29 November 2006. Gates had been working with writers such as Sacha Skarbek (who has worked with James Blunt), Ricky Ross (of Deacon Blue), Gary Clark and Pete Gordeno, and new the album was produced by Martin Terefe, Jon Hall and Nick Whitecross.

Since 2004 Gates had also been working with singer-songwriter Judie Tzuke. Initial contact was apparently made through Lucie Silvas. Gates' regular acoustic guitarist, Graham Kearns, also worked with Tzuke and has writing credits with Gates on both albums. Appearing at the Limelight venue in Crewe during Tzuke's October 2004 tour, Gates sang backing vocals to a surprised audience on Tzuke's track "Bully" (from her album Secret Agent). A song Gates co-wrote with Tzuke, "Dark Days", appeared on Tzuke's 2007 album Songs 1.

On 30 March 2007, Gates appeared on Friday Night with Jonathan Ross, the first time he had participated in an interview for a mainstream television chat-show since his speech improvement.

The first single from Gates' third album was "Changes" which was released on 9 April 2007. The single peaked at Number 14. A second single, "Angel on My Shoulder", was released on 18 June 2007, peaking at Number 22. Both singles remained in the UK Top 40 for only one week. Gates' third album, Pictures of the Other Side, was released on 25 June 2007. It proved to be Gates' lowest selling album to date and spent only two weeks on the UK album chart, entering at Number 23 before falling to Number 66 the following week, then dropping out of the chart altogether.

On 6 July 2008, Gates starred in the line-up for A Spoonful of Stiles & Drewe, a charity fundraiser to celebrate 25 years of musical theatre composers George Stiles and Anthony Drewe. Gates played the part of Robbie in a preview of a new musical Soho Cinders and features on the album.

In 2008, Gates appeared on ITV1's Dancing on Ice with skating partner Maria Filippov, finishing fourth, losing a place in the final to Zaraah Abrahams and dancing partner Fred Palascak.

During his time working with Judie Tzuke, Gates also co-wrote the song "Christmas and I'm Home" with her. It was first premiered live by Gates in 2004 in Bradford, and Tzuke recorded the song with pianist Haim Cotton. Tzuke's version was released commercially in November 2008, as a charity single download and as a physical CD single sold exclusively through the CD Baby website.

In 2009, Gates was cast in the lead role in Joseph and the Amazing Technicolor Dreamcoat at the Adelphi Theatre, London. Taking over the role from Lee Mead, Gates began the role on 7 February 2009 and continued to play the part until the final performance on 30 May 2009.

Gates performed at the charity event "Broadway To West End by Special Arrangement" on 4 October 2009 at the Drury Lane Theatre, singing "Why God, Why?" as a solo and "The Last Night of the World" as a duet with Ima Castro. Both songs come from the musical Miss Saigon. The event was to honour the work of orchestrator William David Brohm and raised funds for CLIC Sargent Cancer care.

In June 2009, it was announced that Gates was joining the cast of the International 25th Anniversary World Tour production of Les Misérables in the role of Marius. Gates had been offered the choice of playing Marius in London's West End or in the anniversary tour, but opted for the tour as it was a new production and there was the opportunity to make the part his own. A live cast recording, Les Misérables Live, was recorded in Manchester and released as a double album in September 2010 on the label First Night Records.

In December 2009, Gates took part in ITV's All Star Family Fortunes, along with his then wife Suzanne, mum Wendy, sister Nicola and best friend Matt, and won £30,000 for The Bobby Moore Fund for bowel cancer. Other TV and sporting activities for charity have included an appearance on Sky's Don't Forget the Lyrics! and ITV's Mr. and Mrs. again for the Bobby Moore Fund and various events for the Rhys Daniels Trust.

=== 2010–2012: Les Miserables, documentary, and Loserville ===
Following the final performance of the anniversary tour at The Barbican, London, in October 2010, Gates joined the West End production of Les Misérables at Queen's Theatre where he continued to play the part of Marius until June 2011.

Gates took a break from musical theatre to work on other projects, including writing a new album, but planned to return in March 2012, taking the part of Claude in the UK touring production of Hair It was later announced that the musical would not proceed as efforts to rescue the tour following the bankruptcy of the original production company had failed.

In January 2012, Gates featured in a one night only charity production of Children of Eden playing the part of Cain/Japeth in aid of Crohn's disease.

A documentary, Stop My Stutter, was broadcast on BBC Three in February 2012. In the documentary, Gates worked with five young men and women who've stammered since childhood. Speaking of the documentary, he said "Hopefully this documentary will give people an insight into something that most take for granted – speaking!"

Instead, Gates played Eddie in the new musical Loserville at the West Yorkshire Playhouse in 2012. The musical was written by Busted's James Bourne and Elliot Davis. Along with Gates, the cast also included EastEnders Aaron Sidwell and Lil' Chris.

In July 2012, Gates took over the role of Warner in the UK tour of the musical Legally Blonde.

=== 2013–2017: The Big Reunion, Greatest Hits, and Footloose ===
In early 2013 he toured in the musical Boogie Nights, with members of The Osmonds, Louise Lytton, Shane Richie, Chico & Andy Abraham.

On 27 December 2013, it was announced that Gates, along with Dane Bowers (from Another Level), Kenzie (from Blazin' Squad), Adam Rickitt, and Kavana would be forming a "supergroup" called 5th Story for the ITV2 documentary The Big Reunion. Following the programme, the newly formed group toured in October 2014 as part of the Big Reunion Boyband Tour.

In January 2014, Gates again took part in Dancing on Ice for the final series, partnered this time by Brianne Delcourt. That year's show consisted of former series champions and public favourites. He finished in 7th place, and went on to appear in the very last Dancing on Ice tour in March and April 2014.

A compilation album, The Very Best of Gareth Gates, was released by Sony Music in March 2014. It includes the hit singles from his first two albums and two other tracks from his first album (all of which are owned by Sony Music), plus three brand new acoustic tracks which he recorded with his guitarist Pete Rinaldi. The album failed to chart.

In 2016, Gates starred as Willard in a national tour of Footloose. He took several breaks during the tour, and during his absences his part was played by Lee Brennan.

During spring 2017, Gates appeared in Robin Hood Easter Panto at various locations within the United Kingdom.

=== 2022–present: Festival headlining and Celebrity SAS ===
In June 2022, Gates hosted a Bradford-based Jubilee party, Big 80s Festival, in celebration of the Queen's seventieth year on the throne. Gates said, "I speak to people in Bradford. To see a huge act, they often have to go to a different city. Whether that’s over to Manchester, Leeds or even Birmingham. To bring all these acts to Bradford, we are trying to do something where we are now their go-to events company to see world class acts. Our main aim is make sure the people of Bradford don’t have to travel and they can get all these shows on their doorstep."

On 2 July 2022, Gates headlined Dartford Pride.

Gates won the 2023 edition of British reality TV show Celebrity SAS: Who Dares Wins, beating Member of Parliament Matt Hancock and model Danielle Lloyd in the final.

In 2025, it was announced that Gates was working on a musical, titled Speechless, which was tentatively due to be produced in the West End in 2026. Gates said, "I’ve been writing a musical called Speechless,” Gates told STV. “It’s about a guy that can’t speak – obviously something I can massively identify with. I think we’ve locked in a West End theatre for 2026, so watch this space, I guess".

== Personal life ==
Gates lived in Chiswick, west London, with wife Suzanne Gates (née Mole) until their split in 2012. The couple met when she was a dancer at the Record of the Year awards in 2002, which Gates won for "Unchained Melody". In October 2006, The People newspaper incorrectly reported that they had secretly married. However, Gates and Mole got engaged on New Year's Eve 2007 and were married on 18 July 2008 in a private ceremony for family and friends. The couple had a daughter on 6 April 2009.

Gates met Faye Brookes in 2012 when they starred together in Legally Blonde: The Musical, shortly before he split from his wife. Gates and Brookes ended their relationship in 2019. As of 2023, Gates is in a relationship with stage actress Allana Taylor.

In 2002, glamour model Katie Price sold her story to the UK tabloid media, stating she had taken Gates' virginity; at the time, Gates was 17, and Price was heavily pregnant with her first child with a previous partner. At first, Gates denied the relationship, but later conceded it was true. In 2024, he stated, "[Katie has] made a career out of talking about relationships. Once you accept that, it is what it is [...] I thought the press had made it up. But then it turned out it actually was her who sold the story – that was a lot for a kid who wasn’t even an adult yet to take. I would never talk about intimate details that two people have had together. Out of respect for them, and out of respect for myself. That’s just not something I do".

In 2009, it was reported that Gates had made an estimated £6.5 million during his career to date. The Irish Independent newspaper reported that Gates was one of a number of celebrities with investments in the company Ingenious Media, which backed a number of films, including Avatar and X-Men Origins: Wolverine.

=== Charitable causes ===
On 7 September 2008, Gates played for England against The Rest of the World in Soccer Aid 2008 at Wembley in aid of UNICEF.

Gates qualified as a speech coach and latterly as a course instructor with the McGuire Programme where he helps those with stammers similar to his own. He co-led his first full course in February 2005 and in August 2006 he instructed his first course single-handedly in Galway, Ireland. He led his second at Bournemouth in November 2006. Gates spoke to MPs including David Amess, Robert Buckland, and Steve Brine at the Palace of Westminster as part of a briefing on communication disability hosted by the Royal College of Speech and Language Therapists and the Centre for Social Justice. Gates said, "By speaking today I hope to shed light on the issues that surround speech and language difficulties. In particular, through my own experiences, I want to explain how the inability to converse and communicate drastically shapes and moulds people's lives. It determines the sort of people they become and the paths they follow." On 18 October 2011, his work as an ambassador, raising awareness of the issues surrounding speech difficulties, was recognised at the Giving Voice Awards Ceremony.

In 2012, Gates, alongside Jonathan Wilkes, then-wife Suzanne and Wilkes' wife Nikki, set up the Gates and Wilkes Academy of Performing Arts for people from the ages 5–18, in his home town of Bradford. Gates and Wilkes opened a second academy in Milton Keynes. During an interview with BBC Radio Leeds on 16 June 2012, Gates announced plans to open a further academy in Leeds. After the separation from his wife, the partnership was broken up, though Gates now has three performing arts academies of his own in Yorkshire.

Gates is a patron of the HIV/AIDS charity Body and Soul and of The Bobby Moore Fund, which supports research into bowel cancer. He took part in the 2009 Cosmo Everyman campaign to raise awareness of prostate and testicular cancer.

In 2020, Gates presented the BBC Lifeline Appeal for the British Stammering Association.

== Discography ==
=== Studio albums ===
- What My Heart Wants to Say (2002)
- Go Your Own Way (2003)
- Pictures of the Other Side (2007)

=== Compilation albums ===
- The Very Best of Gareth Gates (2014)

== Theatre ==
- Joseph and the Amazing Technicolour Dreamcoat. Joseph. West End 2009
- Les Misérables international tour. Marius 2009/10
- Les Misérables. Marius. West End 2010/11
- Loserville. Eddie Arch. West Yorkshire Playhouse, Leeds 18 June – 14 July 2012
- Legally Blonde UK Tour. 'Warner' At various venues from 17 July 2012 to September 2012
- Sleeping Beauty. The Prince. Marlowe Theatre 30 November 2012 to 20 January 2013
- Boogie Nights. Dean. UK tour January to April 2013
- Footloose. Willard. UK tour January to October 2016
- Jack and the Beanstalk. Jack. Hull New Theatre December 2022
- SpongeBob: The Musical. Squidward. UK Tour 2023.

== Tours ==
Pop tours

- Pop Idol Arena Tour (2002)
- Will Young and Gareth Gates Arena Tour (2002)
- Go Your Own Way Arena Tour – UK and Asia (2004)
- Boyband in the Buff (2026)

== Awards ==
UK

- The Record of the Year 2002: "Unchained Melody"
- Smash Hits Awards 2002: best male, best hair, best newcomer, most fanciable male
- Smash Hits Awards 2002 Nominees: Best Live Act, Best Singles for "Anyone of Us" and "Unchained Melody"
- Smash Hits Awards 2003: best male, best single ("Sunshine")
- Young Achievers Yorkshire 2002
- Special award for service to Yorkshire 2002
- Giving Voice Celebrity Ambassador award. October 2011
- Top of the Pops Awards 2002 Nominees: Best Pop Act, Best Newcomer
- Top of the Pops Awards 2003 Nominees: Singer of the Year, Best Official Site, Best Fan Site, Song of the Year, Video of the Year for "Sunshine"

Overseas

- MTV Asia: Best International Male 2003/2004
- MTV China: Best International Male 2003/2004
- MTV Taiwan: Best International Male 2003/2004
- TMF Belgium: Best International Pop
- MTV Taiwan: Inspiration to Youth
- G-Music (Taiwan): Best International Artist 2003
- Hit FM: Best single of 2003 (AOU)
