= Jörgen Elofsson =

Swedish songwriter (born 1962)

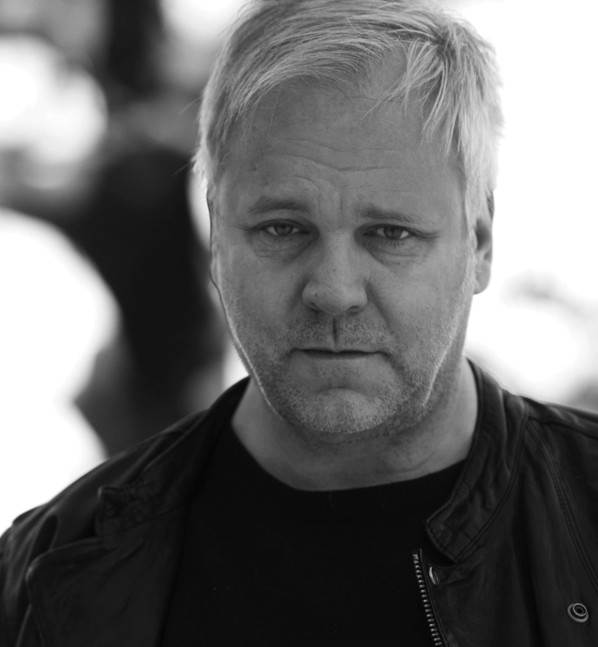
- Born: Kjell Åke Jörgen Elofsson; 14 January 1962 (age 64); Ängelholm, Sweden
- Occupations: songwriter; record producer; singer; painter
- Years active: 1978–present
- Musical career
- Genres: Pop; soul; rock
- Instruments: Vocals; Guitar
- Website: Official website

Kjell Åke Jörgen Elofsson (born 14 January 1962) is a Swedish songwriter.

He was one of the writers of the songwriter-team at Cheiron Studios in Stockholm (along with Denniz PoP, Max Martin, Kristian Lundin, Andreas Carlsson, Rami Yacoub, Per Magnusson, David Kreuger, Herbie Crichlow, Jake Schulze, Alexander Kronlund and Alexandra Talomaa) where he made successful songs such as Britney Spears' "Sometimes" and "(You Drive Me) Crazy".

He is also known for co-writing hit songs like Kelly Clarkson's "Stronger (What Doesn't Kill You)", which was nominated for Song the Year and Record of the Year at the 2013 Grammy Awards, as well as Westlife's "Fool Again", "Unbreakable", and "Evergreen".

== Early years (1978–1998) ==
Elofsson grew up in a small community called Skälderviken, outside Ängelholm in the south of Sweden. His father was not very present in his life and was a workaholic and alcoholic. His mother was a homemaker. Elofsson has explained he inherited the tendency to worry from his mother, and his tenacity from his father.

His musical career started when he was 16, and he was the lead singer and guitarist in several local groups between 1978 and 1986, namely Air, Egon Pretty Band, Art Light, Garbo and Sitting Ducks.

Only a few months later Jörgen signed his first record deal, with CBS. A solo career under the artist name "Shane" was launched and the first single, "Dance With Another", lifted from his 1989 debut album "Man in Me" was released. In 1993 the artist known as Shane came to an end.

Elofsson explained, "I decided that I wanted to concentrate solely on writing music and not being an artist."

Elofsson became a full-time songwriter in 1994, when he worked with the Swedish artist Carola.

== Cheiron Studios (1998–2001) ==
His work at Cheiron Studios began in January 1998, and he was mainly working together with David Kreuger and Per Magnusson.

Shortly after joining Cheiron, the studio was contacted by the Irish group "Boyzone" who needed material for their upcoming third album. Jörgen then co-wrote the song "Will Be Yours". Boyzone's album "Where We Belong" was released on May 25, 1998, and went straight to #1 in the UK. This was Boyzone's third consecutive album number one and it marked Jörgen's first international success.

On January 12, 1999, Britney Spears’ debut album "…Baby One More Time" came out. Jörgen's "Sometimes" was released on April 30 as Spears’ second single. It was produced by Per Magnusson and David Kreuger with additional co-production by Jörgen. Though it was not released as a physical single in the US, it became a worldwide success and peaked inside the top ten in eleven countries. In the UK it reached #3 and is to date Spears’ third best-selling single in the country.

Together with all the songwriters at Cheiron working on the album, "…Baby One More Time", Jörgen received his first Diamond Award for selling more than 10 million copies in the US that year alone. To date it has sold more than 30 million copies worldwide. In January 2000, Cheiron Productions’ songwriters and producers were awarded the Music Export Prize by the Swedish Government.

== Works with Westlife, the following years after Cheiron (2001–2008) ==
Simon Cowell, an A&R executive at BMG Music Publishing at the time, wished material for a new Irish band called "Westside", which he recently had signed. It was discovered though that the name already had been taken and was rapidly changed to "Westlife".

Three of the songs which appeared on the band's self-titled debut album, released on November 1, 1999, were co-written by Jörgen. Two of them, "If I Let You Go" and "Fool Again" became UK #1's.

On October 6, 2001, the new groundbreaking talent show, "Pop Idol", created by the artist manager and television producer, Simon Fuller premiered on British ITV. Running for nine weeks, it became a huge success. The winning song, "Evergreen", was written exclusively for the contest by Jörgen, Per Magnusson and David Kreuger. Because the broadcast of the music competition had been delayed by several months, Simon Cowell, one of the judges and A&R at BMG, decided to first release the song on Westlife's album, "World of Our Own". The first Pop Idol, Will Young, was crowned winner on February 10, 2002. Two weeks later, on February 25, "Evergreen" was released.

While writing songs for new artists, Jörgen now also got the opportunity to work with Céline Dion, one of the world's most successful artists. Her ninth English album, "A New Day Has Come", included the song, "The Greatest Reward", co-written by Jörgen and Andreas Carlsson, and was released on March 26, 2002. It became Dion's first #1 debut in the US, peaking at the top spot in over 20 countries and eventually selling more than 12 million copies around the world. Following the success of Pop Idol in the UK, American Idol debuted in the US on June 11 that same year. Twenty-five episodes were aired over 11 weeks and on September 4 Kelly Clarkson was crowned winner. Two weeks later her winning song, "A Moment Like This", was released. Written by Jörgen together with John Reid, it became Jörgen's first #1 on the Billboard Hot 100. By the end of 2002, Westlife had released their fourth album, the 19 track compilation, "Unbreakable: The Greatest Hits Vol 1", which included six brand new songs, two of them co-written by Jörgen. Released on November 4 as the album's first single, "Unbreakable" set a record by moving from #196 to #1 in only one week, the greatest leap in UK chart history. The album came out a week later and also went to #1 and despite its late year release it became the 9th bestselling album of 2002 in the UK. The album re-entered the charts in 2007 and was re-issued in 2008 spending a total of 55 weeks on the UK Top 100 Albums chart. To date Westlife has sold more than 50 million records worldwide. March 2003 Jamai Loman won the Dutch equivalent of Pop Idol, Idols (Dutch TV series). Henkjan Smits, one of the judges and A&R-executive at BMG The Netherlands, chose the song Step Right Up, written bij Jörgen with Andreas Carlsson, as the winning single. The single went straight to #1, broke records in The Netherlands and was 4 times platinum.

In 2005 Jörgen created the record label Planet Six, part of former BMG, currently Universal Music Publishing Group.

On November 7, 2005, the operaband Il Divo released their sophomore album "Ancora". Just like their first release, it went to #1 in the UK as well as in 12 other countries. In the US it came out on January 24 and debuted at #1 on the Billboard 200 a week later. Included on the album was, "I Believe in You (Je Crois En Toi)", a duet with Céline Dion, co-written by Jörgen. The song was released as singles both by Il Divo, to this day their one and only single, as well as Céline Dion, lifted from her album "On Ne Changes Pas. " To date Jörgen has written or co-written six songs for Il Divo, including "Senza Parole" on the quartet's latest album "Wicked Game" released in November 2011.

Given the honorable assignment of writing the official theme song for the 2006 FIFA World Cup football tournament, Jörgen wrote "The Time of Our Lives", also a duet, this time between Il Divo and the American singer Toni Braxton. Together they performed the song at the opening ceremony in Munich, Germany on the evening of June 9.

Jörgen is very well known for his winning songs written for UK Pop Idol and American Idol. His lyrics and music have been performed by Idol-winners all over the world, for example in Austria, Belgium, Finland, Germany, Holland and Sweden. By selling more than 128,000 copies in one week, the single set two national records: for the highest first week sales by a debut artist and an Australian artist. Sebastian stayed at #1 on the Australian Aria Singles List for three weeks. It went on to sell in excess of 303,000 units. Thus far Jörgen has written seventeen Idol winning songs, which makes him the world record holder.

On May 25, 2006, Jörgen, with his, "That’s My Goal" (Shayne Ward) received the prestigious Ivor Novello Award for the Best Selling British Single of 2005. Twelve months later he would have yet another one in his hands. On May 24th, 2007 Jörgen was back on the stage collecting his second consecutive Ivor Novello Award, this time for the Best Selling British Single of 2006.

== The Royal Wedding ==
It all got started with a telephone call from H.R.H. Prince Daniel Westling at the end of 2008. Westling explained that he and Swedish Crown Princess Victoria liked Jörgens work very much and wondered if he would be interested in composing a song exclusively for the upcoming Royal Wedding. Jörgen thanked him for being asked and he said, "It would be a great honor, and of course I want to write this song!". Immediately he began working on the lyrics and the music, which ultimately would take him more than a year to perfect. The two singers who recorded and performed the duet during the wedding ceremony was the Swedish artists Björn Skifs and Agnes. The Royal Wedding took place on Saturday June 19, 2010, in the Church of St. Nicholas, the Stockholm Cathedral. H.R.H. Crown Princess Victoria and H.R.H. Prince Daniel, Duke of Västergötland, were wed in front of more than 1,200 attending wedding guests as well as millions of TV spectators around the world. Accompanied by The Royal Stockholm Philharmonic Orchestra and a chamber choir, Björn Skifs and Agnes performed "When You Tell the World You’re Mine".

Jörgen Elofsson said: "It was a truly emotional moment for me. For getting this chance to play a small part of the Royal Wedding I will be forever grateful and very proud."

== Work with Kelly Clarkson ==
In 2002, he co-wrote the winning song, "A Moment Like This", for the inaugural season of American Idol, won by Kelly Clarkson. It became Jörgen's first #1 on the Billboard Hot 100.

On February 8, 2012, he could celebrate his second one, co-writing Clarkson's "Stronger (What Doesn't Kill You)". It remained at #1 for two weeks, dropped a few positions the third week, only to return to the top spot seven days later, which makes it her longest-running number one single in the US.

Kelly Clarkson also set a new US list record with "Stronger", by topping the Billboard Hot 100, Country Songs, Adult Contemporary, Adult Pop Songs and Dance/Club Play Songs charts. On December 5, 2013, it was announced his co-written "Stronger (What Doesn't Kill You)" was Grammy Award nominated for Song of the Year. Further more, Clarkson's album Stronger turned out being nominated in three other categories; Best Pop Vocal Album, Record of the Year and Best Pop Solo Performance.

== Work with Agnetha Fältskog ==
On May 13, 2013, Jörgen released A which is the fifth English language studio album by Swedish recording artist Agnetha Fältskog, formerly a member of the group ABBA. It is her twelfth studio album overall. Jörgen wrote or co-wrote every song on the album and co-produced the album with Peter Nordahl. Elofsson told author Paul Stenning that year: "I love it when I can get really close to an artist, like I've done with Agnetha. She truly made me a better writer just because she made me try much harder."

On 31 August 2023, the song Where Do We Go From Here produced and written by Elofsson and Kamilla Bayrak was released, from A+, a 'reimagining' of the album 2013 album. The album was released October 13, 2023.

== Kung Fury ==
In late 2014 Jörgen received a request of writing a song for the upcoming English-language Swedish martial arts action comedy short film "Kung Fury" written, directed by, and starring David Sandberg, who had become a Kickstarter Sensation. Jörgen co-wrote & produced the song "True Survivor". And the song was later recorded with the well-known actor & artist David Hasselhoff. Later on they produced a music video of the song "True Survivor", which debuted on April 16, 2015.

On May 20, 2019, the music video almost 39 million views on YouTube

== Celine Dion – Work with Courage ==
On June 8, 2019, Celine Dion ended her record-breaking 1,141 shows over the last 16 years at Caesars Palace in Las Vegas. She surprised the audience by performing a brand new song called "Flying on My Own", the first single from her album Courage released November 2019. The song, released June 28, 2019, and was written by Jörgen Elofsson, Liz Rodrigues and Anton "Hybrid" Mårtensson. The song was also co-produced by Jörgen, along with Ugly Babies & Hybrid. He also co-wrote the two other songs "Nobody's Watching" & "Say Yes" from the album. The album "Courage" scored her first No. 1 Album in Over 17 Years on Billboard 200 Chart on the 24th of November, 2019.

== Other facts ==
On May 7, 2013, Janet Leon announced her new single "New Colours", that was written by Leon, Elofsson, Lisa Desmond and Jesper Jakobsson. "New Colours" was chosen as the official song for Stockholm Pride 2013.

On October 8, 2015, Jörgen Elofsson received the Honorary Award of SKAP (Swedish composers and lyricists).

He wrote the Irish entry for the Eurovision Song Contest 2017 called "Dying to Try" sung by Brendan Murray.

In 2016 and 2017 he wrote songs along with singer Rhys after discovering her while she sang demos.

== Writing discography ==
1994

- Carola "Guld i dina ögon"

1998

- Aikakone "Aikapyörä"
- Aikakone "Magiaa"
- Aikakone "Valokuva"
- Boyzone "Will Be Yours"

1999

- Britney Spears "(You Drive Me) Crazy"
- Britney Spears "Sometimes"
- Britney Spears "Walk on By" (covered by Gareth Gates)
- Westlife "If I Let You Go"
- Westlife "Try Again"
- Meja Beckman "Do the Angels Have a Home"
- Meja Beckman "Don't Push the River"

2000

- Bellefire "I Can Make You Fall in Love Again"
- Britney Spears "Girl in the Mirror"
- Britney Spears "What U See (Is What U Get)"
- Devotion 2 Music "Blah Blah Blah"
- Emilia "Before I Fall"
- Jessica Folcker "Love You Like a Fool"
- Lucy Street "Girl Next Door"
- Lucy Street "Goodbye"
- Lucy Street "Life Is a Lovesong"
- Lucy Street "Loves Me Loves Me Not"
- Lucy Street "Second Time Around"
- Peter Jöback "Higher"
- Peter Jöback "Tonight"
- Peter Jöback "If I Could Be The One"
- R Angels "Left To Right"
- Steps "It's the Way You Make Me Feel"
- Steps "Mars and Venus (We Fall in Love Again)"
- Trybe "We Are Invincible"
- Westlife "Fool Again"
- Westlife "Dreams Come True"
- Westlife "I Lay My Love On You"
- Westlife "Puzzle Of My Heart"
- Westlife "Somebody Needs You"
- Westlife "Tunnel Of Love"
- Westlife "My Love"
- Human Nature "Whisper Your Name (The Only One)"
- Aaron Carter "Girl You Shine"
- Dream Street "It Happens Every Time"

2001

- 3 of Hearts "Is It Love"
- Alsou "Let It Be Me"
- Britney Spears "When I Found You"
- Geri Halliwell "It's Heaven, It's Hell (Being Geri Halliwell)"
- Geri Halliwell "Love Is the Only Light"
- Jennie Löfgren "Dreams"
- Jennie Löfgren "Somewhere"
- Robyn "Say You'll Walk the Distance"
- Tess "Viva l'Amor"
- Westlife "I Cry" (Covered by Shayne Ward)

2002

- Gareth Gates "Anyone of Us (Stupid Mistake)"
- Gareth Gates "What My Heart Wants to Say"
- H & Claire "Let Me Carry You"
- H & Claire "No Turning Back"
- H & Claire "You're a Love Song"
- Kaci "Everlasting/Eternamente"
- Jamie Meyer "Psycho"
- Jessica Andersson "Perfect Bliss"
- Kelly Clarkson "A Moment Like This" (covered by Leona Lewis)
- Mathias Holmgren "Något som kan hända" (Swedish version of "Anyone of Us (Stupid Mistake)" by Gareth Gates)
- Priscilla "Bla Bla Bla" (French version of "Blah Blah Blah" by Devotion 2 Music)
- Priscilla "Plus" (French version of "1–2–3" by Nikki Cleary)
- Westlife "Unbreakable"
- Westlife "Evergreen" (covered by Will Young and Gareth Gates)

2003

- Gareth Gates "Say It Isn't So"
- Guy Sebastian "Angels Brought Me Here"
- Jamie Meyer "Good Girl"
- Jamie Meyer "Last Goodbye, First Hello"
- Jessica Andersson "Ett kort ögonblick" (Swedish version of "A Moment Like This" by Kelly Clarkson)
- Nikki Cleary "1–2–3"
- Nina "What If"

2004

- Charlotte Perrelli "Gone Too Long"
- Daniel Lindström "Coming True"
- Darin "Why Does It Rain"
- Fredrik Kempe "With You All the Time"
- Ana Johnsson "Life"
- Ana Johnsson "We Are"
- Hanna Pakarinen "Love Is Like a Song"
- Jodie-Joy "I Still Believe"

2005

- Agnes "Let Me Carry You" (covered from H & Claire)
- Agnes "Right Here, Right Now (My Heart Belongs To You)" (covered by Raffaëla Paton)
- Die Happy "Big Big Trouble"
- Shayne Ward "That's My Goal"
- Twill "Before I Fall"
- Twill "Is It Love"
- Twill "One Step At A Time"

2006

- Agnes "I Had A Feelin'"
- Agnes "Kick Back Relax"
- Agnes "What Do I Do With All This Love"
- Alexander Klaws "This Is What It Feels Like"
- D-Side "No One"
- Darin "Homeless" (covered by Leona Lewis)
- Il Divo & Celine Dion "I Believe in You"
- Il Divon& Toni Braxton "Time of Our Lives"
- Marie Serneholt "Beyond Tonight"
- Marie Serneholt "The Boy I Used To Know"
- Marie Serneholt "Calling All Detectives"
- Marie Serneholt "Can't Be Love"
- Marie Serneholt "Enjoy the Ride"
- Marie Serneholt "I Love Making Love in the Morning"
- Marie Serneholt "I Need a House"
- Marie Serneholt "Oxygen"
- Marie Serneholt' "That's The Way My Heart Goes"
- Marie Serneholt "Wasted Love"
- Markus Fagervall "Everything Changes"
- Shayne Ward "Someone to Love"

2007

- Ari Koivunen "On the Top of the World"
- Erik Segerstedt "Freeway"
- Erik Segerstedt "Everything Changes"
- Fabienne Louves "Wach uf!"
- Fabienne Louves "Wenn nüt meh got" (Swiss version of "Right Here, Right Now (My Heart Belongs To You)" by Agnes)
- Katherine Jenkins "How Do You Leave the One You Love?"
- Martin Stosch "I Can Reach Heaven From Here"
- No Angels "I Had a Feeling"
- Part Six "What's That Sound"
- Part Six "Perfect World"
- Westlife "You Must Have Had a Broken Heart"

2008

- Céline Dion "There Comes a Time"
- E.M.D. "For You"
- E.M.D. "She's My California"
- Fady Maalouf "Blessed"
- Il Divo "La promessa"
- Same Difference "We R One"
- Kevin Borg "With Every Bit Of Me"

2009

- Paloma Faith "Stargazer"
- The Saturdays "Lose Control"
- Sheri "U Got Me Good"
- Super Junior "What If"

2010

- Jennifer Rush "Windows"
- Jennifer Rush "I Never Asked For An Angel"
- Jennifer Rush "I'm Not Dreaming Anymore"
- Tommy Reeve "Believe It Like I Do"
- Charice "All That I Need To Survive"
- Erik Grönwall "When You Fall"
- Agnes & Björn Skifs – When You Tell The World You're Mine

2011

- Edita Abdieski "The Key"
- Namie Amuro "make it happen (feat. AFTERSCHOOL)"
- Jennifer Lopez "Until It Beats No More"
- Eric Saade "Someone New"
- Eric Saade "Big Love"
- Kelly Clarkson "Stronger (What Doesn't Kill You)"
- Girls' Generation "Bad Girl"
- Björn Skifs "Break The Spell"
- Björn Skifs "Let's Kiss"
- Björn Skifs "Back to Where We Started From"
- Björn Skifs "When Our Lips Touch"
- Björn Skifs "I Already Know"
- Björn Skifs "Damned If I Do"
- Björn Skifs "You Got There In the End"
- Björn Skifs "Step Right Up"
- Björn Skifs "This Is Where the Story Ends"
- Björn Skifs "You Were Loved"
- Il Divo "Senza Parole"
- Eclipse "When The River Is You"
- Eclipse "La Tua Melodia"
- Vanquish "The Harder You Love"
- Michelle "Was, Wenn Mein Herz Sich Irrt"
- Youngblood "American Girlfriend"
- Youngblood "Sleep On It"
- Youngblood "Outside Boy"

2012

- Jedward "Happens In The Dark"
- Leona Lewis "Stop The Clocks"
- Il Volo "Splendida"
- Samantha Jade "What You've Done to Me"
- Ida LaFontaine "Dancing 4 My Life"

2013

- Agnetha Fältskog "The One Who Loves You Now"
- Agnetha Fältskog "When You Really Loved Someone"
- Agnetha Fältskog "Perfume In the Breeze"
- Agnetha Fältskog "I Was A Flower"
- Agnetha Fältskog "I Should’ve Followed You Home (with Gary Barlow)
- Agnetha Fältskog "Past Forever"
- Agnetha Fältskog "Dance Your Pain Away"
- Agnetha Fältskog "Bubble"
- Agnetha Fältskog "Back On Your Radio"
- Agnetha Fältskog "I Keep Them On the Floor Beside My Bed"
- Janet Leon "New Colours"
- MainStreet "Hell's A Lot Like Love"
- Kristoffer Rahbek "Junkie For Love"

2015

- David Hasselhoff "True Survivor"

2016

- Rhys "Swallow Your Pride"

2017

- Brendan Murray "Dying To Try" (Eurovision Song Contest 2017)
- Rhys "Last Dance"
- Rhys "Too Good To Be True"
- Super Junior "The Lucky Ones"

2018

- Mariette "For You" (Melodifestivalen 2018)
- Ivy Quainoo "House on Fire" (Unser Lied für Lissabon)
- Rhys "Maybe I Will Learn"
- Luke Potter "It's Easy"
- Mariette "Time To Spare"
- Felizia K "Chameleon Girl"
- Rhys "No Vacancy"
- Rhys "Spite My Flaws"
- Rhys (feat. Felix Sandman) "Starfish"
- Rhys "You'll Never Know"
- Rhys "Better Be Over"
- Rhys "Doomed"
- Rhys "On My Own"
- Sanna Nielsen "Christmas Candle"
- Laura Tesoro "Mutual"
- Niykee Heaton "Starting Over"
- Melo Moreno "Watch Love Die"

2019

- Celine Dion "Flying On My Own"
- Celine Dion "Nobody's Watching"
- Celine Dion "Say Yes"

2020

- Demi Lovato "In the Mirror" from the 2020 film Eurovision Song Contest: The Story of Fire Saga
- Faith Kakembo "Crying Rivers" (Melodifestivalen 2020)
- Nissy "Do Do"
- David Hasselhoff "I Will Carry You"
- Thomas Stenström "Drömmare"
- Darin "What's Christmas Anyway"

2023

- Wild Youth "We Are One" (Eurovision Song Contest 2023)
- Agnetha Fältskog "Where Do We Go From Here?"

== Awards and nominations ==
| Year | Association | Nominated work | Category | Result |
|---|---|---|---|---|
| 2000 | The Record Of The Year | "My Love (Westlife song)" | The Record Of The Year – UK | Won |
| 2003 | SMFF | " Anyone Of Us" | The Swedish Song Of The Year | Won |
| 2003 | SMFF | Jörgen Elofsson | The Biggest International Success Of The Year | Won |
| 2006 | Ivor Novello Award | "That's My Goal" | Best Selling UK Single | Won |
| 2007 | Brit Award | "A Moment Like This" | Best Selling British Single | Nominated |
| 2007 | Ivor Novello Award | "A Moment Like This" | Best Selling UK Single | Won |
| 2007 | Daytime Emmy Award | "So Good" | Outstanding Original Song – Children's/Animated | Nominated |
| 2012 | —N/a | Jörgen Elofsson | H. M. The King's Medal | Honoured |
| 2013 | Grammy Award | "Stronger (What Doesn't Kill You)" | Song of the Year | Nominated |
| 2015 | —N/a | Jörgen Elofsson | Honoured Award of SKAP | Honoured |
