= List of unreleased songs recorded by ABBA =

This is a list of songs that were either recorded or written by Swedish pop group ABBA, but which – for various reasons – were never released during the band's active years (1972–1982; 2016–2021). Some of the songs were later released in their entirety or in parts on the track "ABBA Undeleted" (included in the 1994 box set Thank You for the Music), while other songs were released as part of solo projects.

== Björn & Benny, Agnetha & Anni-Frid era ==
=== 1972 ===
- "Den Stora Kärleken"

== ABBA era ==
=== 1974 ===
- "Ricky Rock 'N' Roller" is a song recorded during the recording sessions for ABBA's self-titled album in 1974. The Swedish rock star Jerry Williams recorded and released it as a single after ABBA had decided their version was unsuitable for release. An excerpt of the demo of the song was released on the box set Thank You for the Music.
- "Here Comes Rubie Jamie" is the working title of a song recorded in 1974, which had acquired the name "Terra Del Fuego" by the time the lyrics were recorded. The song is unique in that it is the only studio recording to feature lead vocals by all four ABBA members. An excerpt of the song (where only Benny and Frida are heard) was released on the box set Thank You for the Music. The excerpt was particularly edited so as not to include the chorus, as it is said that Björn and Benny violently dislike it. This explains why it is not named after its original title, but named to not refer to the chorus.
- "Baby" is the early demo version of "Rock Me" recorded in 1974 with the lead vocals by Agnetha. An excerpt of this song was released on the box set Thank You for the Music. "Didn't I" is the title of a demo of the song worked on before "Baby".
- "Radio 1 Jingle" is a short re-recording of "Waterloo" with different lyrics. It was sometimes used for the BBC radio 1 as a theme song.
- "A Funny, Funny Way" is the possible title of a demo of a song recorded in September 1974.

=== 1975 ===
- "To Live with You" is an attempt to record the song "Lycka" (previously released by Björn and Benny for their first album by the same title, and also recorded by Frida on her debut album) in English. The demo recording dates from 1975, and was later released on the remastered CD of Björn and Benny's Lycka album in May 2006.
- "Dancing Queen" (early version) is a demo version with an additional verse. It can be heard in footage of the Dancing Queen recording session from Mr. Trendsetter, a 1975 Swedish documentary. This footage is included on the DVD of the Arrival deluxe edition. The extra verse consists of: "Baby, baby, you're out of sight / Hey, you're looking alright tonight / When you come to the party / Listen to the guys / They've got the look in their eyes". The song then resumes with: "You're a teaser, you turn them on".
- "I Do, I Do, I Do, I Do, I Do" (early version) is a demo version with an extra verse. This verse is: "Let's get together, every day we'll be better / I love you, I do, I do, I do, I do, I do / Leave it or take it, I believe we can make it / Don't you too? I do, I do, I do, I do, I do".
- "Tango" is an early version of "Fernando" with Swedish lyrics. An excerpt was included in the ABBA Undeleted medley on the 1994 box set Thank You For the Music. A completed version of the song with the same lyrics was released in 1975 by Frida on her solo album "Ensam".
- "I Want You" is an Arrival-era demo recorded in 1975. Parts of this demo was later used for the intro to "Does Your Mother Know".

=== 1976 ===
- "Funky Feet" is a song recorded during the Arrival sessions that was ultimately dropped due to its similarity to "Dancing Queen". The song was later recorded by Svenne & Lotta, Australian group The Studs, Alcazar, and the Swedish ABBA tribute band Arrival, A section from the beginning of the song was later re-used for the 1982 track "I Am the City".
- "National Song" is a short track recorded for the Australian TV commercial of the National appliances. It is a re-recording of "Fernando" with new lyrics, using the backing track from the song.
- "Monsieur, Monsieur" is the title of the early demo version of "My Love, My Life" with lead vocals by Agnetha.
- "Memory Lane" is a third title of "Why Did It Have to Be Me"/"Happy Hawaii" that is said to have been recorded but never released. Benny and Bjorn said it was lacking something.
- "Gypsy Girl" was an alternative name for "Money, Money, Money" with different backing vocals. A demo was recorded but the title was changed back to "Money, Money, Money".

=== 1977 ===
- "I Am an A" is a song written for the band's European and Australian tour with lyrics written by all four members, jokingly depicting themselves as A, B, B and A. The song was never considered for a studio version, but parts of the chorus was later reused in "Free as a Bumblebee", and as that song never progressed beyond the demo, the chorus later surfaced during the Chess songwriting sessions as the 1985 UK No. 1 hit "I Know Him So Well".
- "Get On the Carousel" is another song from ABBA's 1977 tour, written for the mini-musical The Girl with the Golden Hair. The song was considered too weak to progress further, but the chorus surfaced as a melody line in "Hole in Your Soul" (the part "...ahaa-, the songs you sing are too romantic..."). "Get On the Carousel" appears in ABBA: The Movie.
- "Scaramouche" is a demo instrumental recording from 1977. Some parts surfaced in the recording sessions for "Chess" and resulted in a melody line in the track "Merano". An excerpt of this song was released on the box set Thank You for the Music.
- "Billy Boy" is the early version of "Take a Chance on Me". An excerpt of the track was released on the box set Thank You for the Music.
- "Golden Dreams and Golden Lies", "Love for Me Is Love Forever" a.k.a. "Yippee Yay", "Big John" and "Joanne" are early versions of "Move On".
- "I Believe in You" is a song recorded on July 19, 1977. It has never been publicly released.
- "High on Your Love" is the first version of the song "Hole in Your Soul", recorded in August 1977.

=== 1978 ===
- "Free as a Bumblebee" a.k.a. "Svantes Inferno" is a demo recorded in 1978 with lead vocals by Björn and Benny, released on the box set Thank You For The Music. Part of the chorus was later reused in "I Know Him So Well" from the musical Chess.
- "Mountain Top"/"Dr.Claus Von Hamlet Nos. 1, 2 and 3" are several demos recorded in 1978. The composition underwent several changes and [fun] demo titles during the sessions. At one point the demo featured lyrics and vocals by Björn entitled "Mountain Top", and another instrumental attempt ("Part I"), and later reworking "Part 2" (with lead vocals by Agnetha and Frida) was released on the box set Thank You for the Music. Parts of the composition would re-surface in the June 1980 demo "Burning My Bridges", but eventually the song was defined as a 'schottis' and put aside until Benny made his first instrumental folk album Klinga Mina Klockor in 1987, where it was named "Lottis Schottis".
- "Summer Night City" (early mixes) according to Michael B. Tretow, there are over 30 different mixes of the song preserved on old tapes, some which are very different from that which was later released as a single. One version was released on the 1994 box set Thank You for the Music, with an instrumental string introduction. This version (in an improved edit) was released on the 2005 release The Complete Studio Recordings and again on the 2010 "Deluxe" edition of the Voulez-Vous album. One working title for an early version of "Summer Night City" was "Kalle Skändare", while Carl Magnus Palm suggests one title for another complete version would be "You're a Night Demon".
- "Just a Notion" (1978 version) is a track recorded in September 1978. Although progressing beyond the demo stage, Benny and Bjorn went off it pretty quickly, deeming it to be “unmixable” and therefore leaving it unreleased. However a snippet of a rough mix by Michael B. Tretow was released on the box set Thank You for the Music in 1994. A complete version was recorded by cover band Arrival, which occasionally featured original ABBA bass player Rutger Gunnarsson as a special guest, and was included on their 1999 album First Flight. This recording features a full set of lyrics (which are identical to those which ABBA used), unlike the small snippet of the released ABBA version. Carl Magnus Palm has also confirmed that the verse included in the "ABBA Undeleted" medley is in fact the second verse of the song. It was released on October 22, 2021 for the album Voyage, two weeks before the album release. Benny recorded a new backing track with drums and guitars, but the vocals are from the 1978 version.
- "Crying Over You" is a demo recorded in 1978 with lead vocals by Björn. An excerpt of the track was released on the box set Thank You for the Music.
- "Kålsupare", "In the Arms of Rosalita", "Kålsupare II", and "Three Wise Guys" are early demo versions of "Chiquitita". An excerpt of "In the Arms of Rosalita" can be heard in the TV documentary The Winner Takes It All, with the lyrics "Happy as you can be in the arms of Rosalita you're a man with love in your heart" (featuring lead vocals by Frida). A later version "Chiquitita Angelina" was sung by both girls in unison.
- "Nämndöfjärden" is an instrumental demo recorded on December 13, 1978, with Benny playing synthesizers. The track remains unreleased.

=== 1979 ===
- "I Can Do It" is an early demo of "Does Your Mother Know" recorded in February 1979.
- "I Wrote a Song" is an early demo of "I Have a Dream", recorded in March 1979.
- "Sång till Görel" is a tribute song for Görel Johnsen's 30th birthday recorded in 1979. It was never commercially released; however, a very limited number of records were pressed and given to people who attended the party.
- "Lady Bird" is a song with no vocals recorded, later used in "Someone Else's Story" from the musical Chess.
- "And the Wind Cries Mary" is a demo recording from June 25, 1979, and does not feature any vocals.
- "Rubber Ball Man" is a song never officially released. An excerpt of this track was released on the box set Thank You for the Music. The bridge to this song was later used for the 1982 track "Under Attack".
- "Under My Sun" is a demo version, containing dummy lyrics, of "Rubber Ball Man", recorded in early 1979. The lyrics do not make sense - they were recorded so that Björn could get a feel for the sound of the song, before any real lyrics were to be written. The lead vocals are shared by Agnetha and Frida. The melody of the verse would later be heard as a part of the melody for the verses in "Under Attack" ("and every day the hold is getting tighter.../I wish there was a way that I could show you...").
- "No Man's Land" is a song which is believed was recorded in 1979 by ABBA. It may have been an early demo/working title for "Voulez-Vous" or "As Good as New". It was stated in a newspaper that the song was to be included on the Voulez-Vous album.
- "The Devil In Miss Jones" is a song believed to have been a demo version of "The King Has Lost His Crown" or "If It Wasn't for the Nights". Very little else is known about this song.
- "Does Your Mother Know" (live version) has a different "rock" introduction. It was performed live several times before the official album version was released. When ABBA visited Spain during 1979, it was performed with the Spanish title, "Lo Sabe Tu Madre?".
- "Been and Gone and Done It" is a demo of "Gimme! Gimme! Gimme! (A Man After Midnight)" recorded on August 9, 1979.

=== 1980 ===
- "Burning My Bridges" is a country/rockabilly song recorded in 1980 with lead vocal by Björn. An excerpt of this track was released on the box set Thank You for the Music.
- "Hold Me Close" is an early version of "Andante, Andante", recorded in April 1980.
- "The Story of My Life" is an early demo version of "The Winner Takes It All", recorded in summer 1980.
- "The Winner Takes It All" (early version) features a beginning similar to the final version. However, towards the end, Björn Ulvaeus takes over lead vocals, singing the lines: "The gods may throw a dice, their minds as cold as ice. And someone way down here loses someone dear. The winner takes it all, the loser has to fall, it’s simple and it’s plain. So why should I complain?". After the track was cut, the backing vocals of the other members were overdubbed. Björn mentioned in an interview that they "wanted to try if it would work", but this idea was later abandoned for the final version.

=== 1981 ===
- "Hovas Vittne" is a song sung in Swedish, recorded as a tribute to Stig Anderson's 50th birthday in 1981, and released only on 200 red vinyl copies that were distributed to the guests attending the party. The title is a play on words; Hova is the small village in Västergötland in which Anderson was born, and Vittne is a reference to Jehovah's Witnesses. The song includes a four bar passage that was later used in the Chess ouverture "Merano".
- "Tivedshambo" is an instrumental recording of Stig Anderson's first published song, recorded in 1981. It is the B-side of "Hovas Vittne".
- "When All Is Said and Done" (demo version and various mixes) is an instrumental track recorded in 1981 with a different bridge. A version with vocals featured a more emotional repetition of the first verse after the third, making the track 4:20 instead of 3:15. When the song's video was released in 1981 it featured another alternate version with a different ending.
- "Nationalsång" is an instrumental track that later was used in "Anthem" from the musical Chess. The track has often been erroneously listed as "Opus 10" on various bootleg releases, a name commonly attributed to ABBA’s fabled abandoned ninth studio album. Benny Andersson acknowledged use of the title ‘Opus 10’ in a 1985 Dutch article entitled 'New Recording Sessions Delayed by Secret Audio Tapes,' but it has never been used by ABBA themselves. Rather it was a phrase used in passing by a Swedish journalist writing about ABBA returning to the studio in 1982.
- "I Am a Musician" is an instrumental demo track recorded in 1981. The song was later included in the musical ABBAcadabra, and recorded by B. A. Robertson with the slightly altered title "(I Am) The Seeker". The melody to the chorus was later used by Benny in the song "Upp Till Dig" from his 2007 album, BAO 3.
- "I Am That Woman" is a song with a similar chorus to "(I Am) The Seeker", but with different verses, recorded in May 1981.
- "Fanfare for Icehockey World Championships '81" is a short instrumental track written for the Ice Hockey World Championship hosted by Sweden in 1981. It was used as the jingle/opening theme for the television special Dick Cavett Meets ABBA.
- "Two for the Price of One" (early demo version) has slightly different lyrics, and is sung from a first person perspective ("I am a young man with a simple occupation/I clean the toilets of the local railway station/There's no romance in my life/Sometimes I wish I had a knife").
- "Givin' a Little More" is a demo recorded in 1981 with lead vocals by Björn. A drummer was not used for the song, instead a Linn LM-1 drum machine was featured. An excerpt of this track was released on the box set Thank You for the Music.
- "Twinkle Twinkle Little Star" is an early demo of "Like an Angel Passing Through My Room". This song was re-worked into "Another Morning Without You", featuring Frida on vocals. A second version of "Another Morning Without You" features shared lead vocals by Agnetha and Frida. Both versions featured a full backing band in parts of the song instead of the synth only backing that was eventually released. This song then moved through several versions entitled "An Angel Walked Through My Room" and "An Angel's Passing Through My Room" with both Frida and Agnetha on lead vocals. The track was at some point arranged and mixed in the disco-style of "Lay All Your Love on Me" and later heavily reworked. An entirely instrumental version of "Like An Angel Passing Through My Room" also exists and was played on Swedish radio in 1986.
- "Sinking Deeper" is the possible working title of a demo of a song recorded in October 1981.
- "Den första" is a series of rough mixes and the working title of the song "The Visitors", recorded in October 1981.

=== 1982 ===
- "When the Waves Roll Out to the Sea" is an unused instrumental track featuring Benny on piano.
- "Just Like That" was originally supposed to be included on ABBA's never completed ninth studio album. Parts of the song was later used in the song "Under Attack" (1982). A demo of a new version with different verses was recorded by Elaine Paige in 1984 during the "Chess"-sessions, but the song remained unreleased. Gemini recorded and released the new version in 1985. Cover versions of both the original version and the Gemini-version has since been released by amo. Angelika Milster under the German title "Einfach So" (1987), The Webb (1996), Björn Again (1993), and Abbacadabra (2014). The song was originally intended to become part of Mamma Mia! musical but this did not happen, though a snippet of the 1982 recording was made available in "ABBA Undeleted" on the Thank You for the Music box set.
- "Under Attack" (early version) features a triple drum pattern in both the song’s intro and bridge. This version is longer than the final release, with an extended intro and an additional repetition of the chorus towards the end.

=== 1983 ===
- "Every Good Man" is a demo version of the song "Heaven Help My Heart", which was later recorded by Elaine Paige and included on the Chess concept album and later in the stage show. The track is not strictly an ABBA demo; it was written and always intended exclusively for Chess. The track does, however, feature Agnetha on lead vocals and Benny on synthesizer/piano. The song was recorded in January 1983.

=== 2016–2021 ===
ABBA recorded 12 songs for their reunion album Voyage, but only ten were finished and released on the final tracklist, with Anderson stating they decided to "work on the ones we think we should keep on the album". There are no plan to release the unfinished songs. Benny Anderson did talk about them in an interview with German WDR 4 from November 2021, saying "we had actually 12 ... They're sort of good stuff, but not really finished. It takes more work, for me, at least, in the studio."

- "Hit By a Train" is an unreleased song that was originally revealed to exist by Lasse Wellander. Little Boots, a member of the original ABBA Voyage backing band, described it as "upbeat" and "dark".

== Other complete songs ==
=== "Just Like That" ===
"Just Like That" was recorded in May 1982. It has yet to be officially released in its entirety, though a complete bootleg version is featured on the album ABBA - We Owed You One on the Mistrial Music label. Benny and Björn have stated that the song sounded 'wrong': the verse and chorus did not fit together, and that is why it was scrapped. The two men admit this happens regularly in their way of writing music: a mediocre song can become a bridge or a riff for another song, and a good melody line can lie around for many years until it surfaces in a composition. Benny and Björn nevertheless allowed for a 'snippet' of "Just Like That" to be released in a 'medley' track on the box set Thank You for the Music in 1994. Although this snippet only revealed the chorus of the track, it is notable for featuring a saxophone solo by Raphael Ravenscroft, perhaps best known for his famous saxophone riff on Gerry Rafferty's 1978 hit "Baker Street". This was one of the very few times that ABBA used a musician outside the usual ABBA circle.

Other recordings of "Just Like That" exist; a version features a guitar riff that eventually made its way into the verse melody of the song "Under Attack" ("Don't know how to take it/don't know where to go/my resistance running low..."), while another interpretation has come to be known as the 'na na na' (or 'la la la') version, where Agnetha is heard singing 'na na na na's on top of the instrumental melody. In 1994, Agnetha had discussed the song: "I haven't heard it in several years, but I remember it as a very good song and recording. It is one of my big favourites, and I hope it's going to be released one day".

The solution to "Just Like That" came in separating the song parts Benny and Björn felt didn't belong together, and in slowing down the tempo considerably. The song first re-emerged as a demo for "Chess", only a year or two after the discarded ABBA version, rearranged as a dramatic instrumental ballad and discarding the original chorus melody. The song, now titled "When the Waves Roll Out to Sea", didn't progress further in the production, however. In 1985, a new version of "Just Like That", which this time kept the original chorus but discarded the original verses, was released by Swedish duo Gemini, on their eponymous album, produced by Björn, Benny and Anders Glenmark (one half of Gemini). "Just Like That" was later released as a single. Gemini also performed the song live in the UK (with Benny playing the synthesizer) on Terry Wogan's chat show. Finally, the discarded verse melody found its home in "Glöm Mig Om Du Kan", released on the Swedish version of the "Chess" musical in 2002, "Chess på Svenska".

"Just Like That" was originally intended to be featured in the ABBA musical, Mamma Mia!, sung as a love duet between Sophie and Sky, but was removed during rehearsals, as it apparently did not advance the story.

=== "From a Twinkling Star to a Passing Angel" ===
Released on April 23, 2012, the special "Deluxe Edition" of the album The Visitors includes the previously unreleased "From a Twinkling Star to a Passing Angel", which is a medley of various versions of the Visitors closing track, "Like an Angel Passing Through My Room". It marks the first release of previously unreleased material since 1994.

== Previously unreleased songs ==
=== 1978 ===
- "Dream World" is a song recorded in September 1978 during sessions for the Voulez-Vous album. Benny and Björn decided, however, that "Dream World" was not suitable for release, and instead, agreed to scrap the recording. The melody and chord sequence of the middle-eight of "Dream World" were re-used, with different lyrics, as the bridge for the middle-eight of the song "Does Your Mother Know," later released as the second single from the Voulez-Vous album. In the 1980s, the song was heard for the first time in a Swedish radio programme featuring ABBA's engineer Michael B. Tretow, and subsequently found its way onto a bootleg album. In 1994, "Dream World" was released in Sweden, Germany and Australia as a promotional-only CD-single with other ABBA rarities to advertise the Thank You for the Music four CD box-set, which also contained the track. The version of the song released in 1994 differs from the version heard in the radio show in that its fairground-like synthesiser intro fades in rather than starting abruptly. It was reported just before its 1994 release that Benny and Björn were in the studio remixing the track, and hence it is most probably a new mixdown of the song done expressly in 1994. Indeed it exhibits a certain "digital" sound suggesting it was mixed down to a digital recorder as opposed to previously released songs from this period which were mixed onto analog tape. Elements of the track were included in the 1982 song Under Attack.

=== 1979 ===
- "I'm Still Alive" is a song performed by the band during their 1979 tour, but was never recorded in the studio. Having been bootlegged for years, a professional recording of this song made at Wembley Arena was released on CD in 2014, thus making "I'm Still Alive" officially available for the first time.

=== 1980 ===
- "Put On Your White Sombrero" is a song based on waltz with a Latin-American sound recorded in 1980 with Frida on lead vocals. The track was originally intended to be released on the 1980 album Super Trouper. However, it was eventually replaced by that album's title track. The song remained unreleased until 1994, when it was included on the box set Thank You for the Music (as well as the promo CD-single "Dream World"). It has since appeared as a bonus track on subsequent reissues of the Super Trouper album, and also features on the 2005 release The Complete Studio Recordings. The general feel of the song, including its time signature and arrangement were re-used in 1982 for the song "Cassandra".

=== 1982 ===
- "I Am the City" was recorded in May 1982, the 8th, originally for inclusion on what would have been ABBA's ninth studio album. However, these plans were soon abandoned, the group instead settling for a double-compilation album release of their most successful singles, The Singles: The First Ten Years (released in November 1982). As a result of this, "I Am the City" remained unreleased for eleven years until it was first commercially released on the 1993 compilation album More ABBA Gold: More ABBA Hits. Previously, the song had surfaced on bootleg recordings. Interesting to note is that parts of the song borrows the melody from Björn and Benny's Inga Theme released in 1970.
