= Kisses of Fire =

- US Atlantic Records b-side label

Song by ABBA

from the album Voulez-Vous
- A-side: "Does Your Mother Know"
- Recorded: 13 March 1978 – 29 March 1979
- Studio: Polar Studios (Stockholm, Sweden)
- Genre: Disco; electro
- Length: 3:16
- Label: Polar
- Songwriters: Benny Andersson; Björn Ulvaeus
- Producers: Benny Andersson; Björn Ulvaeus

Voulez-Vous track listing
- 10 tracks: 1. "As Good as New"; 2. "Voulez-Vous"; 3. "I Have a Dream"; 4. "Angeleyes"; 5. "The King Has Lost His Crown"; 6. "Does Your Mother Know"; 7. "If It Wasn't for the Nights"; 8. "Chiquitita"; 9. "Lovers (Live a Little Longer)"; 10. "Kisses of Fire"

Audio video
- "Kisses of Fire" on YouTube

"Kisses of Fire" is a song recorded by the Swedish recording group ABBA, featured on their sixth studio album Voulez-Vous (1979). It serves as the standard edition's closing track. Agnetha Fältskog sings the lead vocals to the track, with the other members providing backing vocals. "Kisses of Fire" was featured as a B-side to "Does Your Mother Know" and the Japanese and Spanish releases of the title track.

== Production and release ==
On 22 January 1979, Björn Ulvaeus and Benny Andersson went abroad to the Bahamas on a working trip to write new songs. They came up with up to four songs on this trip, one of which was given the working title of "Tidemas Blåsning" and released as "Kisses Of Fire".

The track was recorded at Polar Studios in Stockholm, Sweden, on 7 February 1979, and mixed on 1 March 1979.

"Kisses of Fire" was released as the B-side to the single "Does Your Mother Know" in April 1979, shortly before the release of the Voulez-Vous album. The single peaked outside the UK top 3, possibly as a consequence of the lead vocals in "Does Your Mother Know" being sung by Björn rather than Agnetha or Frida. "Kisses of Fire" was considered to be a much more typical ABBA track. In Venezuela, “Kisses Of Fire” was released as an A-Side, with “Does Your Mother Know” as the B-Side.

The song was featured in Mamma Mia! Here We Go Again, performed by Panos Mouzourakis.

== Critical reception ==
Simon Sheridan, author of The Complete ABBA, described "Kisses of Fire" as featuring undertones of Kate Bush and "some galloping electro keyboard woven clearly throughout the girls' breathlessness." Chris Coplan named it one of the group's five best songs for the Phoenix New Times.

== Personnel ==
Taken from Abba: All The Songs: The Story Behind Every Track.

- Agnetha Fältskog – lead vocals, backing vocals
- Anni-Frid Lyngstad – backing vocals
- Benny Andersson – synthesizers, piano, backing vocals
- Björn Ulvaeus – backing vocals
- Lasse Wellander – acoustic guitar
- Rutger Gunnarsson – bass guitar
- Ola Brunkert – drums
