= If It Wasn't for the Nights =

Song by ABBA

from the album Voulez-Vous
- Recorded: 8 November 1978 (According to later accounts of the sessions, the track was subsequently reworked during the Bahamas recordings, where a new backing track was made after the band completed the rhythm track for "Voulez-Vous".)
- Studio: Polar Studios (Stockholm, Sweden)
- Genre: Disco
- Length: 5:11
- Label: Polar
- Songwriters: Benny Andersson; Björn Ulvaeus
- Producers: Benny Andersson; Björn Ulvaeus

Voulez-Vous track listing
- 10 tracks: 1. "As Good as New"; 2. "Voulez-Vous"; 3. "I Have a Dream"; 4. "Angeleyes"; 5. "The King Has Lost His Crown"; 6. "Does Your Mother Know"; 7. "If It Wasn't for the Nights"; 8. "Chiquitita"; 9. "Lovers (Live a Little Longer)"; 10. "Kisses of Fire"

Audio video
- "If It Wasn't for the Nights" on YouTube

"If It Wasn't for the Nights" is a song by the Swedish recording group ABBA. The track was recorded for and included on their sixth studio album Voulez-Vous (1979). Agnetha Fältskog and Anni-Frid Lyngstad both share lead vocals on the track, which was written and produced by Benny Andersson and Björn Ulvaeus. The working title for the track was "Pandemonium". The song was initially planned as the lead single to Voulez-Vous. However, "Chiquitita" wound up being the lead single, and "If It Wasn't for the Nights" was scrapped as a single altogether, although it was later included as a B-side to "Super Trouper" in Japan.

== Background ==
The song was a reflection of Björn Ulvaeus's state of mind during his divorce from Agnetha Fältskog, an uptempo song with despairing lyrics where the narrator dreads the end of the working day, when they will be all alone to deal with their own thoughts. Ulvaeus later stated: "There were times that last autumn I was with Agnetha that I had those nights myself. My lyrics were often based around fiction, but that must have been where that one came from."

== Live performances and intended release ==
"If It Wasn't for the Nights" was considered by the band members to be one of the strongest songs recorded during the Voulez-Vous sessions, and was originally intended to be the lead single from the album. ABBA performed the song in Japan in November 1978, upon their promotional visit to the country (known as ABBA in Japan). Although ABBA did not film an official video for "If It Wasn't for the Nights", their filmed performance on the Mike Yarwood Christmas Show in December 1978 serves as an "unofficial" music video. These filmed performances of the song differ from the original 5:11 version (lasting 3:42 and 3:50).

In December 1978, a new song entitled "Chiquitita" was recorded, and it was ultimately decided that this would be released as the lead single from the Voulez-Vous album instead. As a result of this decision, "If It Wasn't for the Nights" remained an album track. "If It Wasn't for the Nights" was also planned to be the song ABBA would donate to The Music for UNICEF Concert.

== Critical reception ==
Rob Joseph of the Pittsburgh Post-Gazette described the song as an "irresistible dance number." Steve Harnell of Classic Pop said the song "returns to the easygoing groove of 'Dancing Queen'", albeit the chorus not "quite scale[ing] those giddy heights."

== Track listings and formats ==
Japanese 7-inch single

1. "Super Trouper" – 4:12
2. "If It Wasn't for the Nights" – 5:10

Record Store Day 12-inch single / 2019 7-inch single

1. "Voulez-Vous" (Extended Dance Remix) – 6:07
2. "If It Wasn't for the Nights" – 5:09
