= Greatest Hits Vol. 2 (ABBA album) =

1979 ABBA compilation album

Greatest hits album by ABBA
- Released: 29 October 1979
- Recorded: October 1974 – August 1979
- Genres: Euro pop; eurodisco
- Length: 58:34
- Labels: Polar (Sweden); Epic (UK); Atlantic (US)
- Producers: Benny Andersson; Björn Ulvaeus

ABBA chronology
Voulez-Vous (1979)	Greatest Hits Vol. 2 (1979)	Gracias Por La Música (1980)

Singles from Greatest Hits Vol. 2
- 1. "Summer Night City" Released: 6 September 1978; 2. "Gimme! Gimme! Gimme!" Released: 12 October 1979

Professional ratings
Review scores
Source	Rating
Allmusic	2/5 stars
Christgau's Record Guide	C
The Encyclopedia of Popular Music	3/5 stars

Greatest Hits Vol. 2 is a compilation album by Swedish pop group ABBA, released on October 29, 1979, to coincide with their tour of North America and Europe, which took place between September and November 1979. It was ABBA's second chart-topping album of the year (after Voulez-Vous) and featured "Gimme! Gimme! Gimme! (A Man After Midnight)", a brand new single, recorded in August 1979.

== Overview ==
A round-up of ABBA's hits since their first Greatest Hits album (released in 1975), the album exclusively included material recorded between 1976 and 1979: from Arrival, The Album, Voulez-Vous, and the non-album single "Summer Night City"). The only exception was "Rock Me", from the 1975 ABBA album, which was issued as a single, became a top 5 hit in Australia and New Zealand after the release of Greatest Hits, and was also included as part of their 1979 world tour set list.

"Angeleyes" was included primarily due to its success as a single in the UK, where it was released as a double A-side with "Voulez-Vous". Although "Voulez-Vous" had been released as a single in other parts of the world, it was not included on the album. "I Wonder (Departure)", a track not released as a single (excluding the live version that served as the B-side to "The Name of the Game"), was also featured.

Greatest Hits Vol. 2 was released on CD in 1982 by Polydor but was deleted from their ABBA CD range in 1992 when it was replaced with ABBA Gold. It was also released in the US by Atlantic Records in 1983 with the same mastering as the Polydor CD but was discontinued there in the late 1980s as well.

== Commercial reception ==
Greatest Hits Vol. 2 was certified Gold in the U.S. by the Recording Industry Association of America.

== Track listing ==
All songs are written by Benny Andersson and Björn Ulvaeus, except where noted.

Side one
No.	Title	Writer(s)	Length
1.	"Gimme! Gimme! Gimme! (A Man After Midnight)"		4:45
2.	"Knowing Me, Knowing You"	Andersson; Stig Anderson; Ulvaeus	4:02
3.	"Take a Chance on Me"		4:05
4.	"Money, Money, Money"		3:05
5.	"Rock Me"		3:03
6.	"Eagle"		5:51
7.	"Angeleyes"		4:20

Side two
No.	Title	Writer(s)	Length
1.	"Dancing Queen"	Andersson; Anderson; Ulvaeus	3:50
2.	"Does Your Mother Know"		3:13
3.	"Chiquitita"		5:26
4.	"Summer Night City"		3:34
5.	"I Wonder (Departure)"	Andersson; Anderson; Ulvaeus	4:38
6.	"The Name of the Game"	Andersson; Anderson; Ulvaeus	4:54
7.	"Thank You for the Music"		3:48
Total length:			58:34

== Personnel ==
- Agnetha Fältskog – lead vocals (1, 10, 14), co-lead vocals (3, 6, 7, 8, 9, 11, 13), backing vocals
- Anni-Frid Lyngstad – lead vocals (2, 4, 12), co-lead vocals (3, 6, 7, 8, 9, 11, 13), backing vocals
- Björn Ulvaeus – lead vocals (5, 9, 11), acoustic guitar, electric guitar, backing vocals
- Benny Andersson – keyboards, synthesizers, backing vocals

Additional musicians

- Rolf Alex – hi-hat percussion on "Summer Night City"
- Ola Brunkert – drums
- Lars Carlsson – horn
- Christer Danielson – horn
- Andrew Eijas – horn
- Malando Gassama – percussion
- Anders Glenmark – electric guitar on "Money, Money, Money"
- Rutger Gunnarsson – bass
- Gloria Lundell – harp
- Roger Palm – drums and percussion on "Take a Chance on Me", "Dancing Queen" and "Thank You for the Music", drums on "Rock Me"
- Halldor Palsson – saxophone
- Janne Schaffer – guitar
- Bengt Sundberg – horn
- Åke Sundqvist – percussion
- Mike Watson – bass on "Gimme, Gimme, Gimme (...)", "Angeleyes" and "Does Your Mother Know?"
- Lasse Wellander – guitar
- Gunnar Wenneborg – horn
- Kajtek Wojciechowski – saxophone

Production

- Benny Andersson and Björn Ulvaeus – production and arrangement
- Michael B. Tretow – engineer

== Charts ==
=== Weekly charts ===
Weekly chart performance for Greatest Hits Vol. 2
Chart (1979–81)	Peak position
Argentinian Albums (CAPIF)	1
Australian Albums (Kent Music Report)	20
Austrian Albums (Ö3 Austria)	2
Canada Top Albums/CDs (RPM)	8
Dutch Albums (Album Top 100)	2
Finnish Albums (Suomen virallinen lista)	4
German Albums (Offizielle Top 100)	6
Israeli Albums (IBA)	4
Japanese Albums (Oricon)	2
New Zealand Albums (RMNZ)	3
Norwegian Albums (VG-lista)	25
Spanish Albums (AFE)	3
Swedish Albums (Sverigetopplistan)	20
UK Albums (Official Charts)	1
US Billboard 200	46
US Top 100 Albums (Cash Box)	44
US The Album Chart (Record World)	39

=== Year-end charts ===
Year-end chart performance for Greatest Hits Vol. 2
Chart (1980)	Position
Austrian Albums (Ö3 Austria)	3
Canada Top Albums/CDs (RPM)	26
Dutch Albums (Album Top 100)	25
German Albums (Offizielle Top 100)	5
UK Albums (OCC)	17

== Certifications and sales ==
Region	Certification	Certified units/sales
Australia (ARIA)	Platinum	50,000^{^}
Finland (Musiikkituottajat)	Gold	25,000
France	—	100,000
Germany (BVMI)	Platinum	500,000^{^}
Hong Kong (IFPI Hong Kong)	Gold	10,000^{*}
Netherlands (NVPI)	Platinum	100,000^{^}
United Kingdom (BPI)	Platinum	1,000,000
United States (RIAA)	Gold	500,000^{^}
Summaries
Worldwide	—	2,000,000
^{*} Sales figures based on certification alone.^{^} Shipments figures based on certification alone.
