= Voulez-Vous =

1979 studio album by ABBA

Studio album by ABBA
- Released: 23 April 1979
- Recorded: 13 March 1978 – 29 March 1979
- Studios: Polar, Stockholm; Criteria, Miami
- Genres: Europop; Euro-disco
- Length: 41:43
- Labels: Polar; Epic (UK); Atlantic (US original release)
- Producers: Benny Andersson; Björn Ulvaeus

ABBA chronology
ABBA: The Album (1977)	Voulez-Vous (1979)	Greatest Hits Vol. 2 (1979)

Singles from Voulez-Vous
- 1. "Chiquitita" Released: 16 January 1979; 2. "Does Your Mother Know" Released: 27 April 1979; 3. "Voulez-Vous" / "Angeleyes" Released: 6 July 1979; 4. "As Good as New" Released: October 1979 (Mex.); 5. "I Have a Dream" Released: 7 December 1979

Voulez-Vous (pronounced [vule vu]; French for "Do you want (to)?") is the sixth studio album by the Swedish pop group ABBA. Released on 23 April 1979, the album yielded five hits, all of them big 1979 singles in Britain – "Chiquitita", "Does Your Mother Know", "I Have a Dream" and the double A-side "Voulez-Vous"/"Angeleyes".

The title track showed the group embracing disco music, which at the time was at its peak. The album topped the charts in a number of countries and ranked among Britain's five best-selling albums of the year.

It was the first ABBA album to be mainly recorded at Polar Studios in Stockholm, and the only ABBA album to include a studio recording made outside Sweden: the instrumental backing track for the title track was partly recorded at Criteria Studios in Miami.

Voulez-Vous was first released on CD in 1984. The album has been digitally remastered and reissued four times: first in 1997, then in 2001 and in 2005 as part of The Complete Studio Recordings box set, and yet again in 2010 for the Voulez-Vous Deluxe Edition.

== Background and production ==
In early 1978, ABBA were at the peak of their success and having just completed promotion for their latest album and theatrical film release, thoughts were turned to the next album, which was planned to be released in time for Christmas. Sessions however proved to be difficult and after starting on 13 March 1978 with the ultimately unreleased track "Dr Claus von Hamlet", a number of compositions were demoed and rejected. Indeed, after six months, only two songs that would end up on the finished album ("The King Has Lost His Crown" and "Lovers (Live a Little Longer)") were completed.

During this time the group opened their own recording studio, Polar Studios in Stockholm, which was among the most advanced in the world at the time and would be where ABBA would work from here on. Two songs recorded at this time were "Lovelight" and "Dream World". However, neither song would appear on the Voulez-Vous album ("Lovelight" would be used as the B-side to the single "Chiquitita", while "Dream World" would remain unreleased until 1994; both songs are now featured as bonus tracks on re-issues of the Voulez-Vous album). Other tracks started but subsequently scrapped included "Just a Notion", which was later included on Voyage (2021).

By September 1978, ABBA had been absent from the charts for some months, and so a song from the recording sessions, "Summer Night City", was released as a single. Never happy with the finished song, members Benny Andersson and Björn Ulvaeus regretted the release and lamented the fact that it peaked lower than previous singles in the charts, not being released at all in the US. They considered the UK to be their most important market, and there it had ended a run of number one hits by stalling at number five – their smallest hit for three years. A full-length version was planned for the upcoming album, but ultimately never used. By this time, tensions were growing within the group due to the low productivity of the period, as member Agnetha Fältskog commented, "I can tell from the look in Björn's eyes when he gets home how the day's work has been. Many times the boys have been working for ten hours without coming up with one single note". Andersson talked to a reporter at the time saying; "The prospects are not good. It’s worse than ever...We have no idea when we’ll be finished". It became obvious that the album wouldn't be completed by the end of the year and the deadline was extended into 1979. In late 1978, further indication of internal struggles became widely known when it was announced that married couple Ulvaeus and Fältskog were to divorce. Rather than spelling the end for the group, however, this freed up a lot of the tensions between the two and in late 1978, work suddenly took off apace for the album.

In October, two tracks were completed: "Angeleyes" and "If It Wasn't for the Nights". Although seen as an archetype ABBA track, the former of these was deemed dated by Andersson, labelling it "back to the sixties". The second track however featured an all-out contemporary vibe, being quite disco-orientated and considered the strongest song that had been recorded for the album. It was intended to be not only the next single but also the song that ABBA would perform at the Music for UNICEF Concert in January 1979. This plan was changed however when an even-better song came along in December. With the original title of "In the Arms of Rosalita", "Chiquitita" was the song the band performed. Although rather more schlager in style, Andersson considered it the best of their new songs, despite the feeling that it was very out of style with the rest of the acts performing that night. "It was pretty strange, but we felt it was the best song we had and that's why we chose it, however wrong it may have been", he said. In early 1979, "Chiquitita" became one of ABBA's biggest hits around the world, peaking at the top spot in many countries, although just being clipped by Blondie's "Heart of Glass" in the UK at number two.

At the end of January, Andersson and Ulvaeus left Sweden and rented an apartment in the Bahamas where they felt they could get some inspiration by listening to American music and experiencing a whole different vibe to the rather conservative Stockholm. Two songs emerged from this time; "Voulez-Vous" and "Kisses of Fire". Excited by the former, they went to Criteria Studios in Miami to record the backing track with the disco band Foxy — the only time they recorded a song outside Sweden. Upon returning to Sweden to finish the songs, another track, "Does Your Mother Know", was recorded – a song that was to be the next single, and also the only mainstream release to feature Ulvaeus on lead vocals. The single would not become as big a hit worldwide as "Chiquitita", but was the most successful release from the album in the US.

By the end of March, the final two tracks were finished; "As Good as New" and "I Have a Dream" (the latter featuring a local children's choir from the International School of Stockholm).

== Release ==
At the end of April the album, titled Voulez-Vous, was finally ready for release and to emphasize the shift towards a disco sound, the album cover shot was taken at Alexandra's nightclub in Stockholm. The album was released on 23 April 1979, and in the following months of its launch, ABBA released a number of other singles from it. The title track was released as a double A-side with "Angeleyes", while "I Have a Dream" was belatedly released in December 1979 following their recent world tour. A track recorded in August 1979 (four months after the release of the album), "Gimme! Gimme! Gimme! (A Man After Midnight)", was released as a single in October and was later included as a bonus track on CD versions of Voulez-Vous.

On 31 May 2010, the deluxe edition of Voulez-Vous was released internationally. It featured a remastered and expanded CD version of the album, with six bonus tracks, along with a companion DVD of TV content from 1978 and 1979. Found on this second disc were: the BBC TV special ABBA in Switzerland; the "Chiquitita" performance from the Music for UNICEF Concert and another one from ABBA Snowtime; a performance of "If It Wasn't for the Nights" from the Mike Yarwood Christmas Show (1978); a Björn and Benny interview on the Multi-Coloured Swap Shop; an extended promo of "I Have a Dream"; two Greatest Hits Vol. 2 TV commercials; and the "International Sleeve Gallery". The reissue also contained a 28-page illustrated booklet with an essay on the making of the album.

The album was reissued for its 40th anniversary on 14 June 2019, as a multi-format release. It included: a double-LP half-speed master of the original album, pressed on 180 g vinyl, cut at 45 rpm, and mastered at Abbey Road Studios; a colored-vinyl 7" box set of seven singles issued during the Voulez-Vous era; and stand-alone picture discs of each of these singles.

== Critical reception ==
Professional ratings
Review scores
Source	Rating
AllMusic	3.5/5 stars
Blender	5/5 stars
The Encyclopedia of Popular Music	3/5 stars
Ondarock	6/10
Record Mirror	4/5 stars
The Rolling Stone Album Guide	3/5 stars
Smash Hits	6/10
Spin Alternative Record Guide	8/10
Uncut	4/5 stars

The album received favourable reviews from contemporary music critics.

The Dutch magazine Hitkrant made it "LP of the Week" and stated: "This time, the Swedish foursome has delivered an album that will be talked about for a long time to come, because it namely is of an unprecedented, enormous class."

The Manchester Evening News determined that "Frida vocalises with increased assurance, now making words count much more—in fact the lyrics are slowly coming out of their sometimes naivete".

Less positively, Smash Hits' reviewer Red Starr found that ABBA "don't disappoint but they don't exactly inspire either with this clean but clinical collection of European disco-orientated songs. They've still to make an album that conveys the magic and impact of their singles, and this isn't it".

Record Mirror mostly praised the album, saying that ABBA's music was "never powerful ... but perfectly crafted". It gave praise to "As Good as New", "Voulez-Vous" and "Angel Eyes" and singled out "If It Wasn't for the Nights" as not only the best song on the album but "the best song to hit vinyl so far this year. It's a ten star song on a four star album." On the negative side it criticised the lyrics and said "Chiquitita" was "nauseating", "Does Your Mother Know" was "less than special" and "I Have a Dream" was the worst song on the album.

Bruce Eder of AllMusic retrospectively noted that "about half of Voulez-Vous shows the heavy influence of the Bee Gees from their megahit disco era" but that it also "had a pair of soft, lyrical Europop-style ballads" which according to him sounds like "popular folk music during the mid-to-late '60s".

Sean Egan from the BBC gave the album a favourable review writing that the album "was an effort that saw Agnetha, Benny, Björn and Anni-Frid put their dancing shoes on to join in with the dominant disco craze" and also that the album's ballads "are able to provide a pocket of air on a disco floor that would otherwise get sweaty and stultifying".

== Commercial performance ==
Voulez-Vous topped the charts in Belgium, Germany, the Netherlands, Sweden, Norway and Finland. In the UK, it peaked at number one for a whole month, and was a Top 10 success in countries including Canada, New Zealand and Australia. In the US, Voulez-Vous became ABBA's third album to reach the top 20 (peaking at number 19). It reached number 1 in Japan in 1979.

In July 2026, the Official Charts Company ranked Voulez-Vous third on its list of the most-streamed albums released in the 1970s, based on total UK streams.

== Track listing ==
All tracks are written by Benny Andersson and Björn Ulvaeus.

Side one
No.	Title	Length
1.	"As Good as New"	3:22
2.	"Voulez-Vous"	5:11
3.	"I Have a Dream"	4:44
4.	"Angeleyes"	4:20
5.	"The King Has Lost His Crown"	3:30

Side two
No.	Title	Length
1.	"Does Your Mother Know"	3:13
2.	"If It Wasn't for the Nights"	5:13
3.	"Chiquitita"	5:26
4.	"Lovers (Live a Little Longer)"	3:28
5.	"Kisses of Fire"	3:16
Total length:		41:43

Notes

- The Spanish pressing of the album features the Spanish version of "Chiquitita" on Side one, as its sixth track.

The 2001 reissue includes three bonus tracks: "Summer Night City", "Lovelight" and "Gimme! Gimme! Gimme! (A Man After Midnight)".

=== Deluxe edition ===
Released on May 31, 2010. "Estoy Soñando" and "¡Dame! ¡Dame! ¡Dame!" (the Spanish versions of "I Have a Dream" and "Gimme! Gimme! Gimme! (A Man After Midnight)", respectively), along with the Spanish version of "Chiquitita", were not included on this reissue, but could be found on Gracias Por La Música and as bonus tracks on The Complete Studio Recordings.

All tracks are written by Benny Andersson and Björn Ulvaeus.

Bonus tracks
No.	Title	Length
1.	"Summer Night City" (full-length version)	4:18
2.	"Lovelight" (B-side of "Chiquitita")	3:48
3.	"Gimme! Gimme! Gimme! (A Man After Midnight)"	4:53
4.	"Dream World" (first released on Thank You for the Music)	3:38
5.	"Voulez-Vous" (extended remix, 1979 US promo)	6:11

== Personnel ==
Adapted from the album's liner notes.

ABBA

- Agnetha Fältskog – lead vocals (1, 8, 10), co-lead vocals (2, 4, 7, 10), backing vocals
- Anni-Frid Lyngstad – lead vocals (3, 5, 9), co-lead vocals (2, 4, 7, 10), backing vocals
- Björn Ulvaeus – guitars (2–5, 7–10), banjo (8), lead vocals (6), backing vocals
- Benny Andersson – keyboards (1, 4–10), synthesizers (1–10), backing vocals

Additional musicians

- Ola Brunkert – drums (1, 3, 4, 6–10)
- Rutger Gunnarsson – bass guitar (1, 3, 5, 8–10)
- Janne Schaffer – guitars (1–4, 7)
- Joe Galdo – drums (2)
- Arnold Paseiro – bass guitar (2)
- Paul Harris – piano (2)
- Ish Ledesma; George Terry – guitars (2)
- Halldor Pálsson; Johan Stengård – tenor saxophones (2)
- Nils Landgren – trombone (2)
- International School of Stockholm Choir – vocals (3)
- Kerstin Feist – choir director (3)
- Mike Watson – bass guitar (4, 6, 7)
- Lasse Wellander – guitars (5, 6, 8–10)
- Rolf Alex – drums (5)
- Jan Risberg – oboe (5)
- Lars O. Carlsson; Kajtek Wojciechowski – tenor saxophones (6)
- Malando Gassama – percussion (7, 9)
- Thomas Sundkvist – viola (4, 7)

Production

- Benny Andersson; Björn Ulvaeus – producers, arrangers
- Michael B. Tretow – engineer
- Rutger Gunnarsson – string arrangements (1, 9)
- Anders Eljas – string arrangements (4, 5, 7), horn arrangements (7)
- Rune Söderqvist – album design
- Ola Lager – photography (at Alexandra Disco, Stockholm)

== Charts ==
=== Weekly charts ===
Initial weekly chart performance for Voulez-Vous
Chart (1979–1980)	Peak position
Argentine Albums (CAPIF)	2
Australian Albums (Kent Music Report)	5
Austrian Albums (Ö3 Austria)	2
Belgian Albums (Billboard Benelux)	1
Canada Top Albums/CDs (RPM)	6
Dutch Albums (Album Top 100)	1
Finnish Albums (Suomen virallinen lista)	1
French Albums (IFOP)	13
German Albums (Offizielle Top 100)	1
Japanese Albums (Oricon)	1
New Zealand Albums (RMNZ)	2
Norwegian Albums (VG-lista)	1
Swedish Albums (Sverigetopplistan)	1
UK Albums (Official Charts)	1
US Billboard 200	19
US Top 100 Albums (Cash Box)	26
US The Album Chart (Record World)	18

Latter weekly chart performance for Voulez-Vous
Chart (2019–2024)	Peak position
Belgian Albums (Ultratop Flanders)	43
Belgian Albums (Ultratop Wallonia)	69
Dutch Albums (Album Top 100)	26
Finnish Albums (Suomen virallinen lista)	29
German Albums (Offizielle Top 100)	65
Greek Albums (IFPI Greece)	66
Lithuanian Albums (AGATA)	61
Norwegian Albums (VG-lista)	27
Portuguese Albums (AFP)	169
Scottish Albums (Official Charts)	29
Swedish Albums (Sverigetopplistan)	5
Swiss Albums (Schweizer Hitparade)	65
UK Albums (Official Charts)	58
UK Album Downloads (Official Charts)	64

=== Year-end charts ===
1976 year-end chart performance for Voulez-Vous
Chart (1979)	Position
Austria (Ö3 Austria Top 40)	7
Canada Top Albums/CDs (RPM)	18
Dutch Albums (Album Top 100)	2
France (IFOP)	40
German Albums (Offizielle Top 100)	11
Japan (Oricon)	5
New Zealand Albums (Recorded Music NZ)	23
UK Albums (OCC)	5

1980 year-end chart performance for Voulez-Vous
Chart (1980)	Position
Canada Top Albums/CDs (RPM)	37
Dutch Albums (Album Top 100)	26
German Albums (Offizielle Top 100)	74

2022 year-end chart performance for Voulez-Vous
Chart (2022)	Position
Belgian Albums (Ultratop Flanders)	187

2023 year-end chart performance for Voulez-Vous
Chart (2023)	Position
Belgian Albums (Ultratop Flanders)	154

2024 year-end chart performance for Voulez-Vous
Chart (2024)	Position
Belgian Albums (Ultratop Flanders)	152

=== Decade-end charts ===
1970s decade-end chart performance for Voulez-Vous
Chart (1970–1979)	Position
Japan (Oricon)	17

== Certifications and sales ==
Region	Certification	Certified units/sales
Argentina	—	200,000
Australia (ARIA)	2× Platinum	200,000
Belgium (BRMA)	Platinum	50,000^{‡}
Canada (Music Canada)	2× Platinum	200,000^{^}
Denmark (IFPI Danmark)	Platinum	20,000^{‡}
Finland (Musiikkituottajat)	Platinum	82,340
France	—	200,000
Germany (BVMI)	Platinum	500,000^{^}
Greece	—	50,000
Hong Kong (IFPI Hong Kong)	Gold	10,000^{*}
Hungary	—	75,000
Italy (FIMI)	Gold	25,000^{‡}
Japan (Oricon Charts)	—	623,000
Malaysia	—	10,000
Netherlands (NVPI)	Platinum	100,000^{^}
New Zealand (RMNZ)	Platinum	15,000^{^}
Spain (Promusicae)	Gold	50,000^{^}
Sweden	—	289,925
Taiwan	—	2,500
United Kingdom (BPI)	Platinum	1,000,000
United States (RIAA)	Gold	500,000^{^}
^{*} Sales figures based on certification alone.^{^} Shipments figures based on certification alone.^{‡} Sales+streaming figures based on certification alone.

== Release history ==
Region	Date	Edition(s)	Format(s)	Label(s)	Ref.
Scandinavia	23 April 1979	Standard	LP; cassette	Polar	
Japan	1 May 1979	Standard	LP; cassette	Discomate	
United Kingdom	4 May 1979	Standard	LP; picture disc; cassette; 8-track cartridge	Epic	
Netherlands	May 1979	Standard	LP; cassette	Polydor	
United States	June 1979	Standard	LP; cassette; 8-track cartridge; Reel-to-reel tape	Atlantic	
Canada	June 1979	Standard	LP; cassette; 8-track cartridge	Atlantic	
Japan	21 June 1984	Standard	CD	Discomate	
Japan	1 July 1986	Standard	LP; CD	Polydor	
United States	1995	Standard	CD	Polydor; Polar	
Europe	May 1997	Remastered	CD	Polydor; Polar	
Various	16 July 2001	Bonus Track Reissue	LP; CD	Polydor; Polar	
Various	31 May 2010	Deluxe	LP; DVD; CD	Polar; Universal	
Japan	21 July 2010	Deluxe	DVD; CD; SHM-CD	Polar; Universal Japan	
Various	4 April 2014	Digital	Digital download; streaming	Polar	
Various	14 June 2019	40th Anniversary Reissue	Half-speed LP	Polar	
Various	10 June 2022	Reissue	Picture disc	Polar	

== See also ==
- 1979 in music
- List of number-one albums in Norway
- List of number-one singles and albums in Sweden
- List of UK Albums Chart number ones of the 1970s
