= I Have a Dream (song) =

1979 single by ABBA

Single by ABBA

from the album Voulez-Vous
- B-side: "Take a Chance on Me"; (recorded live at Wembley)
- Released: 7 December 1979
- Recorded: March 1979
- Studio: Polar, Stockholm, Sweden
- Genre: Europop; schlager
- Length: 4:45
- Label: Polar Music
- Songwriters: Benny Andersson; Björn Ulvaeus
- Producers: Benny Andersson; Björn Ulvaeus

ABBA singles chronology
"As Good as New" (1979)	"I Have a Dream" (1979)	"The Winner Takes It All" (1980)

Alternative cover
- Spanish single cover for "Estoy Soñando"

Lyric video
- "I Have A Dream" on YouTube

"I Have a Dream" is a song by the Swedish pop group ABBA, recorded for their sixth studio album Voulez-Vous (1979). The song features lead vocals by Anni-Frid Lyngstad. A stark departure from the rest of Voulez-Vous, "I Have a Dream" is a schlager-influenced Europop ballad about hope and resilience. It is notable as one of only two studio recordings by ABBA to feature vocals from outside the group, with the Stockholm International School children's choir being featured in the final verse and chorus. "I Have a Dream" was released on 7 December 1979 as the fifth and final single from Voulez-Vous by Polar Music.

"I Have a Dream" proved a major chart success in Europe, reaching the top three in nearly every country in the region. In the United Kingdom, it peaked at number two on the UK singles chart, rewarding the group their 14th consecutive top ten hit there. The single also reached the top spot on the Canadian adult contemporary chart. In contrast, "I Have a Dream" proved a chart failure in Australia. A Spanish version of the single, "Estoy Soñando", was also recorded and released, topping the charts in Argentina and reaching the top ten in Spain.

The single is featured on ABBA Gold (1992), and was also included in both the Mamma Mia! play and the film of the same name. The song would later be covered by Irish boy group Westlife twenty years later, becoming the UK Christmas number one single of 1999.

The french version of the song is titled "Chanter la vie", with french lyrics provided by Claude Lemesle for the Greek singer Nana Mouskouri. The song debuted on the singer's 1983 album Quand on revient and was later released as a single, with the song "Carry Me On" on the B-side.

Croatian singer Tereza Kesovija has recorded the song in croatian, titled "Pronađi put", which debuted on her 1985 album of the same title. The croatian lyrics were provided to Kesovija by lyricist and composer Željko Sabol. Kesovija has since performed the song numerous times, and it has appeared on many of her compilation albums.

== Overview ==
"I Have a Dream" was written by Benny Andersson and Björn Ulvaeus circa March 1979 and was taken from the group's 1979 album, Voulez-Vous. Anni-Frid Lyngstad sang the lead vocals. The track was released as a single in December 1979 with a live version of "Take a Chance on Me" as the B-side.

The recording includes a final chorus by 28 children from Stockholm International School. The song was the only ABBA track to feature additional vocalists in addition to the members of ABBA, until "Little Things" in 2021, in which the choir participated again in the studio. Also notable is the extensive use of electric sitar (played by Janne Schaffer), an unusual instrument in their recordings.

In the UK, the single was issued in a lavish gatefold sleeve, intended as a souvenir for UK fans who had attended the Wembley concerts. The back cover featured a message from ABBA themselves regarding the Wembley concerts, together with their signatures. The front cover used the same live photo of ABBA as the worldwide release, but the layout and fonts were different. This was only Epic's second picture sleeve for an ABBA single.

As of September 2021, "I Have a Dream" is ABBA's 12th-biggest song in the UK, including both physical sales and digital streams.

The live version of "Take a Chance on Me" on the B-side was one of three mixes of the same recording to be issued. Released soon after the concerts, this version is thought to be the genuine recording. A very slightly extended version, featuring spoken introductions from the group, was used as the B-side in Australia. This extended version has been released internationally on the deluxe edition of ABBA: The Album. Finally, a third mix was included on ABBA Live issued in 1986.

The song is featured extensively in the Black Mirror episode Fifteen Million Merits where the character Selma Telse is propelled to superstardom after performing a rendition on the talent show "Hot Shots".

== Critical reception ==
Tony Jasper of Music Week praised the single for its "immaculate arrangement" and coined it as an "obvious" single choice when its parent album was released. Tim Jonze of The Guardian ranked "I Have a Dream" number 21 in the publication's ranking of all of the group's UK singles, describing it as a "simple, gospel-tinged song that borders on the saccharine yet still contains some subtle ABBA mastery thrown in."

== Personnel ==
- Anni-Frid Lyngstad – lead vocals, backing vocals
- Agnetha Fältskog – backing vocals
- Björn Ulvaeus – acoustic guitar, backing vocals
- Benny Andersson – keyboards & synthesizers, backing vocals

=== Additional musicians ===
- Janne Schaffer – electric sitar
- Rutger Gunnarsson – bass
- Ola Brunkert – drums
- Stockholm International School – choir vocals

== Track listings and formats ==
Standard 7-inch single

1. "I Have a Dream" – 4:44
2. "Take a Chance on Me" (Recorded Live at Wembley) – 4:25

Portuguese 7-inch single

1. "I Have a Dream" – 4:44
2. "As Good as New" – 3:24

Spanish 7-inch single

1. "Estoy Soñando" (Version Española) – 4:44
2. "As Good as New" – 3:22

Argentine 7-inch single

1. "Estoy Soñando" (en Castellano) – 4:44
2. "Does Your Mother Know" – 3:10

Mexican 7-inch single

1. "Estoy Soñando" – 4:44
2. "Rock Me" – 3:03

Brazilian 7-inch single

1. "I Have a Dream" – 4:44
2. "Voulez-Vous" – 5:08

== Charts ==
=== Weekly charts ===
Weekly chart performance for "I Have a Dream"
Chart (1979–80)	Peak position
Argentina (CAPIF)	1
Australia (Kent Music Report)	64
Austria (Ö3 Austria Top 40)	1
Belgium (Ultratop 50 Flanders)	1
Canada Adult Contemporary (RPM)	1
Chile (Radio Cooperativa)	5
Costa Rica (Record World)	1
European Singles (Europarade)	1
Ireland (IRMA)	2
Israel (IBA)	2
Netherlands (Dutch Top 40)	1
Netherlands (Single Top 100)	1
Portugal (Musica & Som)	8
South Africa (Springbok)	3
Spain (AFYVE)	9
Switzerland (Schweizer Hitparade)	1
UK Singles (Official Charts)	2

=== Year-end charts ===
Year-end chart performance for "I Have a Dream"
Chart (1980)	Position
Austria (Ö3 Austria Top 40)	3
Belgium (Ultratop Flanders)	17
Netherlands (Dutch Top 40)	33
Netherlands (Single Top 100)	23
Switzerland (Schweizer Hitparade)	15

== Certifications ==
Region	Certification	Certified units/sales
Netherlands (NVPI)	Gold	100,000^{^}
New Zealand (RMNZ)	Gold	15,000^{‡}
United Kingdom (BPI)	Gold	500,000^{^}
^{^} Shipments figures based on certification alone.^{‡} Sales+streaming figures based on certification alone.

== Cristy Lane version ==
"I Have a Dream"

Single by Cristy Lane

from the album I Have a Dream
- B-side: "Rio Grande"
- Released: December 1980
- Recorded: October 1980
- Studio: LSI Studio
- Genre: Country; country pop
- Length: 3:52
- Label: Liberty; LS
- Songwriters: Benny Andersson; Björn Ulvaeus
- Producers: Jerry Gillespie; Don Grierson

Cristy Lane singles chronology
"Sweet Sexy Eyes" (1980)	"I Have a Dream" (1980)	"Love to Love You" (1981)

American country and Christian artist Cristy Lane notably covered "I Have a Dream" in 1980. Lane had several years of commercial success in the country music market with songs like "Let Me Down Easy", "Penny Arcade" and "Simple Little Words". In 1980, she recorded the religious-themed "One Day at a Time", which became a number one hit and brought Lane to the attention of Christian music listeners. With a similar theme, Lane recorded "I Have a Dream" in October 1980, shortly after the success of "One Day at a Time". The track was cut at LSI Studios and was produced by Jerry Gillespie, with assistance from executive producer Don Grierson. In the same recording session, the songs "Rio Grande" and "You Make It Easy" were also cut.

Lane's cover was released as a single in December 1980 via Liberty Records and LS Records. It was backed by the B-side, "Rio Grande", and was released as a 7" vinyl record. "I Have a Dream" spent multiple weeks on the Billboard Hot Country Songs chart between December 1980 and early 1981 before peaking at number 17. It was Lane's final top 20 hit single on the chart in her music career. It also became her second single to chart in New Zealand, where it reached number 34 in 1981. The song was later released on her 1981 studio album of the same name. The album included the original single's B-side as well. Lane's cover received a positive review from Billboard magazine in their December 1980 issue. Reviewers described the track as having "a rich south of the border undercurrent" while praising its production, calling it "crystalline."

=== Track listing ===
7" vinyl single

- "I Have a Dream" – 3:52
- "Rio Grande" – 3:05

=== Charts ===
Chart (1980–81)	Peak position
New Zealand (Recorded Music NZ)	34
US Hot Country Singles (Billboard)	17

== Westlife version ==
"I Have a Dream"

Single by Westlife

from the album Coast to Coast and ABBAmania
- A-side: "Seasons in the Sun"; (double A-side); "Flying Without Wings"; (triple A-side, Australia)
- Released: 13 December 1999
- Studio: PWL Studios (London)
- Length: 4:06
- Label: RCA; BMG
- Songwriters: Benny Andersson; Björn Ulvaeus
- Producers: Dan Frampton; Pete Waterman; Trevor Steel; John Holiday

Westlife singles chronology
"Flying Without Wings" (1999)	"I Have a Dream" / "Seasons in the Sun" (1999)	"Fool Again" (2000)

Music video
- "I Have a Dream" on YouTube

Irish boy band Westlife released a cover of "I Have a Dream" in December 1999, 20 years after ABBA's original release. The song became the group's fourth UK number-one single. The release was a double A-side with "Seasons in the Sun" in the UK and Ireland and "Flying Without Wings" in the Netherlands, and a triple A-side in Australia with both "Seasons in the Sun" and "Flying Without Wings" included. The release became the UK's Christmas number-one single of 1999, beating Cliff Richard's charity single "The Millennium Prayer" into the No. 2 spot. Westlife's remix version of "I Have a Dream" was later included on their second studio album Coast to Coast in 2000. It then extended its peak into January 2000, spending a total of 17 weeks on the UK chart. The song was the 26th best-selling single of 1999 in the UK and it was also the final number one single of the 1990s.

In 2001, as part of a UNICEF fund-raising campaign, the song was re-recorded with additional vocals by Indonesian child singer, Sinna Sherina Munaf. The song has received a platinum sales certification in the UK for over 707,000 copies (as of 30 November 2021) sold across physical, digital, and streaming equivalent sales. It is the band's second-best-selling single for both paid-for and combined sales.

As of 9 December 2021, Music Week updated the single's UK total sales to 706,792 for I Have a Dream alone with its physical sales before and digital releases recently, higher than the 500,000 total UK sales of the original ABBA release. "Seasons in the Sun" have 100,273 sales from streaming as a standalone track.

=== Music video ===
The music video for the Westlife version of "I Have a Dream" features the band exiting out of a car and into a dark street where a group of children are. The children start singing with the band members and play with toys lying nearby before the band head back to the car and drive away.

=== Track listings ===
- United Kingdom. Ireland
1. "I Have a Dream" (single remix) – 4:06
2. "Seasons in the Sun" (single remix) – 4:10
3. "On the Wings of Love" – 3:22
- Australia
1. "Flying Without Wings" – 3:35
2. "I Have a Dream" (remix) – 4:06
3. "Seasons in the Sun" (single remix) – 4:10
4. "Flying Without Wings" (video) – 3:40
- Netherlands
1. "Flying Without Wings" – 3:35
2. "I Have a Dream" (remix) – 4:06

=== Charts ===
==== Weekly charts ====
Chart (1999–2000)	Peak position
Europe (Eurochart Hot 100)	7
Finland (Suomen virallinen lista)	10
Germany (GfK)	24
Hungary (Rádiós Top 40)	11
Iceland (Íslenski Listinn Topp 40)	13
Ireland (IRMA) with "Seasons in the Sun"	1
Netherlands (Dutch Top 40) with "Flying Without Wings"	19
New Zealand (Recorded Music NZ)	10
Norway (VG-lista)	10
Scottish Singles Sales (Official Charts) with "Seasons in the Sun"	1
Sweden (Sverigetopplistan)	15
Switzerland (Schweizer Hitparade)	18
UK Singles (Official Charts) with "Seasons in the Sun"	1
UK Airplay (Music Week)	7

==== Year-end charts ====
Chart (1999)	Position
UK Singles (OCC)	26

Chart (2000)	Position
Europe (Eurochart Hot 100)	71
Ireland (IRMA)	45
UK Singles (OCC)	106

=== Certifications ===
Region	Certification	Certified units/sales
New Zealand (RMNZ)	Gold	5,000^{*}
United Kingdom (BPI)	Platinum	600,000^{^}
^{*} Sales figures based on certification alone.^{^} Shipments figures based on certification alone.
