= Lovers (Live a Little Longer) =

Song by ABBA

from the album Voulez-Vous
- Released: 23 April 1979
- Recorded: 13 March 1978 – 29 March 1979
- Studio: Polar Music
- Genre: Disco
- Length: 3:28
- Label: Polar; Epic (UK); Atlantic (US original release)
- Songwriters: Benny Andersson; Björn Ulvaeus
- Producers: Benny Andersson; Björn Ulvaeus

Audio video
- "Lovers (Live A Little Longer)" on YouTube

"Lovers (Live a Little Longer)" is a song by ABBA, released on their 1979 album Voulez-Vous.

== Production ==
The song premiered in the TV show ABBA in Switzerland in February 1979.

== Synopsis ==
The song argues that a recent scientific study has shown that love is a factor in longevity. It then uses this to say "lovers live a little longer baby, you and me we got a chance to live twice".

== Composition ==
The song contains "electric guitars and restless strings", which blend together to simulate the "dynamite drug" spoken of in the narrative. The song consists of a "vocal baton-changing" between Frida and Agnetha in the lead up to the chorus. The rhythm track of the song is very similar to that of "Eagle". The string arrangement is by Rutger Gunnarsson.

== Critical reception ==
In his book Abba – Uncensored on the Record, John Tobler describes the song as "fairly frantic, but also fairly sexy". He adds that the song illustrates Frida's "thespian and theatrical inclinations". In an article by The Daily Telegraph about ABBA's "hidden gems", it offers the song's "slow, sexy, understated grooves with sweeping strings" as an alternative to The Name of the Game. The Sydney Morning Herald said it was a "steamy, even sensual number". Times Online listed "Lovers (Live a Little Longer)" and "Kisses of Fire" as "shoulda-been hits" that were passed over in favour of other lesser songs. ABBA: Let The Music Speak describes the song as "alternative and risqué". Internet reviewer Michael Lawrence gave the song a C+. ABBA the Blog said: "On "Lovers (Live A Little Longer)" and "Kisses of Fire," ABBA created an adult image of themselves by singing about sex". Internet reviewer George Starostin says of Voulez Vous: "There's also quite a bit of generic filler that shows far less concern for melody than usual, with three songs in a row built on simplistic rhythms, containing no hooks and simply being way too formulaic for ABBA: 'If It Wasn't For The Nights', 'Lovers Live A Little Longer', and 'Kisses of Fire' could have been written by just about any disco-abusing band at the time, Boney M included." Culture Fusion Reviews said ""Lovers (Live a Little Longer)" ... stands as the most complex song on the album. It has a slight disco feel but it moves through so many tempo, time signature and melody changes that it becomes a weirdo highlight of the album." BBC reviewer Sean Egan said "Lovers (Live a Little Longer), a would-be saucy anthem which is merely shrill", is one of the few "clinkers" of the album.
