= Does Your Mother Know =

Single by ABBA

from the album Voulez-Vous
- B-side: "Kisses of Fire"
- Released: 27 April 1979
- Recorded: February–March 1979
- Studio: Polar, Stockholm, Sweden
- Genre: Europop; pop rock; dance-rock; glam rock
- Length: 3:15
- Label: Polar (Sweden); Epic (UK); Atlantic (No. America)
- Songwriters: Benny Andersson; Björn Ulvaeus
- Producers: Benny Andersson; Björn Ulvaeus

ABBA singles chronology
"Chiquitita" (1979)	"Does Your Mother Know" (1979)	"Voulez-Vous" (1979)

Music video
- "Does Your Mother Know" on YouTube

"Does Your Mother Know" is a song by Swedish pop music group ABBA, recorded for their sixth studio album Voulez-Vous (1979). In most countries it was the second single release from the album, but in North America was the lead single instead of "Chiquitita". The track is ABBA's only major single, and one of their few songs, to feature Björn Ulvaeus as lead vocalist rather than Agnetha Fältskog or Anni-Frid Lyngstad (who both provided backing vocals). The single's B-side was "Kisses of Fire". For the writing, Ulvaeus was inspired by a young fan he met and, because of her age, turned away.

A success for the group, "Does Your Mother Know" reached number one on the music charts in Belgium, and reached the top ten in eight other countries. Its North American chart performance was moderate, reaching numbers 12 and 19 on the Canadian RPM Top Singles and US Billboard Hot 100 charts. Ulvaeus later said that the track would have been a bigger hit if Fältskog or Lyngstad sang the lead vocals instead. In 2019, the single was re-released as a vinyl picture disc.

== Composition and recording ==
With lyrics described by ABBA biographer Carl Magnus Palm as "a daring tribute to cross-generational flirting in big city night clubs", the track was recorded in February–March 1979 (initially under the working title "I Can Do It") and released as a single in April of that year. The distinctive guitar riff was taken from the recording of an unfinished song in August 1975. The middle section ("Take it easy...") was adapted from a track called "Dream World," which was recorded in September–October 1978, but not released until it was included in the 1994 box set Thank You for the Music.

"Does Your Mother Know" was composed by Benny Anderson and Ulvaeus at the beginning of 1979 on a songwriting trip to the Bahamas, rather than on the Swedish island of Viggsö in the Stockholm Archipelago, where much of their music had previously been written. The inspiration for the lyrics came from a newspaper article, whilst the title was a phrase Ulvaeus had seen in a book or magazine. In a 2018 video interview with The Economist, Ulvaeus said that, in today's day and age, he would be more hesitant on writing the track in light of events like the MeToo movement. The demo featured his guide vocal and it was decided to keep this during the recording process. An early, rockier version of the song (with a longer introduction) was performed partially live for the BBC TV special, Abba in Switzerland, recorded in Leysin on 16 February and broadcast across Europe in April 1979. The instrumental introduction on the released version featured a sound Anderson had created on an expensive Yamaha GX-1 analogue synthesizer, somewhat similar in its operation to the Minimoog. The drumming style was influenced by Carmine Appice, whom Ola Brunkert had seen perform with Rod Stewart at a concert in Leicester, while ABBA were in the United Kingdom doing some TV promotional work.

== Critical reception ==
Critics were mostly favorable to the song. In a contemporary review, Billboard felt the song sounds like those from the musical Grease, saying that "the sweet, airy vocals contrast effectively with the rocking instrumentation." Cash Box said that it is a "rocking departure for the group, although the overall sound is still Europop." Record World said that "this buoyant pop-rocker is destined to become a classic." Cliff White from Smash Hits wrote a favorable review saying, "When it comes to pure, no-nonsense pop music performed with flair and no hint of condescension, Abba generally pull it off better than most. This time [...] they've excelled themselves with a lively rocker that I'll be happy to hear on my tranny any time over the next couple of months." Record Business said that it is "packed with inventive ideas that register with each further spin." However, the Los Angeles Times was less liking of the song, with reviewer Robert Hilburn referring disparagingly to the song (and ABBA's output in general) as "cream puff" music. (Note: Hilburn used the term "cream puff" as opposed to "bubble gum", as he felt the latter was associated too much with the 1960s.) Paul Morley of New Musical Express also disparaged the single, describing it as "nimble Swedish R&B". James Parade and Monique of Record Mirror wrote that "For a change Bjorny sings but Abbs seem to be flagging aesthetically at the moment." Retrospectively, AllMusic reviewer Donald A. Guarisco said of the song that "ABBA's recording balances the song's rock elements with dance music touches to create an intriguing dance/rock hybrid" and that its "macho feel is enhanced by a rockabilly-styled melody that flowers into a swinging chorus".

Some critics have rated "Does Your Mother Know" as one of ABBA's best songs. In 2018, Rob Sheffield ranked "Does Your Mother Know" 11th in a list of ABBA's top 25 songs published by Rolling Stone. In 2021, Total Guitar rated it the group's fourth best guitar song, after "Waterloo", "Gimme! Gimme! Gimme! (A Man After Midnight)" and "SOS". It was placed 18th in a 2024 BBC Radio 2 poll to find listeners' favourite ABBA song.

== Commercial reception ==
"Does Your Mother Know" was another sizeable ABBA hit, hitting No. 1 in Belgium and reaching the top 5 in Great Britain, Ireland, the Netherlands and Finland. It was also a top 10 hit in Australia, Canada, West Germany, Rhodesia and Switzerland. As of September 2021, it is ABBA's 14th-biggest song in the UK, including both pure sales and digital streams.

== Music video ==
The video for the song was shot by Lasse Hallström, and like that for "Voulez-Vous", featured ABBA performing to a dancing audience as if in a discotheque.

== Usage in media ==
The song featured prominently in the 2003 film Johnny English, starring Rowan Atkinson. "Does Your Mother Know" is featured in the jukebox musical Mamma Mia! and its 2008 film adaptation. In this version the gender roles were reversed, so that the lead vocal involved an older woman singing about a younger male's attempt to seduce her. American rock group R.E.M. covered the original song live, whilst British band Oasis used a variant of the opening guitar riff on their 2002 track "The Hindu Times".

== Personnel ==
Taken from the Voulez-Vous album.

- Björn Ulvaeus – lead vocals
- Agnetha Fältskog and Anni-Frid Lyngstad – backing vocals
- Lasse Wellander – guitar
- Mike Watson – bass guitar
- Lars O. Carlsson and Kajtek Wojciecjowski – tenor saxophones
- Benny Andersson – keyboards, synthesizers and backing vocals
- Ola Brunkert – drums

== Charts ==
=== Weekly charts ===
Weekly chart performance for "Does Your Mother Know"
Chart (1979)	Peak position
Australia (Kent Music Report)	7
Austria (Ö3 Austria Top 40)	13
Belgium (Ultratop 50 Flanders)	1
Canada (CRIA)	8
Canada Top Singles (RPM)	12
Canada Adult Contemporary (RPM)	2
Ecuador (Radio Vision)	7
Europe (Eurochart Hot 100 Singles)	1
Finland (Suomen virallinen lista)	2
France (IFOP)	16
Ireland (IRMA)	3
Japan Top 100 Singles Chart (Oricon)	18
Mexico (Mexican Singles Chart)	17
Netherlands (Dutch Top 40)	4
Netherlands (Single Top 100)	3
New Zealand (Recorded Music NZ)	27
Rhodesia (Rhodesian Singles Chart)	9
South Africa (Springbok Radio)	12
Switzerland (Schweizer Hitparade)	6
UK Singles (Official Charts)	4
US Billboard Hot 100	19
US Adult Contemporary (Billboard)	40
US Cash Box Top 100 Singles	16
US National Airplay (Radio & Records)	18
US Singles (Record World)	17
West Germany (GfK)	10

=== Year-end charts ===
Annual chart rankings for "Does Your Mother Know"
Chart (1979)	Position
Australia (Kent Music Report)	70
Belgium (Ultratop Flanders)	20
Canada Top Singles (RPM)	52
Netherlands (Dutch Top 40)	67
Netherlands (Single Top 100)	30
UK Singles (OCC)	43
US	132

== Certifications and sales ==
=== ABBA version ===
Region	Certification	Certified units/sales
Denmark (IFPI Danmark)	Gold	45,000^{‡}
France	—	80,000
New Zealand (RMNZ)	Platinum	30,000^{‡}
United Kingdom (BPI)	Platinum	600,000^{‡}
^{‡} Sales+streaming figures based on certification alone.

=== Mamma Mia! version ===
Region	Certification	Certified units/sales
United Kingdom (BPI)	Silver	200,000^{‡}
^{‡} Sales+streaming figures based on certification alone.
