= Gimme! Gimme! Gimme! (A Man After Midnight) =

1979 song by ABBA

Single by ABBA

from the album Greatest Hits Vol. 2
- B-side: "The King Has Lost His Crown"
- Released: 12 October 1979
- Recorded: August 1979
- Genre: Disco; Eurodisco
- Length: 4:45 (album version); 3:35 (single edit); 3:22 (music video)
- Label: Polar Music
- Songwriters: Benny Andersson; Björn Ulvaeus
- Producers: Benny Andersson; Björn Ulvaeus

ABBA singles chronology
"Angeleyes" (1979)	"Gimme! Gimme! Gimme! (A Man After Midnight)" (1979)	"As Good as New" (1979)

Music video
- "Gimme! Gimme! Gimme! (A Man After Midnight)" on YouTube

¡Dame! ¡Dame! ¡Dame!
- Spanish-language version single

"Gimme! Gimme! Gimme! (A Man After Midnight)" is a song by Swedish recording group ABBA. A disco and Eurodisco song, it was first recorded in August 1979 to promote the group's North American and European concert legs of ABBA: The Tour. It was released on 12 October 1979 as the sole single taken from their second greatest hits album Greatest Hits Vol. 2. Agnetha Fältskog sang the lead vocals to the song. Although it was not recorded for it, "Gimme! Gimme! Gimme! (A Man After Midnight)" was included in reissues of the group's sixth studio album Voulez-Vous.

The track went on to become one of ABBA's signature hits, topping the charts in Belgium, Denmark, Finland, Ireland, and Japan's international chart, and reached the top ten in multiple countries across Europe and Australia as well. Its release in the United States and Canada was cancelled by Atlantic Records even though promotional copies were already pressed, presumably due to the unpopularity of disco as a whole in the US following Disco Demolition Night.

== Background ==
"Gimme! Gimme! Gimme! (A Man After Midnight)" was written and composed by Benny Andersson and Björn Ulvaeus, with the lead vocal sung by Agnetha Fältskog. Fältskog, as the narrator, weaves the image of a lonely woman who longs for a romantic relationship and views her loneliness as a forbidding darkness of night, even drawing parallels to how the happy endings of movie stars are so different from her existence. The melody line of the song was played on an ARP Odyssey synthesizer.

Originally, ABBA had recorded another song, "Rubber Ball Man", which was planned as a single. It featured the typical "ABBA-arrangement" with both Fältskog and Anni-Frid Lyngstad on lead vocals and the use of classical strings. This song was also performed by the group during rehearsals for its 1979 tour as "Under My Sun". However, the group felt that "Gimme! Gimme! Gimme!", with its disco sound, would be a better choice, and thus, "Rubber Ball Man" remained nothing more than a demo.

The song came about after Benny and Björn heard Donna Summer's hit "Hot Stuff", and upon hearing it, it inspired the riffs, melody and sentiment of the song with Agnetha yearning for 'a man after midnight' whilst Donna was in need of some 'hot stuff'.

=== Single version ===
The single version of this song, which was released in its full length of 4:45 everywhere else in the world, was released in the United States and Canada in an edited format, being just 3:36 in length. This was done by removing the first half of the opening instrumental, the first four of the eight bars of the instrumental bridge between the second and final chorus, and fading the song out early. It is believed the edit was done by Atlantic, ABBA's North American record label and not Polar, hence the reason why it was available only in the US and Canada. This single version has never appeared on any commercial CD issued by Polar/Universal to date and along with the US promo edit of "Chiquitita", it marked the only time Atlantic ever commercially released an edited version of an ABBA single while they had the North American rights to release ABBA recordings.

As of September 2021, it is ABBA's tenth-biggest song in the UK, including both pure sales and digital streams.

The single was never released by Polar Music in the group's native Sweden, instead being featured on the Greatest Hits Vol. 2 album, which did get a Swedish release. While Polar released the single in neighbouring Norway, Denmark, and Finland, copies of these versions were not made available in the Swedish record stores, who thus arranged to import copies of the United Kingdom version on Epic Records. Sales of these imports were sufficient for the single to reach no. 16 on the sales chart in Sweden.

On October 4, 2024, "Gimme! Gimme! Gimme!" was reissued digitally as a promotional single for the compilation album The Singles: The First Fifty Years. This release was accompanied by a Dolby Atmos remix of the song (the third ABBA release to receive this treatment, after "Waterloo" and Voyage) and a new 4K remaster of the music video.

On July 20, 2025, "Gimme! Gimme! Gimme!" surpassed 1 Billion streams on Spotify, becoming the second ABBA song to reach that milestone, following "Dancing Queen".

=== Spanish version ===
"¡Dame! ¡Dame! ¡Dame!" is the Spanish-language version of the song. The song was released as a single to promote Gracias Por La Música in Latin America and other Spanish-speaking countries.

== Reception ==
=== Critical ===
Cash Box called it "another exercise of sparkling euro-pop, with the slightest hint of boogie bottom to give the song an edge." Record World noted the track's "captivating chorus hook".

In 2018, Financial Times described the song as "a masterpiece of Scandinavian frankness" and Abba's "most sexually liberated song". The Financial Times also noted that the song had become a gay anthem.

=== Commercial ===
"Gimme! Gimme! Gimme! (A Man After Midnight)" was another highly successful song for ABBA. It reached no. 1 in Belgium, Finland, France, Ireland, and Switzerland, while reaching the top 3 in Austria, West Germany, the United Kingdom, the Netherlands, and Norway. It also proved to be ABBA's most successful song in Japan, reaching no. 17.

== Personnel ==
=== ABBA ===
- Agnetha Fältskog – lead and backing vocals
- Anni-Frid Lyngstad – backing vocals
- Bjorn Ulvaeus – electric guitar, backing vocals
- Benny Andersson – keyboards, synthesizer, backing vocals

=== Additional personnel ===
- Ola Brunkert – drums
- Rutger Gunnarsson – bass, string arrangement
- Lasse Wellander – guitar
- Åke Sundqvist – percussion
- Anders Dahl, Gunnar Mickols – violin
- Halldor Pálsson, Lars O. Carlsson – tenor saxophone
- Christer Danielsson – bass trombone

== Charts ==
=== Weekly charts ===
Chart (1979–1980)	Peak position
Australia (Kent Music Report)	8
Austria (Ö3 Austria Top 40)	2
Belgium (Ultratop 50 Flanders)	1
Denmark (IFPI)	1
Europe (Eurochart Hot 100)	1
Finland (Suomen virallinen lista)	1
France (SNEP)	2
Ireland (IRMA)	1
Japan (Oricon International Chart)	1
Japan (Oricon Singles Chart)	17
Netherlands (Dutch Top 40)	2
Netherlands (Single Top 100)	2
New Zealand (Recorded Music NZ)	15
Norway (VG-lista)	2
South Africa (Springbok Radio)	16
Sweden (Sverigetopplistan)	16
Switzerland (Schweizer Hitparade)	1
UK Singles (Official Charts)	3
West Germany (GfK)	3

2006 weekly chart performance for "Gimme! Gimme! Gimme! (A Man After Midnight)"
Chart (2006)	Peak position
CIS Airplay (TopHit)	143
Russia Airplay (TopHit)	146

Chart (2021)	Peak position
Sweden (Sverigetopplistan)	37

Chart (2022)	Peak position
Canada Digital Song Sales (Billboard)	46

Chart (2023)	Peak position
Sweden (Sverigetopplistan)	42

Chart (2024)	Peak position
Sweden (Sverigetopplistan)	55

Chart (2025)	Peak position
Sweden (Sverigetopplistan)	50

Chart (2026)	Peak position
Global Excl. US (Billboard)	187
Netherlands (Single Top 100)	65
Sweden (Sverigetopplistan)	26
Switzerland (Schweizer Hitparade Top 100)	42
Switzerland (Schweizer Hitparade Streaming Charts Top 100)	33

=== Year-end charts ===
Chart (1979)	Position
Belgium (Ultratop 50 Flanders)	32
France (IFOP)	10
Netherlands (Dutch Top 40)	42
Netherlands (Single Top 100)	57

Chart (1980)	Position
Germany (Official German Charts)	54

== Release history ==
Region	Date	Title	Label	Format	Catalog
UK, Ireland	12 Oct 1979	"Gimme! Gimme! Gimme! (A Man After Midnight)" / "The King Has Lost His Crown"	Epic	7-inch vinyl	S EPC 7914
Denmark, Norway	15 Oct 1979	"Gimme! Gimme! Gimme! (A Man After Midnight)" / "The King Has Lost His Crown"	Polar	7-inch vinyl	POS 1256
Netherlands, Germany, Austria, Portugal, Switzerland, India, Kenya	20 Oct 1979	"Gimme! Gimme! Gimme! (A Man After Midnight)" / "The King Has Lost His Crown"	Polydor	7-inch vinyl	2001 919
Australia, New Zealand	Oct 1979	"Gimme! Gimme! Gimme! (A Man After Midnight)" / "The King Has Lost His Crown"	RCA Victor	7-inch vinyl	103452
France	Oct 1979	"Gimme! Gimme! Gimme! (A Man After Midnight)" / "The King Has Lost His Crown"	Vogue	7-inch vinyl	101237
Japan	Oct 1979	"Gimme! Gimme! Gimme! (A Man After Midnight)" / "The King Has Lost His Crown"	Discomate	7-inch vinyl, promo	DSS-8
Japan	Oct 1979	"Gimme! Gimme! Gimme! (A Man After Midnight)" / "The King Has Lost His Crown"	Discomate	12-inch vinyl, promo	DSS-1005
Japan	25 Nov 1979	"Gimme! Gimme! Gimme! (A Man After Midnight)" / "The King Has Lost His Crown"	Discomate	7-inch vinyl	DSP-131
Spain	Nov 1979	"Gimme! Gimme! Gimme! (A Man After Midnight)" / "The King Has Lost His Crown"	Carnaby	7-inch vinyl	MO 1917
Greece	1979	"Gimme! Gimme! Gimme! (A Man After Midnight)" / "The King Has Lost His Crown"	Pan Vox	7-inch vinyl	PAN VOX 7605
South Africa	1979	"Gimme! Gimme! Gimme! (A Man After Midnight)" / "The King Has Lost His Crown"	Sunshine	7-inch vinyl	GBS 139
Italy	29 Feb 1980	"Gimme! Gimme! Gimme! (A Man After Midnight)" / "The King Has Lost His Crown"	Epic	7-inch vinyl	EPC 7914
Spain	Feb 1980	"Dame! Dame! Dame!" / "The King Has Lost His Crown"	Carnaby	7-inch vinyl	MO 1924
Turkey	1980	"Gimme! Gimme! Gimme! (A Man After Midnight)" / "The King Has Lost His Crown"	Balet	7-inch vinyl	BE 229
Yugoslavia	29 Jan 1980	"Gimme! Gimme! Gimme! (A Man After Midnight)" / "The King Has Lost His Crown"	Radio-Televizija Beograd	7-inch vinyl	1220012
US, Canada	Feb 1980	"Gimme! Gimme! Gimme! (A Man After Midnight)" (Short Version - 3.35) / "The King Has Lost His Crown"	Atlantic	7-inch vinyl	AT 3652
US	Feb 1980	"Gimme! Gimme! Gimme! (A Man After Midnight)" (Short Version - 3.35) / "Gimme! Gimme! Gimme! (A Man After Midnight)" (Long Version - 4.45)	Atlantic	7-inch vinyl, promo	3652
US	1980	"Dame! Dame! Dame!" / "Gracias Por La Musica"	Discos CBS International	7-inch vinyl	DAS 40003
Japan	Jul 1980	"Dame! Dame! Dame!" / "Gracias Por La Musica"	Discomate	7-inch vinyl, promo	DSS-9
Ecuador	14 Nov 1980	"Gimme! Gimme! Gimme! (A Man After Midnight)" / "The King Has Lost His Crown"	RCA	7-inch vinyl	ECK-200937
Brazil	1980	"Gimme! Gimme! Gimme! (A Man After Midnight)" / "The King Has Lost His Crown"	RCA	7-inch vinyl	101.8179
El Salvador	1980	"Gimme! Gimme! Gimme! (A Man After Midnight)" / "The King Has Lost His Crown"	RCA	7-inch vinyl	CA-10949
Peru	1980	“Dame! Dame! Dame! (Un Hombre Después De Medianoche)” / “Ojos De Angels”	RCA	7-inch vinyl	XRPBO 988
Colombia	1980	"Dame! Dame! Dame!" / "Gracias Por La Musica"	RCA	7-inch vinyl	05(3011)52201
Panama	1980	"Dame! Dame! Dame!" / "Gracias Por La Musica"	RCA	7-inch vinyl	XB-01157
Europe	14 Jun 2019	"Gimme! Gimme! Gimme! (A Man After Midnight)" / "The King Has Lost His Crown"	Polar	7-inch vinyl, picture disc	00602577237638
Worldwide	4 Oct 2024	"Gimme! Gimme! Gimme! (A Man After Midnight)"	Polar	Streaming	

== Certifications ==
Region	Certification	Certified units/sales
Denmark (IFPI Danmark)	Platinum	90,000^{‡}
France (SNEP)	Gold	500,000^{*}
Germany (BVMI)	Platinum	600,000^{‡}
Italy (FIMI) sales since 2009	Platinum	100,000^{‡}
Netherlands (NVPI)	Gold	100,000^{^}
New Zealand (RMNZ)	3× Platinum	90,000^{‡}
Portugal (AFP)	Gold	20,000^{‡}
Spain (Promusicae)	Platinum	60,000^{‡}
United Kingdom (BPI) digital, sales since 2004	2× Platinum	1,200,000^{‡}
United Kingdom (BPI) physical release, sales in 1979	Silver	250,000^{^}
^{*} Sales figures based on certification alone.^{^} Shipments figures based on certification alone.^{‡} Sales+streaming figures based on certification alone.

== A-Teens version ==
"Gimme! Gimme! Gimme! (A Man After Midnight)"

Single by A-Teens

from the album The ABBA Generation
- Released: 1999
- Length: 3:56
- Label: Universal
- Songwriters: Benny Andersson; Björn Ulvaeus
- Producers: Thomas Johansson; Ronald Malmberg

A-Teens singles chronology
"Super Trouper" (1999)	"Gimme! Gimme! Gimme! (A Man After Midnight)" (1999)	"Happy New Year" (1999)

Music video
- "Gimme! Gimme! Gimme! (A Man After Midnight)" on YouTube

"Gimme! Gimme! Gimme! (A Man After Midnight)" was A-Teens' third single (fourth in other territories) from their first album The ABBA Generation, a collection of ABBA cover versions. The song was remixed for its single release. The single became their third top-10 hit in Sweden, where it earned a gold certification. The song was also recorded in Spanish.

=== Music video ===
The music video was directed by Sebastian Reed and filmed in Sweden. The video uses the remixed radio version. The video starts with the boys entering a warehouse, where they find a crystal ball. Inside, there is an "alternate world" where they perform the song. Part of the video also features the band at a bowling alley where they play a few games against each other.

=== Releases ===
European 2-track CD single

1. "Gimme! Gimme! Gimme!" [Radio version] – 3:45
2. "A*Teens Medley" [Pierre J's Radio Mix] – 3:54

European maxi CD

1. "Gimme! Gimme! Gimme!" [Radio version] – 3:45
2. "Gimme! Gimme! Gimme!" [Extended version] – 6:02
3. "Gimme! Gimme! Gimme!" [Earthbound Late Show Remix] – 5:04
4. "A*Teens Medley" [Pierre J's Full Length Mix] – 8:19

Mexican CD single

1. "Gimme! Gimme! Gimme!" [Radio version] – 3:45
2. "¡Dame! ¡Dame! ¡Dame!" [Versión en español] – 3:43

Japanese maxi CD

1. "Gimme! Gimme! Gimme!" [Radio version] – 3:45
2. "A*Teens Medley" [Pierre J's Radio Mix] – 3:54
3. "Mamma Mia" [Versión en español] – 3:46
4. "¡Dame! ¡Dame! ¡Dame!" [Versión en español] – 3:43

=== Charts ===
==== Weekly charts ====
Chart (1999–2000)	Peak position
Belgium (Ultratip Bubbling Under Flanders)	4
Belgium (Ultratip Bubbling Under Wallonia)	19
Germany (GfK)	33
Netherlands (Dutch Top 40)	27
Netherlands (Single Top 100)	24
Sweden (Sverigetopplistan)	10
Switzerland (Schweizer Hitparade)	51

==== Year-end charts ====
Chart (1999)	Position
Sweden (Hitlistan)	76

=== Certifications ===
Region	Certification	Certified units/sales
Sweden (GLF)	Gold	15,000^{^}
^{^} Shipments figures based on certification alone.

== Film version ==
"Gimme! Gimme! Gimme! (A Man After Midnight)"

Single by Amanda Seyfried featuring Ashley Lilley and Rachel McDowall

from the album Mamma Mia! The Movie Soundtrack
- Released: 2008
- Length: 4:54 (full version); 3:53 (single/soundtrack version); 3:43 (video edit)
- Label: Decca; Polydor
- Songwriters: Benny Andersson; Björn Ulvaeus
- Producers: Benny Andersson; Björn Ulvaeus (executive)

Music video
- "Gimme! Gimme! Gimme! (A Man After Midnight)" on YouTube

"Gimme! Gimme! Gimme! (A Man After Midnight)" was the first single released from the soundtrack for the 2008 film version of Mamma Mia! by American actress Amanda Seyfried, who plays Sophie in the film. In the film, only the chorus is sung while the rest of the song is instrumental, much like the original stage play. On the soundtrack, Seyfried sings the complete song as a solo performance, and also does the same in a music video to promote the movie. The version on the soundtrack is a minute shorter than the version featured on the film's tie-in website.

=== Charts ===
Chart performance for "Gimme! Gimme! Gimme! (A Man After Midnight)" by the Mamma Mia! film cast
Chart (2008)	Peak position
Australia (ARIA)	70

=== Certifications ===
Region	Certification	Certified units/sales
United Kingdom (BPI)	Silver	200,000^{‡}
^{‡} Sales+streaming figures based on certification alone.

== Cher version ==
"Gimme! Gimme! Gimme! (A Man After Midnight)"

Single by Cher

from the album Dancing Queen
- Released: 9 August 2018
- Studio: Metrophonic Studios (London, England)
- Length: 4:11
- Label: Warner Bros.
- Songwriters: Benny Andersson; Björn Ulvaeus
- Producer: Mark Taylor

Cher singles chronology
"Fernando" (2018)	"Gimme! Gimme! Gimme! (A Man After Midnight)" (2018)	"SOS" (2018)

Licensed audio
- "Cher - GIMME! GIMME! GIMME! (A Man After Midnight) [Official HD Audio]" on YouTube

American singer and actress Cher covered the song on her album Dancing Queen, released on 28 September 2018. Cher's version is the lead single on the album. The accompanying audio video for "Gimme! Gimme! Gimme! (A Man After Midnight)" was premiered through Cher's official YouTube channel on 9 August 2018. An extended version of the track was later released on 14 September 2018. The song peaked at number 4 on the Hot Dance Club Songs chart.

=== Critical reception ===
Writing for Rolling Stone, Brittany Spanos felt that "working with producer Mark Taylor who helped seal Cher's legacy with the game-changing "Believe" in the late Nineties, she finds subtle changes that update ABBA classics without totally stripping them of the catchiness that made those songs beloved hits well beyond their heyday. "Gimme! Gimme! Gimme! (A Man After Midnight)", "SOS" and "Mamma Mia" are given just enough of a knob turn that they're transformed from upbeat FM radio pop into club bangers, pulsating with every beat."

=== Track listing ===
==== Digital download ====
1. "Gimme! Gimme! Gimme! (A Man After Midnight)" – 4:11

==== Gimme! Gimme! Gimme! (A Man After Midnight) [Extended Mix] – Single ====
1. "Gimme! Gimme! Gimme! (A Man After Midnight) [Extended Mix]" – 7:25

==== Gimme! Gimme! Gimme! (A Man After Midnight) [Midnight Mixes] ====
1. "Gimme! Gimme! Gimme! (A Man After Midnight) [Extended Mix]" – 7:25
2. "Gimme! Gimme! Gimme! (A Man After Midnight) [Offer Nissim Needs a Man Remix]" – 7:19
3. "Gimme! Gimme! Gimme! (A Man After Midnight) [Love To Infinity Classic Remix]" – 5:27
4. "Gimme! Gimme! Gimme! (A Man After Midnight) [Guy Scheiman Anthem Remix]" – 7:19
5. "Gimme! Gimme! Gimme! (A Man After Midnight) [Ralphi Rosario Remix]" – 7:52
6. "Gimme! Gimme! Gimme! (A Man After Midnight) [Love To Infinity Insomniac Remix]" – 6:11
7. "Gimme! Gimme! Gimme! (A Man After Midnight) [Danny Verde Remix]" – 5:54
8. "Gimme! Gimme! Gimme! (A Man After Midnight) [Chris Cox Anthem Remix]" – 6:06
9. "Gimme! Gimme! Gimme! (A Man After Midnight) [Guy Scheiman Anthem Dub Remix]" – 6:06
10. "Gimme! Gimme! Gimme! (A Man After Midnight) [Ralphi Rosario Dub Remix]" – 6:27

=== Credits and personnel ===
Credits for Dancing Queen adapted from AllMusic.

==== Management ====
- Published by Universal Songs of PolyGramInt., Inc. (ASCAP) and EMI Waterford Music Inc. (ASCAP)
- Recorded by Mark Taylor and Paul Meehan at Metrophonic Studios, London
- Mixed by Matt Furmidge and Mark Taylor at Metrophonic Studios, London
- Mastered by Stephen Marcussen Mastering, Hollywood, CA

==== Personnel ====
- Cher – primary vocals
- Benny Andersson – songwriter
- Björn Ulvaeus – songwriter
- Ash Soan – drums
- Adam Phillips – guitars
- Hayley Sanderson – backing vocals
- Andy Caine – backing vocals

=== Charts ===
Chart (2018)	Peak position
Australian Digital Tracks (ARIA)	40
Belgium (Ultratip Bubbling Under Flanders)	37
Finland Downloads (Suomen virallinen singlelista)	7
French Downloads (SNEP)	76
Hungary (Single Top 40)	37
Scottish Singles Sales (Official Charts)	26
Spain Airplay (PROMUSICAE)	31
Spain Physical/Digital Singles (PROMUSICAE)	46
Sweden Digital Song Sales (Billboard)	8
UK Singles Sales (Official Charts Company)	34
US Dance Club Songs (Billboard)	4

== Other notable covers ==
In 2001, the song was covered by the first edition of the French TV reality show Star Academy 1. The performance was credited to Olivia Ruiz, Jenifer Bartoli and Carine Haddadou, three of the contestants. This version topped the music chart in France, dislodging Star Academy's previous hit, "La Musique (Angelica)", and stayed atop for two weeks. It also peaked at number eleven on Belgium's Ultratop 50 chart of Wallonia. The single release also contains the second track, "Brigitte Bardot" (remix edit), recorded by Jean-Pascal Lacoste.

In 2008, the song was covered in a jazz/lounge style by American group BNB on its album Bossa Mia: Songs of ABBA.

Canadian rock band Arkells have covered the song during its live shows. In 2023, it released a studio recording of the cover.

Swedish pop singer Molly Sandén released a version of the song in April 2024, following a live performance on SVT's En Fest för ABBA (A Party for ABBA) concert, celebrating the 50th anniversary of ABBA's Eurovision win.

The Unix/Linux computer operating system command line utility "man" for displaying manual pages would print "gimme gimme gimme" when run without arguments on 00:30 (as the opening lyrics of the song are "half past twelve"). The Easter egg has been removed since version man-db 2.8.0 after it had been discovered as an annoyance in a software automatic test system on 20 November 2017 and brought to broad attention on the Stack Exchange Q&A network site dedicated to Unix & Linux.

== Samplings ==
In 2005, the song was sampled by Madonna, who used it on her worldwide hit single "Hung Up" from Confessions on a Dance Floor. Madonna is said to have sent a letter to Benny Andersson and Björn Ulvaeus asking to use the song as a sample, since the Swedish songwriting duo are reluctant to let other artists sample their material. It was only the second time that an ABBA track had been officially sampled, the first being the Fugees in 1996 with their hit "Rumble in the Jungle", sampling part of 1977's "The Name of the Game".

Madonna used the same sample again in the track Hot Sauce in 2026, a song released in collaboration with Absolut Vodka, as part of the promotional campaign for her 2026 album Confessions II.

Ava Max "subtly sample[d]" the song in her 2019 single "Torn". Max stated that she listened to ABBA and Ace of Base during her childhood, and wanted to "add a little disco flair in there".

Rina Sawayama sampled the chorus of the ABBA song for the guitar riff in her 2022 single "This Hell".

== See also ==
- List of European number-one hits of 1979
- List of number-one singles of 1979 (Ireland)
- List of number-one singles from 1968 to 1979 (Switzerland)
- List of number-one singles of 2002 (France)
