= The King Has Lost His Crown =

Song by ABBA

from the album Voulez-Vous
- A-side: "Gimme! Gimme! Gimme! (A Man After Midnight)"
- Length: 3:35
- Label: Polar Music
- Songwriters: Benny Andersson; Björn Ulvaeus
- Producers: Benny Andersson; Björn Ulvaeus

Audio video
- "The King Has Lost His Crown" on YouTube

"The King Has Lost His Crown" is a song by Swedish group ABBA, released on their 1979 album Voulez-Vous. Lead vocals by Anni-Frid Lyngstad. It was also the B-side of the non-album single "Gimme! Gimme! Gimme! (A Man After Midnight)".

== Synopsis ==
The song is a "vengeful ballad" whose lyrics are an allegory to describe the end of a relationship.

== Critical reception ==
On his book Abba – Uncensored on the Record, John Tobler said the song "appeared to be much more personal than many of the group's previous songs". The Sydney Morning Herald said "The King Has Lost His Crown" is "an interesting song with some neat variations in style". Internet reviewer George Starostin said it "is simply way too pompous and ambitious to be endured". ABBA biograph Carl Magnus Palm said "Perhaps there's ... a sense of "undiscovered gem" about [Voulez-Vous], simply because what I feel were the best tracks were never international single A-sides, such as 'As Good as New', 'The King Has Lost His Crown' and 'If It Wasn't for the Nights'."
