= Put on Your White Sombrero =

Song by ABBA

from the album Thank You for the Music
- B-side: "Dream World"; "Dame Dame Dame"
- Genre: Europop, pop
- Length: 4:34
- Label: PolyGram, Universal Music
- Songwriters: Benny Andersson; Björn Ulvaeus
- Producers: Benny Andersson; Björn Ulvaeus

Audio video
- "Put on Your White Sombrero" on YouTube

"Put on Your White Sombrero" is a song by the Swedish pop group ABBA, recorded during sessions for the band's 1980 album Super Trouper. It had the working titles "Spansk II", "Pig Party On Mallorca" and "Padre". Although recorded in Polar Studios in September 1980, the song did not make it to the final track list of the album.

Despite having completed the track, the group's two songwriters Benny Andersson and Björn Ulvaeus, believing that it would not make a strong single, decided to shelve it in favour of the album's title track. As a result, "Put on Your White Sombrero" would remain unreleased until 1994 when it debuted on the box set Thank You for the Music. It has subsequently been included as a bonus track on most CD reissues of the Super Trouper album since 1997.

The track's arrangement was re-used in the song "Cassandra", which was recorded for ABBA's next intended studio album (following 1981's The Visitors) in the summer of 1982. This project was later abandoned, and the group would instead release a compilation album called The Singles: The First Ten Years in November 1982. "Cassandra" was used as the B-side to the single "The Day Before You Came". "Cassandra" has later surfaced, by popular demand, on ABBA compilation albums and on remastered versions of The Visitors album as a bonus track.

"Put on Your White Sombrero" also appeared as one of the tracks on a limited edition bonus single with the ABBA Gold hits package in 1996.
