= Half-speed mastering =

Phonograph record production technique

Half-speed mastering is a technique occasionally used when cutting the acetate lacquers from which phonograph records are produced. The cutting machine platter is run at half of the usual speed (16 2/3 rpm for 33 1/3 rpm records) while the signal to be recorded is fed to the cutting head at half of its regular playback speed.

The reasons for using this technique vary, but it is generally used for improving the high-frequency response of the finished record. By halving the speed during cutting, very high frequencies that are difficult to cut become much easier to cut since they are now mid-range frequencies.

Mobile Fidelity Sound Lab used half-speed mastering for its Original Master Recording LPs.
