= Angeleyes =

- UK picture sleeve cover

Single by ABBA

from the album Voulez-Vous
- A-side: "Voulez-Vous"
- Released: 6 July 1979
- Recorded: 26 October 1978
- Studio: Polar (Stockholm, Sweden)
- Genre: Pop
- Length: 4:20
- Label: Epic (UK); Atlantic (US)
- Songwriters: Benny Andersson; Björn Ulvaeus
- Producers: Benny Andersson; Björn Ulvaeus

ABBA singles chronology
"Voulez-Vous" (1979)	"Angeleyes" (1979)	"Gimme! Gimme! Gimme! (A Man After Midnight)" (1979)

Audio video
- "Angeleyes" on YouTube

"Angeleyes" (also known as "Angel Eyes") is a song by the Swedish group ABBA. The lyrics and music were composed by Benny Andersson and Björn Ulvaeus, while Agnetha Fältskog and Anni-Frid Lyngstad share lead vocals. It was recorded for their sixth studio album Voulez-Vous (1979), and was released on 6 July 1979, as a double a-side single with "Voulez-Vous" in the United Kingdom. In North America, it was released as an individual single by Atlantic Records.

The track was a success for the group, peaking at number three on the UK Singles Chart. It is featured on the compilation More ABBA Gold: More ABBA Hits (1993).

== Background ==
"Angeleyes" (which had the working title "Katakusom") is a song in which the protagonist beseeches women to avoid the deceptively innocent looking gaze of a handsome yet deceitful man, warning them to beware of the "game he likes to play." The vocals came from Ulvaeus, Agnetha Fältskog and Anni-Frid Lyngstad.

== Release and reception ==
=== Release ===
In the United Kingdom, "Angeleyes" was released as a double A-side with "Voulez-Vous" on 6 July 1979, the only time the group did this. Andersson and Ulvaeus were adamant on "Voulez-Vous" as the single, while the group's British record label, Epic Records, preferred "Angeleyes". A compromise was made, where the two tracks would serve as a double a-side single.

=== Reception ===
==== Critical ====
Tony Jasper of British music magazine Music Week reviewed both sides and responded to "Angeleyes" with a mixed reception, describing the vocals as "slightly shrill", and the production as "less [imaginative]". Likewise, the popular TV series Juke Box Jury, which featured panelists Alan Freeman, Johnny Rotten, Joan Collins, and Elaine Paige, voted the song a "miss", and incorrectly predicted that it would not be a hit for the group. However, American trade magazine Cash Box wrote favorably of "Angeleyes", saying the song has "bubbly female harmonies and a layered, string-driven melody showing an inviting pop-classical influence." Billboard highlighted the track's "lifting melody" and "fulsome harmonies". Correspondingly, Bruce Eder of AllMusic retrospectively cited the song as a standout on the album.

==== Commercial ====
In the United Kingdom, "Angeleyes" / "Voulez-Vous" debuted at number 48 on the UK Singles Chart the week of 14 July 1979, and rose up to the number three position on the chart the week of 11 August 1979, becoming ABBA's 12th consecutive top ten hit in the region. It spent eleven weeks in total on the chart. As of September 2021, the double a-side single is ABBA's 13th most popular song in the UK, including both pure sales and digital streams. Coincidentally, ABBA's "Angeleyes" was in the UK top-twenty at the same time as another unrelated song called "Angel Eyes" by the British rock group Roxy Music. The latter track was composed by musicians Bryan Ferry and Andy Mackay, and although the two songs possess some lyrical similarities, Ferry and Mackay's song is more reminiscent of contemporary pop rock.

The track was less of a success in North America. In the United States, the song was originally only a b-side to "Voulez-Vous", but Atlantic Records, ABBA's American record label, flipped the sides after the latter song received negative reception from radio programmers and did not perform well. "Angeleyes" debuted at number 85 on the Billboard Hot 100 the week of 22 September 1979, and only peaked at number 64 on 13 October 1979, spending five weeks in total. However, it did fare better than "Voulez-Vous", which had only charted at number 80. "Angeleyes", however, charted better in Canada, peaking at number 42 on the RPM Top Singles.

== Impact ==
In 2022, "Angeleyes" became a popular song on the TikTok social media platform. Mashable noted: "TikTokkers have been using the sound, a sped-up version of 'Angeleyes' by ABBA, to reminisce about the things they used to love, from television shows to discontinued candies." ABBA's own TikTok account participated in the trend, posting a video of Björn Ulvaeus and his platform boots set to the song.

== Charts ==
Weekly/bi-weekly chart performance for "Angeleyes"
Chart (1979–80)	Peak position
Canada (CRIA)	39
Canada Top Singles (RPM)	42
UK Singles (Official Charts)	3
US Billboard Hot 100	64
US Adult Contemporary (Billboard)	37
US Cash Box Top 100	76
US Pop/Adult Airplay (Radio & Records)	28
US Record World Singles	77

Chart (2018)	Peak position
Scottish Singles Sales (Official Charts)	91

== Certifications ==
Certifications and sales for "Angeleyes"
Region	Certification	Certified units/sales
New Zealand (RMNZ)	Gold	15,000^{‡}
United Kingdom (BPI)	Gold	500,000^{‡}
^{‡} Sales+streaming figures based on certification alone.

== Mamma Mia! Here We Go Again version ==
"Angel Eyes" was released on 13 July 2018, alongside the soundtrack of Mamma Mia! Here We Go Again, by Capitol and Polydor Records. The song is performed by Julie Walters (Rosie), Christine Baranski (Tanya) and Amanda Seyfried (Sophie) and it was produced by Benny Andersson.

=== Charts ===
Chart (2018)	Peak position
Scottish Singles Sales (Official Charts)	61

=== Certifications ===
Region	Certification	Certified units/sales
United Kingdom (BPI)	Silver	200,000^{‡}
^{‡} Sales+streaming figures based on certification alone.
