= Chiquitita =

1979 ABBA song

Single by ABBA

from the album Voulez-Vous
- B-side: "Lovelight"
- Released: 16 January 1979
- Recorded: 13 December 1978
- Studio: Polar, Stockholm, Sweden
- Genre: Pop; soft rock; schlager
- Length: 5:26
- Label: Polar (Sweden); Epic (UK); Atlantic (US)
- Songwriters: Benny Andersson; Björn Ulvaeus
- Producers: Benny Andersson; Björn Ulvaeus

ABBA singles chronology
"Summer Night City" (1978)	"Chiquitita" (1979)	"Does Your Mother Know" (1979)

Music video
- "Chiquitita" on YouTube

"Chiquitita" is a song recorded by the Swedish pop group ABBA, recorded for their sixth studio album Voulez-Vous (1979). Agnetha Fältskog performs the lead vocals. The song had multiple working titles, and was one of the last tracks to be recorded for the album. It was released on 16 January 1979 via Polar Music, as the lead single to Voulez-Vous. The group debuted the single for the first time in the Music for UNICEF Concert. Originally, "If It Wasn't for the Nights" was planned as the lead single, but once "Chiquitita" was completed, it was scrapped as a single altogether and remained an album track. The non-album song "Lovelight" served as the B-side to the track.

The song initially received mixed reviews from music critics, receiving comparisons to their earlier hit "Fernando". However, it has retrospectively been praised and ranked as one of the group's finest songs. It was a massive commercial success, reaching the number one spot in Belgium, Finland, Ireland, the Netherlands, New Zealand, Portugal, and Switzerland. In the United Kingdom, it peaked at number two on the UK singles chart, becoming their first lead single since "So Long" to miss the top spot; it did however reach number one on the charts provided by NME. It also became a top forty hit in Canada and the US Billboard Hot 100.

During the year, RCA Records, ABBA's record company in most of South America, proposed recording one of the group's current hits in Spanish, which was suggested by employee Buddy McCluskey. In collaboration with his wife Mary McCluskey, the two put together the Spanish lyrics to "Chiquitita", which was released in April in Argentina. The Spanish version of "Chiquitita" was an extraordinary success in Latin America and Spain, topping charts all over the region, selling over 2.5 million copies, and was said to have been the biggest hit in Latin America in twenty-five years.

"Chiquitita" is included on ABBA Gold (1992), and is featured in the Mamma Mia! play and the Mamma Mia! film, although it was omitted from the soundtrack of the film.

== Background and release ==
Many preliminary versions of "Chiquitita" exist. It had working titles of "Kålsupare", "3 Wise Guys", "Chiquitita Angelina" and "In the Arms of Rosalita". A revised version, which had a sound that was influenced by the Peruvian song "El Condor Pasa (If I Could)" performed by Simon and Garfunkel, was recorded in December 1978 and released as a single in January 1979.

Agnetha Fältskog is the sole vocalist for approximately the first minute of the finished recording. Thereafter, she is joined by Anni-Frid Lyngstad, who sing in harmony for the rest of the song.

With the success of the English version, ABBA recorded "Chiquitita" in Spanish, and it was one of the featured tracks on the Spanish-language release Gracias Por La Música.

During production of the Thank You for the Music box set in 1994, an early version of "Chiquitita" titled "In the Arms of Rosalita" was proposed for inclusion on the set, but was rejected by the songwriters. An 8-minute "Chiquitita story" medley combining the song with various early demos (including the "Rosalita" version) was scrapped by mid-1994.

== Reception ==
"Chiquitita" proved to be one of ABBA's bigger hits. It was featured in the Music for UNICEF Concert, broadcast worldwide from the United Nations General Assembly in 1979. As a direct result of this event, ABBA donated 50% of all royalties from the song to UNICEF. "Chiquitita" was a no. 1 hit in Belgium, Finland, Ireland, the Netherlands, New Zealand, Spain, Switzerland, Mexico, South Africa and Rhodesia. It was a top 5 hit in ABBA's native Sweden, the United Kingdom (peaking at no. 2 in both countries where Blondie's "Heart of Glass" was occupying the top spot), Australia, Germany and Norway. These sales make it the most successful single from the album Voulez-Vous in terms of global charts and one of the more famous charity songs ever. Fifty percent of the proceeds from the song go to UNICEF in recognition of the "International Year of the Child" in 1979. In 2014, all ABBA members agreed on increasing their donation to 100% of all royalties from the song to UNICEF. As of 2021, the song's royalties had raised $4.8 million for the charity.

In the United Kingdom, "Chiquitita" was released on 26 Jan 1979. The song received mixed reviews. The Manchester Evening News gave a review that the single is “evidence that they haven't lost their touch… The song, owing more than a little to the Latin-flavoured classic Fernando some years ago, is the foursome’s gift UNICEF’S Year of the Child. It’s yet another smooth as-silk production and arrangement of their own composition by Björn and Benny with atmospheric Spanish guitars playing in the girls’ very commercial harmonies. A sure-fire hit”.Julie Burchill wrote in the New Musical Express. “It really is a rubbish song; ABBA sang it on the UNICEF show. WHY?…This will be a hit, but not a massive one. It lurches into insubstantial singalong chorus-thingy much too soon”. "Chiquitita" debuted at no. 8 in the British singles chart on 3 Feb 1979, making it the highest place début for any ABBA single release. The following week, "Chiquitita" peaked at no. 2.

In Spain, "Chiquitita" had a positive reception and was revered as “the best ABBA song, even more so than "Fernando".” El Adelantado De Segovia gave a review when the Spanish version was released “With "Chiquita," Abba has demonstrated that they possess more creative qualities that are almost unsuspected at this point in their brilliant career”. Helped by the Spanish version, "Chiquitita" topped the Superventas (Bestsellers) chart in May 1979. On 29th May, the band visited Spain to promote "Chiquitita" and "Voulez-Vous" (the follow-up single and album).

In Argentina, sales figures up to the end of July 1979 on the single show 500,000 in the Spanish edition and 25,000 in the original English language format.

"Chiquitita" was not released in the USA until 29 October 1979. Record World described the song as having a "distinctive Latin flavour". Cash Box wrote that it has "a bouncy tune" with "soaring harmonies."

As of September 2021, it is ABBA's ninth-biggest song in the UK, including both pure sales and digital streams.

== Music video ==
"Chiquitita" was one of the few singles ABBA released without a custom-made video. Since then, on compilations of the group's videos, a contemporary TV performance of the song has been used, recorded in mid-February 1979, a month after the single's release. This clip was taped by the BBC during recording of the show ABBA in Switzerland, broadcast across Europe at Easter 1979, but this clip did not feature in the broadcast, being intended for a Christmas programme.

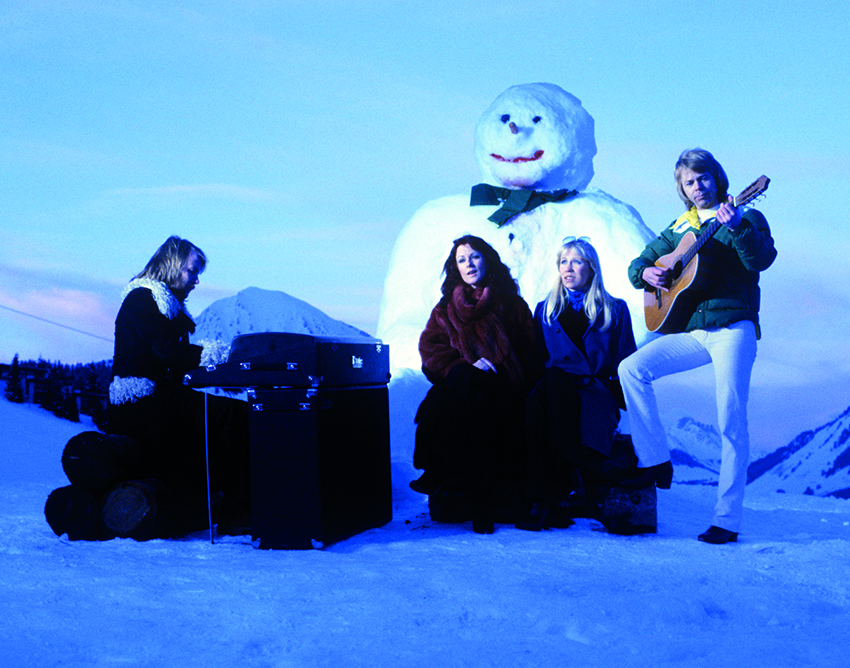
A still from the "Chiquitita" music video from ABBA in Switzerland

ABBA are seen performing the song on a mountainside, with a snowman in the background. Throughout the clip, the bad weather and bad light caused problems during filming, which affected Anni-Frid Lyngstad; her hair constantly flew in her face, and she was forced to keep moving it out of her eyes, so it was not used. During the location shoot in Leysin, the BBC recorded two other versions of the group lip-synching to the song. The group performed the song inside the BBC Big Top used to host ABBA in Switzerland, which was included in the final broadcast, and a second video was shot of the group sitting around a table in a cafe, for the show Christmas Snowtime Special shown on BBC1 on 23 December 1979, hosted by Dame Edna Everage. The clip of the group filmed outside with the snowman was intended for this Christmas show, but producer/director Michael Hurll recorded the second clip because he was not happy with the first. In March 2022, a new lyric video was released featuring the mountainside footage.

== Personnel ==
- Agnetha Fältskog – lead vocals
- Anni-Frid Lyngstad – backing vocals
- Björn Ulvaeus – guitar
- Benny Andersson – keyboards

== Charts ==
=== Weekly charts ===
Weekly/bi-weekly chart performance for "Chiquitita"
Chart (1979–1980)	Peak position
Argentina (CAPIF)	1
Australia (Kent Music Report)	4
Austria (Ö3 Austria Top 40)	6
Belgium (Ultratop 50 Flanders)	1
Belgium (Ultratip Bubbling Under Wallonia)	1
Brazil (Pandisc)	3
Canada (CRIA)	17
Canada Top Singles (RPM)	36
Canada Adult Contemporary (RPM)	14
Finland (Suomen virallinen lista)	1
Ireland (Irish Singles Chart)	1
Japan (Music Labo)	16
Netherlands (Dutch Top 40)	1
Netherlands (Single Top 100)	1
Mexico (Radio Mil)	1
New Zealand (Recorded Music NZ)	1
Norway (VG-lista)	4
Portugal (Musica & Som)	1
Sweden (Sverigetopplistan)	2
Switzerland (Schweizer Hitparade)	1
UK Singles (NME)	1
UK Singles (Official Charts)	2
US Billboard Hot 100	29
US Adult Contemporary (Billboard)	15
US Cash Box Top 100	36
US Pop/Adult Airplay (Radio & Records)	16
US Record World Singles	47
West Germany (GfK)	3

=== Year-end charts ===
Year-end chart performance for "Chiquitita"
Chart (1979)	Rank
Australia (Kent Music Report)	40
Belgium (Ultratop Flanders)	2
Germany (Official German Charts)	8
Netherlands (Dutch Top 40)	4
Netherlands (Single Top 100)	2
New Zealand (Recorded Music NZ)	9
South Africa (Springbok Radio)	17
Switzerland (Schweizer Hitparade)	9
UK (Music Week)	16
US (Joel Whitburn's Pop Annual)	167

Chart (2021)	Peak position
Sweden (Sverigetopplistan)	82

== Certifications and sales ==
Region	Certification	Certified units/sales
Argentina	—	700,000
Chile	—	75,000
Denmark (IFPI Danmark)	Gold	45,000^{‡}
Ecuador	—	75,000
El Salvador	—	65,000
France	—	150,000
Japan (RIAJ) SOS / Chiquitita	Platinum	100,000^{^}
Kenya	—	10,000
Mexico	—	500,000
New Zealand (RMNZ)	Platinum	30,000^{‡}
Netherlands (NVPI)	Gold	100,000^{^}
Portugal	—	20,000
Spain	—	100,000
Spain (Promusicae) Since 2015	Gold	30,000^{‡}
United Kingdom (BPI)	Platinum	600,000^{‡}
Summaries
Latin America	—	2,250,000
^{^} Shipments figures based on certification alone.^{‡} Sales+streaming figures based on certification alone.

== Cher version ==
"Chiquitita"

Single by Cher
- Language: Spanish, English
- Released: 8 May 2020
- Recorded: 2020
- Studio: Metrophonic Studios (London, England)
- Genre: Pop; Europop
- Length: 4:49
- Label: Warner
- Songwriters: Benny Andersson; Björn Ulvaeus; Buddy and Mary McCluskey
- Producer: Mark Taylor

Cher singles chronology
"SOS" (2018)	"Chiquitita" (2020)	"Stop Crying Your Heart Out" (2020)

Music video
- "Chiquitita (Spanish Version)" on YouTube

On May 8, 2020, American singer-actress Cher announced she had re-recorded Chiquitita in Spanish with all proceeds going to UNICEF, similar to how ABBA had done in 1979 with the release of the same song.

Cher's Spanish version of "Chiquitita" became her first song to chart on a U.S. Latin chart. It charted at No. 6 on the US Latin Digital Song Sales (Billboard).

=== Music video ===
An accompanying music video for "Chiquitita" premiered on UNICEF's website on 9 May 2020 and uploaded to Cher's official YouTube channel shortly afterward. Cher shot her part at home, with the final cut of the video featuring children from around the world.

=== Track listings and formats ===
Digital download

- "Chiquitita (Spanish Version)" – 4:49
- "Chiquitita" – 5:14

=== Credits and personnel ===
Credits for Dancing Queen adapted from AllMusic.

Management

- Published by Universal Songs of PolyGramInt., Inc. (ASCAP) and EMI Grove Park Music Inc. (BMI)
- Recorded by Mark Taylor and Paul Meehan at Metrophonic Studios, London
- Mixed at by Matt Furmidge and Mark Taylor at Metrophonic Studios, London
- Mastered by Sthephen Marcussen Mastering, Hollywood, CA

Personnel

- Cher – primary vocals
- Ash Soan – drums
- Adam Phillips – guitars
- Hayley Sanderson – backing vocals
- Andy Caine – backing vocals

=== Charts ===
Chart (2020)	Peak position
US Latin Digital Song Sales (Billboard)	6

== Other notable covers ==
- A Spanish version of Album "Chiquitita" was released by the Puerto Rican group Menudo (group) in 1979 and was a huge success, earning a gold record.
- A Spanish version of "Chiquitita" released as a single by Amaia Montero in 2010 became a number one in the Spanish charts.
- Sinead O'Connor released a cover of "Chiquitita" as a single in 1998, which was included in the 2003 compilation album "She Who Dwells in the Secret Place of the Most High Shall Abide Under the Shadow of the Almighty".
- Marco Paulo released a Portuguese version of "Chiquitita" in 1995 as part of his album Beijinhos Doces.

== See also ==
- List of best-selling singles by country
- List of best-selling Latin singles
