= As Good as New =

Single by ABBA

from the album Voulez-Vous
- A-side: "I Have a Dream"
- Released: October 1979
- Recorded: 14 March 1979
- Studio: Polar, Stockholm
- Genre: Funk
- Length: 3:24
- Label: Polar Music
- Songwriters: Benny Andersson; Björn Ulvaeus
- Producers: Benny Andersson; Björn Ulvaeus

ABBA singles chronology
"Gimme! Gimme! Gimme! (A Man After Midnight)" (1979)	"As Good as New" (1979)	"I Have a Dream" (1979)

Audio video
- "As Good As New" on YouTube

"As Good as New" is a song by the Swedish recording group ABBA. The track is taken from their sixth studio album Voulez-Vous (1979), and serves as the opening track. The lead vocals are provided by Agnetha Fältskog. The song was released as a single in Mexico as a double A-side with "I Have a Dream", where it became ABBA's ninth and last number one hit. "As Good as New" was also released in Argentina and Bolivia.

== History ==
As usual, the song was written and composed by Andersson and Ulvaeus. It originally had the working title "It's Better Now".
