= Carl Magnus Palm =

Swedish author and historian

- Born: 1965 (age 60–61); Sweden
- Occupations: Author, historian
- Writing career
- Period: 1990s–
- Genres: Music, Biography
- Notable works: ABBA – The Complete Recording Sessions; Bright Lights Dark Shadows – The Real Story Of ABBA
- Website: www.carlmagnuspalm.com

Carl Magnus Palm (born 1965) is a Swedish author and historian, writing in Swedish and English, best known for his work on the Swedish pop group ABBA.

== ABBA ==
Carl Magnus Palm’s first book on ABBA was ABBA – The Complete Recording Sessions, a diary-format chronicle of ABBA’s recorded work, published in 1994. Parallel with that book project he was involved in the compilation of the CD box set Thank You For The Music, also released in 1994.

Palm is the author of the biography Bright Lights Dark Shadows – The Real Story Of ABBA published in 2001 and referred to as "definitive" and "the first authoritative biography" of ABBA, although some reviewers found it "dense and at times hardgoing".

Palm published his first full-scale Swedish-language biography, ABBA – The Story, in 2008. The book met with mixed reviews: some felt that the book didn't live up to expectations and that "the ultimate ABBA bible has yet to be written", while others opined that "if you're going to read something about [ABBA], this is the one to get".

Palm is a frequent contributor of research and liner notes to official ABBA-related CDs and DVDs, as well as the co-producer of three television documentaries about ABBA. Palm has also contributed to ABBA The Museum in Stockholm, and to the website ABBA The Official Site.

In 2015, Palm started a crowdfunding project to self-publish a revised, updated and expanded edition of his first ABBA book ABBA – The Complete Recording Sessions. The campaign was successful and ABBA – The Complete Recording Sessions (revised and expanded edition) was published in March 2017.

== Other work ==
Carl Magnus Palm’s first book was Monica Zetterlund – En diskografi (1992), a discography about the Swedish jazz singer, co-written with Thomas Winberg. He has also written a book about The Beatles, entitled Beatles Beatles (1996), and in 2010 he co-wrote Tunna skivor av mig, the memoirs of Swedish singer Siw Malmkvist.

== Bibliography ==
- Monica Zetterlund - en diskografi (with Thomas Winberg), 1992.
- ABBA - The Complete Recording Sessions, 1994.
- ABBA - människorna och musiken (”ABBA - The People And The Music”), 1996.
- Beatles - Beatles, 1996.
- Från ABBA till Mamma Mia! (with Anders Hanser), 1999. Published in English as From ABBA To Mamma Mia!, 2000.
- Bright Lights Dark Shadows - The Real Story Of ABBA, 2001.
- Cadillac Madness - den otroliga berättelsen om The Hep Stars (”Cadillac Madness - The Incredible Story Of The Hep Stars”, with Dan-Eric Landén), 2004.
- Benny’s Road To ABBA, 2004.
- ABBA - The Complete Guide To Their Music, 2005.
- ABBA - The Story: berättelsen om supergruppen (”ABBA - The Story: The Story About The Super Group”), 2008.
- Tunna skivor av mig (”Thin Slices Of Me”, with Siw Malmkvist), 2010.
- ABBA – The Backstage Stories (with Ingmarie Halling), 2014. Published as ABBA – The Treasures in English-speaking countries.
- ABBA - The Complete Recording Sessions (revised and expanded edition), 2017.
- ABBA At 50, 2022.
- Charlesworth, Chris, ed. (8 September 2008). "Abba Gold". Twenty Five Albums that Rocked the World. Omnibus Press. ISBN 1-84772-626-7.
- ABBA on Record, 2024.
