= Ola Brunkert =

Swedish musician (1946–2008)

- Born: 15 September 1946; Örebro Olaus Petri Parish, Sweden
- Died: 16 March 2008 (aged 61) Artà, Mallorca, Spain
- Genres: Pop; rock; schlager
- Occupations: Drummer, session musician
- Instrument: Drums
- Years active: 1960s–2008
- Labels: Polar; Polydor; Atlantic; Epic; RCA
- Formerly of: ABBA

Ola Brunkert (15 September 1946 – 16 March 2008) was a Swedish drummer who was one of the main session drummers for the pop group ABBA. Brunkert and bassist Rutger Gunnarsson are the only two side musicians to appear on every ABBA album prior to Voyage (2021).

== Career ==
Born in Örebro, Sweden, Brunkert began playing the drums in 1958 and cited jazz drummer Gene Krupa as a significant early influence. He played with Slim's Blues Gang, before joining the pop group Science Poption. He then formed the jazz-rock combo Opus III with the guitarist Janne Schaffer, and by 1970 had become one of the most sought-after session drummers in Stockholm.

He was not among the four members of ABBA whose faces adorned the album covers, but was a key supporting musician for the group as it achieved stardom. Brunkert played on the group's first single "People Need Love", their Eurovision hit "Waterloo", and consistently on a great many of their recordings throughout the 1970s. ABBA promised that "one day we're gonna let you hear him sing" in the liner notes for the album Arrival in 1976. His last recording session with the group was in October 1981, recording their hit single "One of Us".

Brunkert and Gunnarsson appeared on stage with ABBA at the 1974 Eurovision Song Contest final in Brighton, and played with them on their concert tours of Europe and Australia in 1977, North America and Europe in 1979, and Japan in 1980.

== Personal life ==
As reported in The Times of 18 March 2008, he bought a property in the Betlem housing complex in Artà, Majorca, Spain, in the 1980s and lived there for the remainder of his life. It was at his home that he died, less than a year after the death of his wife, Inger, in 2007.

=== Death ===
Brunkert died after an accidental fall at the age of 61. He was found with cuts on his neck, causing initial suspicion as to his death. Brunkert had hit his head against a glass door in his dining room, shattering the glass and cutting himself in the neck. He had managed to wrap a towel around his neck and leave the house to seek help, but collapsed in the garden.
