= Voulez-Vous (song) =

1979 single by the Swedish group ABBA

Single by ABBA

from the album Voulez-Vous
- B-side: "Angeleyes"
- Released: 6 July 1979
- Recorded: 13 March 1978 – 29 March 1979
- Studio: Criteria (Miami, US); Polar (Stockholm, Sweden)
- Genre: Disco
- Length: 5:11 (album version); 4:21 (single version); 6:09 (extended promo version)
- Label: Polar; Atlantic (12-inch single)
- Songwriters: Benny Andersson; Björn Ulvaeus
- Producers: Benny Andersson; Björn Ulvaeus

ABBA singles chronology
"Does Your Mother Know" (1979)	"Voulez-Vous" (1979)	"Angeleyes" (1979)
"Dancing Queen" (1992)	"Voulez-Vous" (1992)	"Thank You For The Music" (1992)

Music video
- "Voulez-Vous" on YouTube

12-inch disco single

"Voulez-Vous" (pronounced [vule vu] voo-lay-voo; French for "Do you want (to)?") is a 1979 song by the Swedish group ABBA, written and composed by Benny Andersson and Björn Ulvaeus. Agnetha Fältskog and Anni-Frid Lyngstad shared the lead vocals. It is the second track on the group's 1979 album of the same name. In the UK and Ireland, "Voulez-Vous" was released as a double A-side with "Angeleyes", though nearly everywhere else, "Voulez-Vous" was a single A-side. The double A side single is, as of September 2021, ABBA's 13th-biggest song in the UK, including both pure sales and digital streams.

The song also features on the album Gold: Greatest Hits, first as a 4:21 edited version when the compilation was first released in 1992 and then in its full 5:09 version from 1999 onwards. "Angeleyes" is featured on the More Gold: More Hits compilation. "Voulez-Vous" was re-released as a single in 1992 to promote Gold: Greatest Hits. "Voulez-Vous" is also the only ABBA song to have been officially released as an extended dance remix – albeit only as a promo. The 6:07 version of the track, released as a double A-side 12-inch single by Atlantic Records in the United States in 1979, was included as a bonus track on the 2001 compilation The Definitive Collection.

A songwriting trip to the Bahamas saw the birth of this melody, and the proximity to Miami made it convenient to record the backing track at Criteria Studios with members of the disco group Foxy. "Voulez-Vous" is the only ABBA song (other than live recordings) to be recorded outside of Sweden, additionally the use of the Phrygian dominant scale marks it as unusual as a pop song and gives it a unique sound.

== Reception ==
Billboard described "Voulez-Vous" as one of ABBA's "most dynamic tracks", stating that it contains "almost Russian sounding musical accents". Cash Box said the song was "a return to shimmering Euro-pop with a chirpy disco beat and bright horns," and praised the vocal performance.

Brian Chin, Disco Editor of Record World described the extended mix as "revved-up pop, resembling the Bee Gees' melodic style. The repetition of the punchline gets a bit wearing by the end of the cut, but a good two-thirds of it is very easy to take, a perfect rock-ish change of pace".

Compared to ABBA's hits both before and after, "Voulez-Vous" was not a major hit for the group. However, it did top the charts in Belgium, while reaching the Top 3 in Great Britain, Ireland and The Netherlands. It also peaked at No. 9 in France, Spain and Switzerland.

== Track listings ==
- 7-inch vinyl

A: "Voulez-Vous"
B: "Angeleyes"

- 12-inch vinyl

A: "Voulez-Vous"
B: "Does Your Mother Know"

- 1992 CD re-issue
1. "Voulez Vous"
2. "Summer Night City"

== Charts ==
=== Weekly charts ===
1979 weekly chart performance for "Voulez-Vous"
Chart (1979)	Peak position
Australia (Kent Music Report)	79
Belgium (Ultratop 50 Flanders)	1
Canada Top Singles (RPM)	87
Finland (Suomen virallinen lista)	20
Ireland (IRMA)	3
Israel (IBA)	3
Japan (Music Labo)	18
Netherlands (Dutch Top 40)	4
Netherlands (Single Top 100)	3
Spain (El Gran Musical)	9
Switzerland (Schweizer Hitparade)	9
UK Singles (Official Charts)	3
US Billboard Hot 100	80
US Adult Contemporary (Billboard)	37
US Cash Box Top 100	85
US Record World Singles	77
West Germany (GfK)	14

=== Year-end charts ===
Chart (1979)	Position
Belgium (Ultratop 50 Flanders)	15
Netherlands (Dutch Top 40)	54
Netherlands (Single Top 100)	83
UK Singles (OCC)	51

== Certifications and sales ==
Region	Certification	Certified units/sales
Denmark (IFPI Danmark)	Gold	45,000^{‡}
France	—	100,000
New Zealand (RMNZ)	Gold	15,000^{‡}
Portugal	—	9,500
United Kingdom (BPI) digital sales since 2004	Platinum	600,000^{‡}
^{‡} Sales+streaming figures based on certification alone.
