= Rutger Gunnarsson =

Swedish musician

- Gunnarsson in 1983 at Polar Studios

Background information
- Born: Johan Rutger Gunnarsson; 12 February 1946; Linköping, Sweden
- Died: 30 April 2015 (aged 69) Stockholm, Sweden
- Genres: Pop; rock; schlager
- Occupations: Musician; producer; arranger
- Instruments: Bass; guitar
- Years active: 1960s–2015
- Labels: Polar; Polydor; Atlantic; Epic; RCA
- Formerly of: ABBA

Johan Rutger Gunnarsson (12 February 1946 – 30 April 2015) was a Swedish musician, bass guitarist, guitarist, arranger and producer. He was closely associated with the pop group ABBA.

== Career ==
Gunnarsson grew up in Ledberg parish. His career began with Björn Ulvaeus in the Hootenanny Singers. He went on to work with ABBA, playing on all their albums and participating in their tours. He later worked on several musicals and musical events, including: Chess, Les Misérables, Rhapsody In Rock, 007, Mamma Mia! and Diggiloo. Gunnarsson also arranged strings and played bass for others, including Celine Dion, Westlife, Elton John, Lee Hazlewood, Adam Ant and Bobbysocks. He produced and arranged music for artists such as Gwen Stefani, Elin Lanto and Alla Pugacheva.
