= Polar Studios =

Recording studio in Stockholm, Sweden

Coordinates: 59°20′12″N 18°02′05″E

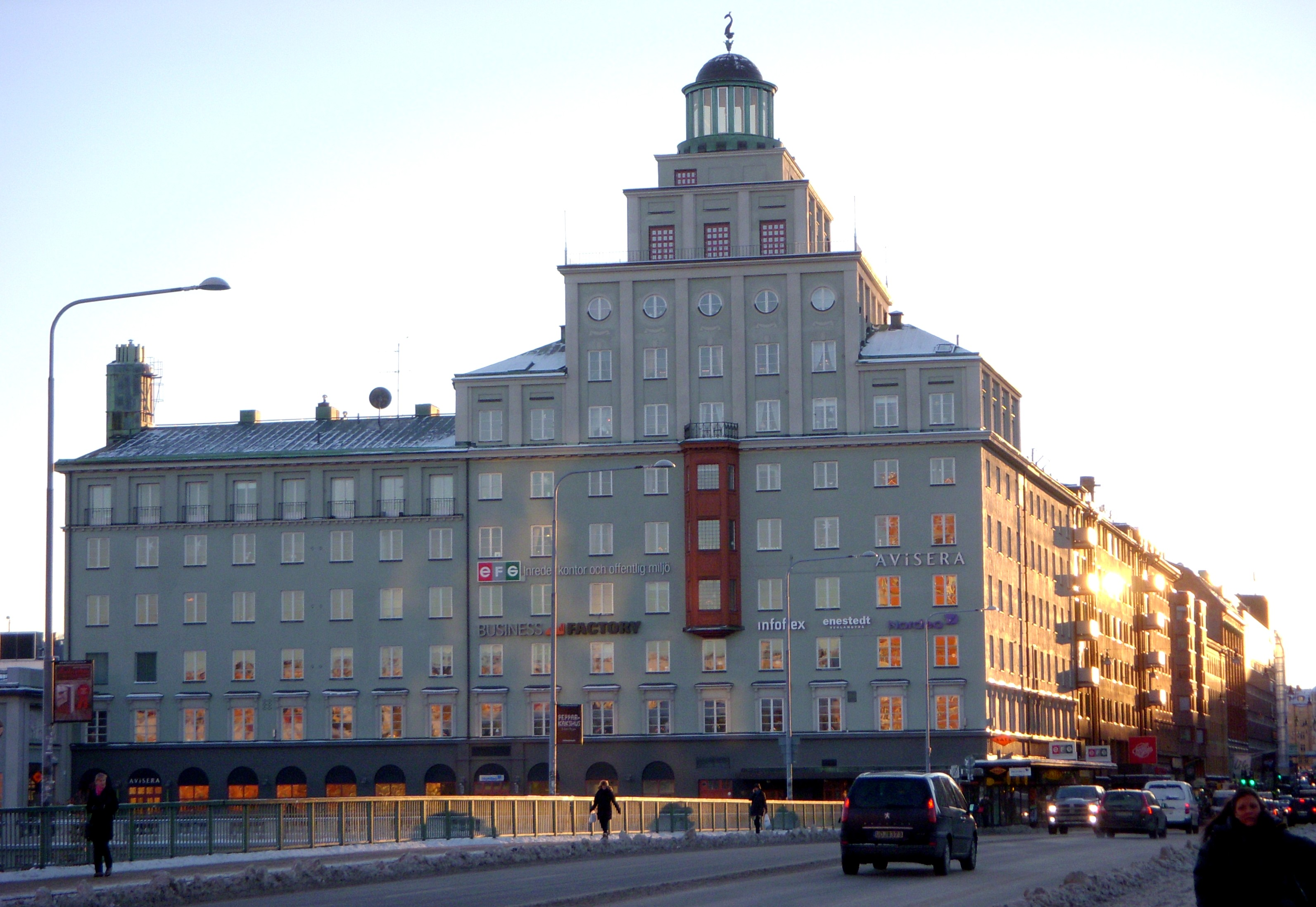
The cinema building as seen from the Sankt Eriksbron, 2010

Polar Studios was a recording studio in Stockholm, Sweden, which operated at its original location from 1978 until 2004. The studio was formed by ABBA musicians Björn Ulvaeus and Benny Andersson and the band's manager Stig Anderson, owner of the Polar Music recording label.

The studio was used to record the last three ABBA albums, Voulez-Vous, Super Trouper and The Visitors, as well as their two non-LP singles "The Day Before You Came" and "Under Attack". Following the demise of ABBA, all members of the group continued using the studio to record their solo projects.

In addition to ABBA, a range of other well-known artists recorded at Polar. Among the albums to have been recorded at the studio are Led Zeppelin's In Through the Out Door and Genesis' Duke.

== History ==
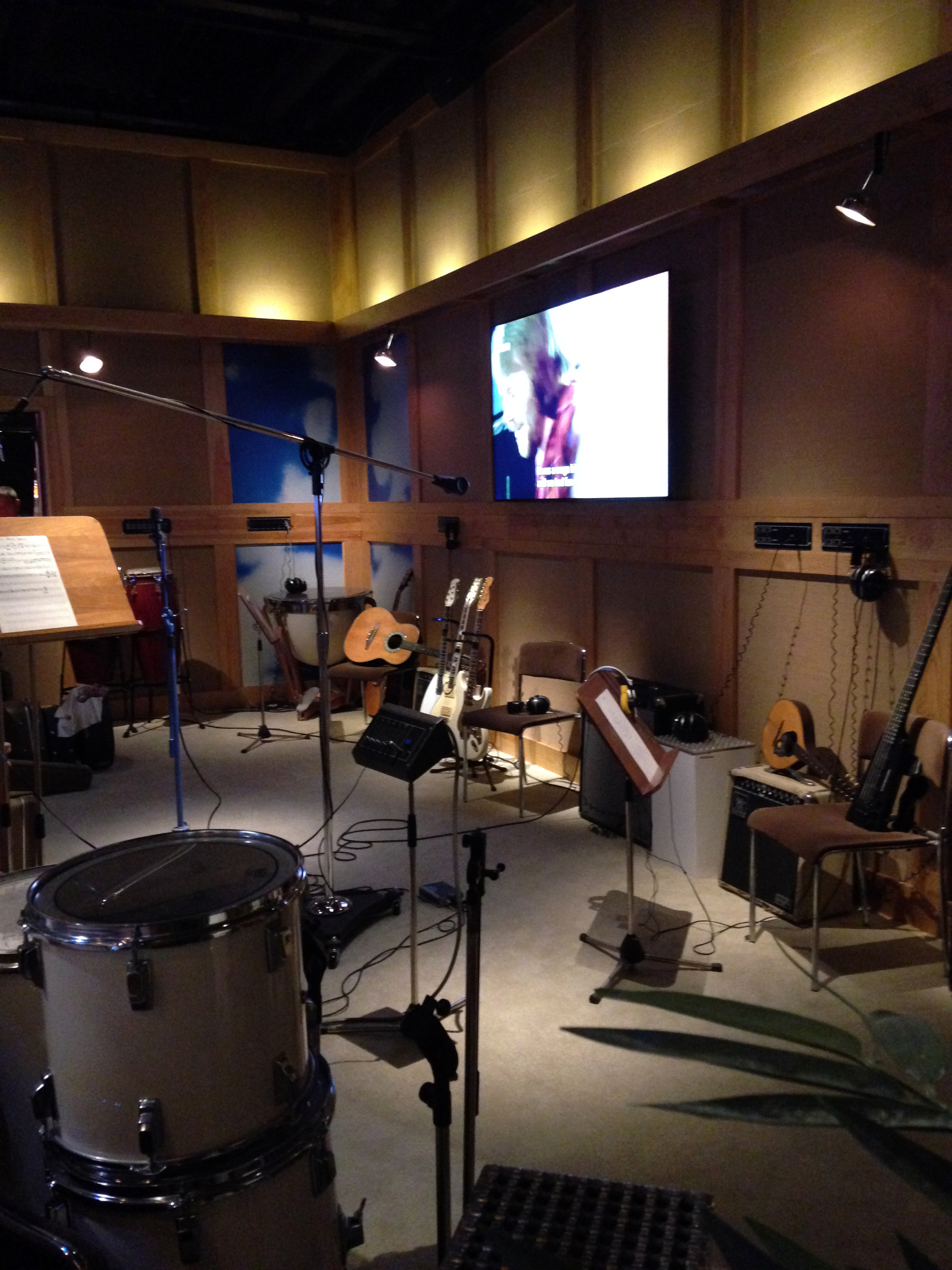
Polar Studios reconstructed in ABBA: The Museum at Djurgården in Stockholm

The studio opened on May 18, 1978, in a disused cinema in central Stockholm. The cinema, last known as Riverside, was part of Sportpalatset (the Sports Palace) on Sankt Eriksgatan in the Kungsholmen district. The building dates from the early 1930s and had housed a swimming pool, tennis courts and other sports facilities until 1956. ABBA had been looking for a modern studio with a good, spacious live sound where they would be able to work at their own leisure and decided that the best solution was to build their own. According to ABBA's sound engineer Michael B. Tretow, the idea was first discussed in May 1974, four years before the opening. He wrote in 1979 that the owners had asked Tom Hidley of Eastlake to help with the design, and that the Swedish acoustician Jan Setterberg and the architect Michael Borowski adapted it. In a letter to Recording Engineer/Producer the same year, Setterberg wrote that ABBA had paid Hidley a design fee but wanted a more distinctive design, and that the design work was then done by himself and Borowski. The recording rooms were built as separate units resting on rubber blocks, so that no sound or vibration would pass between them. ABBA's sleeve designer Rune Söderqvist made the cloud panels on the walls and a large mechanical "music machine" that stood in the entrance. According to the ABBA historian Carl Magnus Palm, the first recording made at the studio, in early June 1978, was an album by the Swedish piano duo Dubbelpianisterna, and ABBA's own first known session there followed on June 5. The band went on to record their next three studio albums, Voulez-Vous, Super Trouper and The Visitors, at Polar Studios. By 1980 a second, smaller studio, known as Studio B, had been fitted out on an upper floor of the building, in a space first meant for recreation. ABBA used it for some of the sessions for "The Day Before You Came", and the concept album Chess was mixed there in 1984.

Among the early non-ABBA albums recorded at the studio were the Genesis album Duke (1980), followed by ABBA singer Anni-Frid Lyngstad's solo album Something's Going On (which was produced by Genesis drummer Phil Collins). Led Zeppelin recorded their 1979 album In Through the Out Door here. Artists such as Big Country, the Ramones, Rammstein, Roxy Music, Genesis, Adam Ant, Backstreet Boys, Beastie Boys, Belinda Carlisle, Burt Bacharach, Embracingfranki (Franki), Celine Dion, Roxette, Terra Firma, Entombed, The Hellacopters, Joan Armatrading, Agnetha Fältskog and many major Swedish artists worked at Polar Studios.

The centrepiece of the studio was a 40-channel Harrison 32 Series mixing console, which was modified by technician Leif Mases to give it a unique sound that in some respects resembled a Neve desk. The console is now kept at ABBA: The Museum in Stockholm. ABBA's 1981 album The Visitors marked a turning point for Polar, as it was recorded on the studio's new 3M digital recorder - thus becoming one of the first digital mainstream pop records.

The music video for ABBA's 1979 song "Gimme! Gimme! Gimme! (A Man After Midnight)" was filmed in the studio; it depicted the group recording the track, although in reality the audio recording was already complete. On the same day, the group also filmed the Spanish language video for "Estoy Soñando" there.

=== Ownership history and closure ===
The studio's original location was a former cinema theatre, in an early 1930s building at Sankt Eriksgatan 58-60 on Kungsholmen. Construction began on the studio in 1977, and it opened for production on May 18, 1978. In 1984, Stig Anderson bought out his partners in the company. Shortly afterward, he sold the studio to his daughter Marie Ledin, her husband Tomas Ledin, and their business partner Lennart Östlund.

In 2004, the private housing cooperative that owned the building which housed Polar raised the space's yearly rent to $184,000—triple the amount asked of other renters in the building. As a result, the studio vacated its original location on May 1 of that year. Attempts to have the studio protected as a listed building failed, because its walls and floors were not fixed parts of the building, and a proposal to turn it into a museum also came to nothing. The premises were first taken over by a gym and later became the head office of the optician chain Synsam. Some time later, the former owners of Polar relocated to a new facility at Kingside Studio. The studio moved several more times; the last address was in Hammarby Sjöstad in Stockholm. In the fall of 2015 business was scaled down and equipment was moved to a warehouse.

=== Legacy ===
In 2010, ABBA The Museum premiered an exhibit that attempted to recreate the band's Polar Studios setup.

== Equipment ==
Polar's recording facility consisted of two different sections, one that utilized analog tape machines and one that implemented the cutting-edge digital equipment of the day.

Studio A featured a Solid State Logic 4056 mixing console, coupled with any combination of a Studer A-820 24-track, Studer A-827 24-track, or Otari DTR-900 MK II 32-track tape machines. Studio A featured four separate isolated rooms, each with varying acoustics. Polar's Studio B maintained a Harrison 32C mixing console, 48-channel Calrec UA 8000 mixing board paired with a 3M digital 32-track audio recorder. When Polar premiered this setup in 1981, it was one of the first digital studios in the world. Studio B consisted of one "live room" in which musicians performed.
