= The Best of ABBA =

Greatest hits album by ABBA
- Released: August 1975
- Recorded: 1972–1975
- Genre: Pop
- Length: 36:16
- Labels: Polydor (Austria, Germany, India, Netherlands and Norway); RCA owned by Sony Music Entertainment Australia (Australia and New Zealand)
- Producers: Benny Andersson & Björn Ulvaeus

ABBA chronology
ABBA (1975)	The Best of ABBA (1975)	Greatest Hits (1975)

The Best of ABBA is the first compilation greatest hits album released by the Swedish pop group ABBA, in August 1975. It reached number one in New Zealand, Australia, Austria, Germany, and the Netherlands.

== Overview ==
After being released in the Netherlands, The Best of ABBA was then released in West Germany, and then in Australia and New Zealand in November 1975, before being released in Austria and India in 1976. Despite not being released in Norway, imports led the album to chart. After import copies were being sold in Scandinavia, ABBA's Greatest Hits was rush-released there in November 1975. The album topped the charts in Australia, Austria and New Zealand, and went on to be certified 24× Platinum in New Zealand and 22× Platinum in Australia. The album is tied with Dire Straits' album Brothers in Arms for being the best-selling album in New Zealand.

In Australia it spent 16 weeks at number one, and in New Zealand it topped the charts for 18 weeks. The Best of ABBA was one of the biggest selling vinyl albums in Australian history, selling over a million copies. At one stage RCA Records couldn't keep up with the demand for the albums in the country's shops, and copies had to be pressed under license by a rival record company. In both countries, this album charted better than all the other ABBA releases, and it also became the first ever album to be certified gold in Australia before it was even released.

The Best of ABBA was re-released in 1988 on vinyl and CD, but was only available for a short time.

== Track listing ==
All tracks are written by Benny Andersson, Björn Ulvaeus and Stig Anderson, except where noted.

Side one
No.	Title	Writer(s)	Length
1.	"Waterloo"		2:41
2.	"Ring Ring"	Andersson; Anderson; Ulvaeus; Neil Sedaka; Phil Cody	3:01
3.	"Honey, Honey"		2:52
4.	"Mamma Mia"		3:32
5.	"People Need Love"	Andersson; Ulvaeus	2:40
6.	"Nina, Pretty Ballerina"	Andersson; Ulvaeus	2:50

Side two
No.	Title	Writer(s)	Length
1.	"I Do, I Do, I Do, I Do, I Do"		3:15
2.	"SOS"		3:22
3.	"Dance (While the Music Still Goes On)"	Andersson; Ulvaeus	3:12
4.	"Bang-A-Boomerang"		4:00
5.	"Hasta Mañana"		3:05
6.	"So Long"	Andersson; Ulvaeus	3:06
Total length:			36:16

== Personnel ==
- Agnetha Fältskog – lead vocals (8, 9, 11), co-lead vocals (1, 2, 3, 4, 6, 7, 10, 12), backing vocals
- Anni-Frid Lyngstad – co-lead vocals (1, 2, 3, 4, 6, 7, 10, 12), backing vocals
- Björn Ulvaeus – guitar, lead vocals (5), backing vocals
- Benny Andersson – piano, synthesizers, backing vocals

== Charts ==
=== Weekly charts ===
Chart (1975–76)	Peak position
Australian Albums (Kent Music Report)	1
Austrian Albums (Ö3 Austria)	1
Dutch Albums (Album Top 100)	1
German Albums (Offizielle Top 100)	1
New Zealand Albums (RMNZ)	1
Norwegian Albums (VG-lista)	14
Chart (2008)	Peak position
Italian Albums (FIMI)	92

=== Year-end charts ===
Chart (1976)	Position
Australian Albums (Kent Music Report)	1
Austrian Albums (Ö3 Austria)	1
German Albums (Offizielle Top 100)	1
New Zealand Albums (RMNZ)	1
Chart (1977)	Position
German Albums (Offizielle Top 100)	30
Austrian Albums (Ö3 Austria)	23
New Zealand Albums (RMNZ)	18

== Sales and certifications ==
Region	Certification	Certified units/sales
Australia (ARIA)	22× Platinum	1,210,000
Germany (BVMI)	Platinum	500,000^{^}
Hong Kong (IFPI Hong Kong)	Gold	10,000^{*}
India	—	50,000
Netherlands	—	500,000
New Zealand (RMNZ)	24× Platinum	360,000^{^}
^{*} Sales figures based on certification alone.^{^} Shipments figures based on certification alone.

== See also ==
- List of best-selling albums in Australia
- List of best-selling albums in the Netherlands
- List of best-selling albums in New Zealand
