= Greatest Hits (ABBA album) =

1975 compilation album by ABBA

Greatest hits album by ABBA
- Released: 17 November 1975
- Recorded: March 1972 – September 1975
- Genre: Pop
- Length: 48:00
- Labels: Polar (Sweden); Epic (UK); Atlantic (US); Universal (2006 reissue)
- Producers: Benny Andersson; Björn Ulvaeus

ABBA chronology
The Best of ABBA (1975)	Greatest Hits (1975)	Arrival (1976)

Alternative cover
- UK; North American cover

Singles from Greatest Hits
- 1. "Fernando" Released: March 1976

Professional ratings
Review scores
Source	Rating
Christgau's Record Guide	C+
The Encyclopedia of Popular Music	4/5 stars
The Rolling Stone Album Guide	4/5 stars

Greatest Hits is a compilation album by the Swedish pop group ABBA. It was originally released in Scandinavia on 17 November 1975 and in other parts of the world in 1976, notably the UK on 10 April, and on 18 September in the US and Canada. The 1976 version of the album included the band's most recent single "Fernando".

The album was released in response to similar ABBA compilation albums being issued at the time by record labels in other countries. They had licensed ABBA's music for release in their own territories, and there was a threat that the import sales of those compilations would impact ABBA's home market. Therefore, the success of the album was largely confined to Scandinavia and the UK.

Greatest Hits was the best-selling album of 1976 in the UK, and the country's second-best selling album of the decade. It would become one of ABBA's best-selling albums worldwide.

== Background ==
ABBA had won the Eurovision Song Contest in April 1974 with "Waterloo", which became a major hit across Europe, Australia and New Zealand. Since the follow-up singles did not achieve similar success, the interest in the band was reignited a year later when "I Do, I Do, I Do, I Do, I Do", "SOS" and "Mamma Mia" became worldwide hits. To capitalize on this resurgence of interest, several labels around the world released their own licensed compilations of ABBA's singles up to and including "Mamma Mia". Among these were a similarly titled Greatest Hits by France's Disques Vogue, and The Best of ABBA, released by West Germany's division of Polydor Records and by RCA Victor in Australia and New Zealand. To prevent the sale of any of these imported records, ABBA's record label, Polar Music, rush-released their own version of Greatest Hits.

The album's songs were taken from ABBA's first three studio albums: Ring Ring (1973), Waterloo (1974) and ABBA (1975). With the exception of "Dance (While the Music Still Goes On)", they had all been released as singles.

Despite its title, only half of the tracks on Greatest Hits charted in major territories as hit singles. "Waterloo", "SOS", "Mamma Mia" and, later, "Fernando" were top 10 hits in the UK and several countries, though only "Waterloo" became a top 10 hit in the US. Other hits included: "I Do, I Do, I Do, I Do, I Do" (a top 10 hit in several countries, a number one in Australia, and a top 20 hit in the US, though barely cracking the top 40 in the UK); "Honey, Honey" (a top 20 hit in several countries and a top 30 hit in the US); "Hasta Mañana" (a top 10 hit in South Africa and New Zealand and a top 20 hit in Australia); and "So Long" (a top 20 hit in Germany and a top 10 hit in Sweden and Denmark). "Ring Ring" reached number one in Belgium and Sweden, and went top ten in a few other markets. "Nina, Pretty Ballerina" was an A side in only a few territories, reaching number 8 in Austria. "Another Town, Another Train" was a B side in most territories, but reached number 18 in Rhodesia. "People Need Love" was a radio hit in several US regions, but didn't chart higher than No. 114 nationally (on the Cash Box chart). "Bang-A-Boomerang" was an A side in France, where it was a minor hit.

== Release ==
Greatest Hits reached number one in Sweden and in Norway, but lost out in sales in Europe, Australia, and New Zealand due to the already released rival compilations. The UK version of the album was released in April 1976. In the five-month period between the releases of the Scandinavian and UK versions of Greatest Hits, ABBA had achieved their second consecutive (and third overall) UK number-one single with "Fernando". The song was added to the UK release, as well as to reissued albums in Norway and Denmark. In Australia, where several of the songs included on the album had reached number one, the release of Greatest Hits was beaten by The Best of ABBA, the RCA Victor compilation, preventing a release there for years.

Greatest Hits was released in the US and in Canada in September 1976. This North American version of the album omitted "Hasta Mañana" and reorganized the track listing. Sales of the record did not peak until April 1977, when the song "Dancing Queen" reached number one in both countries. "Dancing Queen" was not included on Greatest Hits, but it was the lead single from the new studio album Arrival and it had generated interest in ABBA's back catalogue. Greatest Hits has been certified platinum in the US and quintuple platinum in Canada.

The release of Greatest Hits coincided with the start of ABBA's huge popularity in the UK during the latter half of the 1970s, becoming the first of eight consecutive number-one albums for the group. It spent eleven non-consecutive weeks at the top of the UK Albums Chart and went on to become the best-selling album of 1976 and the second best-selling album of the 1970s. As of July 2016 it is the 46th best-selling album of all time in the UK, with sales of over 2.6 million.

Greatest Hits was an enormous success. Rolling Stone declared of the album: "Anyone who could listen to this record five times and not wind up humming half the songs is an android".

The compilation was released in Brazil, titled ABBA and issued in the ABBA album artwork. ABBA was amongst the best albums released in 1976 in Brazil.

== Artwork ==
The album was issued with two different gatefold covers, based on the country of its release. The painting on the original Scandinavian release was by artist Hans Arnold and had originally been awarded as a prize by Swedish magazine VeckoRevyn to celebrate ABBA being voted "Artists of the Year". The artwork was also used on the European-wide "30th Anniversary Edition" CD reissue, in a miniature replica gatefold album sleeve.

In the UK, North America and some other territories, the cover features a photograph, taken by Bengt H. Malmqvist, of the group sitting on a park bench during an autumn day. Benny and Frida are kissing, while Björn reads a paper and Agnetha looks straight into the camera. The image was used as the inner gatefold picture on the Scandinavian versions. It was also used on the US CD reissue by Atlantic Records in the 1980s, but without the track listing on the front.

== Appearances in other media ==
The British/American version of the album sleeve appears in the popular 2015 science-fiction film The Martian, when the husband of the disco-loving ship commander Melissa Lewis reveals on a video link that he has found an original vinyl copy of the album. The track "Waterloo" also features prominently on the film's soundtrack.

== Track listing ==
The track listing is based on the original European edition of the album (POL 266). All tracks are written by Benny Andersson, Stig Anderson and Björn Ulvaeus, except where noted.

Original pressing (POLS 266) - Side one
No.	Title	Writer(s)	Length
1.	"SOS"		3:22
2.	"He Is Your Brother"	Andersson; Ulvaeus	3:17
3.	"Ring Ring"	Andersson; Anderson; Ulvaeus; Neil Sedaka; Phil Cody	3:03
4.	"Hasta Mañana"		3:09
5.	"Nina, Pretty Ballerina"	Andersson; Ulvaeus	2:52
6.	"Honey, Honey"		2:55
7.	"So Long"	Andersson; Ulvaeus	3:06

Side two
No.	Title	Writer(s)	Length
1.	"I Do, I Do, I Do, I Do, I Do"		3:15
2.	"People Need Love"	Andersson; Ulvaeus	2:43
3.	"Bang-A-Boomerang"		3:02
4.	"Another Town, Another Train"	Andersson; Ulvaeus	3:10
5.	"Mamma Mia"		3:32
6.	"Dance (While the Music Still Goes On)"	Andersson; Ulvaeus	3:05
7.	"Waterloo"		2:42
Total length:			43:45

1976 Reissue (POLSX 266) - Side one
No.	Title	Writer(s)	Length
1.	"Fernando"		4:15
2.	"SOS"		3:22
3.	"He Is Your Brother"	Andersson; Ulvaeus	3:17
4.	"Ring Ring"	Andersson; Anderson; Ulvaeus; Neil Sedaka; Phil Cody	3:03
5.	"Hasta Mañana"		3:09
6.	"Nina, Pretty Ballerina"	Andersson; Ulvaeus	2:52
7.	"Honey, Honey"		2:55
8.	"So Long"	Andersson; Ulvaeus	3:06

Notes

- Later pressings of the album released in 1976 include "Fernando" as either the first track or the last track of the album, depending on the pressing in each country.
- The North American edition of the album was released in 1976. This edition included "Fernando", left out "Hasta Mañana", and reordered the track list.

== Personnel ==
- Agnetha Fältskog – lead vocals (1, 4), co-lead vocals (2–3, 5–14), backing vocals
- Anni-Frid Lyngstad – lead vocals (15), co-lead vocals (2–3, 5–14), backing vocals
- Björn Ulvaeus – lead vocals (11, 13), co-lead vocals (2, 6, 9, 13), steel-string acoustic guitar, backing vocals
- Benny Andersson – synthesizer, keyboards, backing vocals

Additional personnel:

- Janne Kling – flute (15)

== Charts ==
=== Weekly charts ===
Chart (1975–77)	Peak position
Canada Top Albums/CDs (RPM)	2
Finnish Albums (Suomen virallinen lista)	1
Italian Albums (Musica e dischi)	18
Norwegian Albums (VG-lista)	1
Swedish Albums (Sverigetopplistan)	1
UK Albums (Official Charts)	1
US Billboard 200	48
US Cash Box Top 100 Albums	59
US Record World Albums	59

=== Year-end charts ===
Chart (1976)	Position
UK Albums (OCC)	1
Chart (1977)	Position
Canada Top Albums/CDs (RPM)	13
UK Albums (OCC)	9

=== Decade-end charts ===
Chart (1970–79)	Position
UK Albums (OCC)	2

== Certifications and sales ==
Region	Certification	Certified units/sales
Australia	—	900,000
Canada (Music Canada)	5× Platinum	600,000
Denmark	—	250,000
Finland (Musiikkituottajat)	Platinum	64,875
France	—	100,000
Germany (BVMI)	Gold	250,000^{^}
Greece (IFPI Greece)	Gold	50,000^{^}
Hong Kong (IFPI Hong Kong)	Platinum	20,000^{*}
Ireland	—	200,000
Israel	Gold	20,000
Japan	—	330,000
Malta	—	3,000
Norway (IFPI Norway)	Gold	25,000^{*}
Sweden (GLF)	Platinum	293,163
Taiwan	—	4,500
United Kingdom (BPI)	8× Platinum	2,606,000
United States (RIAA)	Platinum	1,000,000^{^}
Yugoslavia	Gold	35,000
Summaries
Worldwide	—	6,000,000
^{*} Sales figures based on certification alone.^{^} Shipments figures based on certification alone.

== See also ==
- Music of Sweden
