= List of year-end number-one albums (New Zealand) =

This is a list of year-end number-one albums for New Zealand. Recorded Music NZ publishes the country's official weekly record charts.

== Number-one albums ==
Key
† – Album of New Zealand origin

Year	Artist	Title	Certification (Note: The certification is for total cumulative sales to the end of that year.)	Weeks on chart (Note: The number of weeks given is the number of weeks that the album spent on the chart that year.)	Weeks at number one (Note: The number of weeks given is the number of weeks that the album spent at number one that year.)	References
1975	Pink Floyd	The Dark Side of the Moon		34	0 (Note: The Dark Side of the Moon peaked at No.3 in 1975. It reached No.1 in 1993, where it spent one week.)	
1976	ABBA	The Best of ABBA		45	18	
1977	Fleetwood Mac	Rumours		41	7	
1978	Bee Gees and various artists	Saturday Night Fever		38	15	
1979	Supertramp	Breakfast in America	Platinum	35	10	
1980	Pink Floyd	The Wall	Platinum	45	9	
1981	Dire Straits	Making Movies	Platinum	48	0 (Note: Making Movies peaked at No.3 in 1981, for one week.)	
1982	Men at Work	Business as Usual	Platinum	45	10	
1983	David Bowie	Let's Dance	Platinum	34	8	
1984	Billy Joel	An Innocent Man	Platinum	46	3	
1985	Bruce Springsteen	Born in the U.S.A.	Platinum	47	14	
1986	Dire Straits	Brothers in Arms	Platinum	48	15	
1987	U2	The Joshua Tree	Platinum	38	8	
1988	Original London cast	Phantom of the Opera	Platinum	48	5	
1989	Tracy Chapman	Crossroads	Platinum	9	7	
1990	The Carpenters	Their Greatest Hits	Platinum	24	7	
1991	Eurythmics	Greatest Hits	—	27	8	
1992	Various artists	The Commitments	Platinum	32	1	
1993	Eric Clapton	Unplugged	Platinum	50	5	
1994	Ace of Base	Happy Nation	Platinum	35	5	
1995	The Cranberries	No Need to Argue	Platinum	50	4	
1996	Alanis Morissette	Jagged Little Pill	Platinum	50	11	
1997	Various artists	Romeo + Juliet	Platinum	32	9	
1998	Bee Gees	One Night Only	Platinum	12	4	
1999	Shania Twain	Come on Over	Platinum x15	50	23	
2000	Moby	Play	Platinum x6	49	6	
2001	Linkin Park	Hybrid Theory	Platinum x3	45	1	
2002	Norah Jones	Come Away With Me	Platinum x4	40	2	
2003	Bic Runga	Beautiful Collision	Platinum x8	49	7	
2004	Brooke Fraser	What to Do with Daylight	Platinum x6	49	2	
2005	James Blunt	Back to Bedlam	Platinum x4	23	6	
2006	Fat Freddy's Drop	Based on a True Story	Platinum x7	50	3	
2007	Led Zeppelin	Mothership	Platinum x3	7	7	
2008	Billy T James	The Comic Genius of Billy T James	Platinum x3	4	3	
2009	Susan Boyle	I Dreamed a Dream	Platinum x9	5	5	
2010	Susan Boyle	The Gift	Platinum x3	5	5	
2011	Adele	21	Platinum x8	48	26	
2012	Adele	21	Platinum x11	52	12	
2013	Sol3 Mio	Sol3 Mio	Platinum x5	6	6	
2014	Ed Sheeran	X	Platinum x3	27	6	
2015	Adele	25	Platinum x7	5	5	
2016	Adele	25	Platinum x7	52	5	

== See also ==
- List of best-selling albums in New Zealand
