= I Do, I Do, I Do, I Do, I Do =

- Danish picture sleeve

Single by ABBA

from the album ABBA
- B-side: "Rock Me"; "Bang-a-Boomerang" (US)
- Released: 10 April 1975
- Genre: Pop rock; rock and roll; schlager
- Length: 3:18
- Label: Polar
- Songwriters: Benny Andersson; Björn Ulvaeus; Stig Anderson
- Producers: Benny Andersson; Björn Ulvaeus

ABBA singles chronology
"I've Been Waiting for You" (1974)	"I Do, I Do, I Do, I Do, I Do" (1975)	"Bang-A-Boomerang" (1975)

Music video
- "I Do, I Do, I Do, I Do, I Do" on YouTube

"I Do, I Do, I Do, I Do, I Do" is a song recorded by the Swedish pop music group ABBA for their eponymous third studio album (1975). It was written by Benny Andersson, Björn Ulvaeus, and their manager Stig Anderson, with Andersson and Ulvaeus producing. Agnetha Fältskog and Anni-Frid Lyngstad sing lead vocals. It was released on 10 April 1975 as the album's third single by Polar Music. The song takes inspiration from the European schlager music of the 1950's to the 1970s, as well as the saxophone sound of the 1950's American orchestra leader Billy Vaughn. They were to repeat the style one more time, with "Why Did It Have to Be Me?" on the next studio album, 1976's Arrival.

Despite mixed to negative critical reception, the single proved a surprise success for the group following the dismal success of previous singles, reaching the top ten in ten countries. Most notably, it was the group's first number one hit in Australia, and the start of a 14-week run atop the Kent Music Report chart; "I Do, I Do, I Do, I Do, I Do" spent three weeks atop, "Mamma Mia" ten weeks, and "SOS" one week. It also became the group's third top-twenty hit on the US Billboard Hot 100. A notable exception to the song's success was in the United Kingdom, where it just barely cracked the UK top 40.

== History ==
After the release of "Waterloo", ABBA were having difficulty establishing themselves as an act with longevity. "I Do, I Do, I Do, I Do, I Do" put ABBA firmly back in the spotlight in many territories. With a rousing saxophone tune and homage to schlager music and aforementioned Billy Vaughn, "I Do, I Do, I Do, I Do, I Do" was a significant improvement for the group on the international charts, although it made little impact in Britain. The song's popularity was boosted (particularly in Australia) by the release of a promotional film shown on television.

"I Do, I Do, I Do, I Do, I Do" was first released in the middle of March in the Netherlands as the group had embarked on a promotional tour on 3-4 March 1975. During this promotional tour, the group performed the song on The Eddy Go Round Show, broadcast on 6 March, and TopPop broadcast on 18 April 1975. With the Eurovision Song Contest 1975 approaching, ABBA had to withstand comparisons to Dutch group Teach-in. The music video had the members disappearing and singing to each other.

Björn Ulvaeus would later say in a August 1975 interview with Record Mirror that the song was chosen over "SOS" as a single because "it is as you [interviewer Jan Iles] say, a very commercial record and one which stands a better chance of making the charts," even though Ulvaeus much preferred the latter song.

== Critical reception ==
British trade magazines responded much harsher to the single than American trade magazines. Reviewing for Melody Maker, Colin Irwin panned the single, calling it "so bad it hurts." Ray Fox-Cumming for Record Mirror gave a mediocre review, describing it as a "jaunty sing-a-long thing sounding like a tinny New Seekers with a buxom piano-based backing." Michael Hann of The Guardian ranked the single second to last in the publication's ranking of all of the group's UK singles, offering it as proof that ABBA were "far from an infallible singles band."

American publications were however nicer to the track. Cash Box said "richly textured vocals give this fifties sounding shuffle an extra push, push, push, push" and praised the "excellent horn riff." Record World said that "this single should be the one to finally make people sit up and take note" of ABBA in the US.

== Commercial reception ==
"I Do, I Do, I Do, I Do, I Do" was a notable hit in a number of countries, and was the song that sparked "ABBA-mania" in Australia, becoming ABBA's first chart-topper there. With "Mamma Mia" and "SOS" to follow, this gave the group a run of 14 consecutive weeks at the top of the Australian charts. "I Do, I Do, I Do, I Do, I Do" also topped the charts in France, New Zealand, Switzerland and South Africa and hit the Top 5 in Norway, Belgium, the Netherlands, Austria and Rhodesia (all in 1975). The song also reached No. 15 in the United States in early 1976. A notable exception to the song's success was in the UK Singles Chart, a market that ABBA was aiming to conquer. Although it did return them to the Top 40 (after their previous UK single "So Long" had failed to chart), it stalled at No. 38. Thus, the musical direction taken in the song was not used again for some time. This marked the only time that an ABBA song had more success in the United States than in Britain. Later in 1975, ABBA found success in the UK with "SOS", which cemented the group's success in Australia and elsewhere.

== Track listing ==
Standard 7-inch single

1. "I Do, I Do, I Do, I Do, I Do" – 3:15
2. "Rock Me" – 3:03

US and Canadian 7-inch single

1. "I Do, I Do, I Do, I Do, I Do" – 3:15
2. "Bang-A-Boomerang" – 3:01

Netherlands and Polish 7-inch single

1. "I Do, I Do, I Do, I Do, I Do" – 3:15
2. "So Long" – 3:09

Brazilian 7-inch single

1. "I Do, I Do, I Do, I Do, I Do" – 3:14
2. "Fernando" – 4:06

== Personnel ==
ABBA

- Agnetha Fältskog – lead and backing vocals
- Anni-Frid Lyngstad – lead and backing vocals
- Björn Ulvaeus – backing vocals, rhythm guitar
- Benny Andersson – backing vocals, keyboards

Additional musicians and production staff

- Lasse Wellander – lead guitar
- Mike Watson – bass
- Roger Palm – drums
- Ulf Andersson – alto saxophone

== Charts ==
=== Weekly charts ===
Weekly chart performance for "I Do, I Do, I Do, I Do, I Do"
Chart (1975–1976)	Peak position
Australia (Kent Music Report)	1
Austria (Ö3 Austria Top 40)	4
Belgium (Ultratop 50 Flanders)	2
Belgium (Ultratop 50 Wallonia)	1
Canada (Steede Report)	12
Canada Adult Contemporary (RPM)	6
Canada Top Singles (RPM)	14
Finland (Suomen virallinen singlelista)	25
France (IFOP)	4
Netherlands (Dutch Top 40)	3
Netherlands (Single Top 100)	3
New Zealand (Recorded Music NZ)	1
Norway (VG-lista)	2
Rhodesia (Lyons Maid)	5
South Africa (Springbok)	1
Switzerland (Schweizer Hitparade)	1
UK Singles (Official Charts)	38
US Adult Contemporary (Billboard)	8
US Billboard Hot 100	15
US Cash Box Top 100	19
US Pop/Adult (Radio & Records)	9
US Top 40 (Radio & Records)	17
US Record World Singles	21
West Germany (GfK)	6

=== Year-end charts ===
Annual chart rankings for "I Do, I Do, I Do, I Do, I Do"
Chart (1975)	Position
Australia (Kent Music Report)	13
Belgium (Ultratop 50 Flanders)	11
France (IFOP)	45
Netherlands (Dutch Top 40)	38
Netherlands (Single Top 100)	41
New Zealand (Recorded Music NZ)	6
South Africa (Springbok)	12
Switzerland (Schweizer Hitparade)	7
West Germany (Official German Charts)	28

Chart (1976)	Position
Canada Top Singles (RPM)	132
US (Joel Whitburn's Pop Annual)	120
US Cash Box Top 100	95
US Pop/Adult (Radio & Records)	56

== Certifications and sales ==
Region	Certification	Certified units/sales
France	—	500,000
United Kingdom (BPI) Sales since 2017	Silver	200,000^{‡}
Summaries
Worldwide	—	2,500,000
^{‡} Sales+streaming figures based on certification alone.

== Release history ==
Region	Date	Title	Label	Format	Catalog	Reference
Netherlands	Mar 1975	"I Do, I Do, I Do, I Do, I Do" / "So Long"	Polydor	7-inch vinyl	2001 577	
France, Belgium	Mar 1975	"I Do, I Do, I Do, I Do, I Do" / "Rock Me"	Vogue	7-inch vinyl	45. X. 12077	
UK	4 Apr 1975	"I Do, I Do, I Do, I Do, I Do" / "Rock Me"	Epic	7-inch vinyl	S EPC 3229	
Denmark, Norway	12 Apr 1975	"I Do, I Do, I Do, I Do, I Do" / "Rock Me"	Polar	7-inch vinyl	POS 1207	
Italy	21 April 1975	"I Do, I Do, I Do, I Do, I Do" / "Rock Me"	Dig-It International Records	7-inch vinyl	DG 1115	
Austria, Portugal, Switzerland, West Germany	Apr 1975	"I Do, I Do, I Do, I Do, I Do" / "Rock Me"	Polydor	7-inch vinyl	2001 579	
Australia, New Zealand	Apr 1975	"I Do, I Do, I Do, I Do, I Do" / "Rock Me"	RCA Victor	7-inch vinyl	102607	
New Zealand	Apr 1975	"I Do, I Do, I Do, I Do, I Do" / "Rock Me"	Family	7-inch vinyl	FAY 1105	
Mexico	May 1975	"I Do, I Do, I Do, I Do, I Do" / "Rock Me"	RCA Victor	7-inch vinyl	SP-4246	
Yugoslavia	1 Jun 1975	"I Do, I Do, I Do, I Do, I Do" / "Rock Me"	PGP RTB	7-inch vinyl	S 53 867	
Greece	1975	"I Do, I Do, I Do, I Do, I Do" / "Rock Me"	Pan-Vox	7-inch vinyl	PAN 7592	
South Africa, Rhodesia, Madagascar	1975	"I Do, I Do, I Do, I Do, I Do" / "Rock Me"	Sunshine	7-inch vinyl	GBS 105	
Bolivia	1975	"I Do, I Do, I Do, I Do, I Do" / "Rock Me"	RCA Victor	7-inch vinyl	BOC/S - 1100	
El Salvador	1975	"I Do, I Do, I Do, I Do, I Do" / "Mamma Mia"	RCA Victor	7-inch vinyl	XYPBO-776	
Poland	1975	"I Do, I Do, I Do, I Do, I Do" / "So Long"	Polskie Nagrania Muza	7-inch vinyl	S-634	
USA, Canada	10 Dec 1975	"I Do, I Do, I Do, I Do, I Do" / "Bang-A-Boomerang"	Atlantic	7-inch vinyl	45-3310	
USA	10 Dec 1975	"I Do, I Do, I Do, I Do, I Do" / "I Do, I Do, I Do, I Do, I Do"	Atlantic	7-inch vinyl, promo	45-3310	
Brazil	1976	"I Do, I Do, I Do, I Do, I Do" / "Fernando"	RCA Victor	7-inch vinyl	101.8048	
