= Fernando (song) =

1975 ABBA song

- Norwegian picture sleeve

Single by Anni-Frid Lyngstad

from the album Frida ensam
- Language: Swedish
- B-side: "Ett liv i solen"
- Released: January 1976
- Length: 4:14
- Label: Polar Music
- Songwriters: Benny Andersson; Björn Ulvaeus; Stig Anderson
- Producers: Benny Andersson; Björn Ulvaeus

Anni-Frid Lyngstad singles chronology
"Man Vill Ju Leva Lite Dessemellan" (1972)	"Fernando" (1976)	"I Know There's Something Going On" (1982)

Audio video
- "Fernando" (Swedish version) on YouTube

"Fernando"
- Scandinavian variant of standard artwork

Single by ABBA

from the album Greatest Hits
- B-side: "Hey, Hey Helen"
- Released: 12 March 1976
- Recorded: 4 September 1975
- Studio: Metronome
- Genre: Pop; schlager
- Length: 4:15
- Label: Polar
- Songwriters: Benny Andersson; Björn Ulvaeus; Stig Anderson
- Producers: Benny Andersson; Björn Ulvaeus

ABBA singles chronology
"Rock Me" (1976)	"Fernando" (1976)	"Dancing Queen" (1976)

Music video
- "Fernando" on YouTube

"Fernando" is a song written by ABBA members Benny Andersson and Björn Ulvaeus, and their manager Stikkan Anderson. It was originally recorded for their fellow group member Anni-Frid Lyngstad, who included it on her second album Frida ensam (1975). Anderson wrote the Swedish lyrics to Lyngstad's version. It was released in January 1976 via Polar Music as a radio-only single in Sweden and a physical release in Norway.

In 1976, ABBA would later re-record "Fernando", with re-written English lyrics provided by Ulvaeus. This version was released on 12 March 1976, initially as a standalone single, but was later included on re-issues of their 1975 compilation album Greatest Hits, as well as the Australasian version of their fourth studio album Arrival (1976). It is also included on ABBA Gold.

Both versions of "Fernando" would become major successes in their own right. Lyngstad's Swedish version spent nine weeks atop the important Svensktoppen radio chart, and was voted the favorite song of the year. ABBA's English version would become one of their best-selling hits of all time, selling six million copies alone in 1976, and most notably spent a then record breaking 14 weeks atop the Australian Kent Music Report chart. It is one of fewer than forty singles to have sold at least 10 million physical copies worldwide.

== Background ==
"Fernando" was not originally released as an ABBA song but as a solo single by band member Anni-Frid Lyngstad. It was featured on her No. 1 Swedish solo album Frida ensam (1975). The song was composed by Benny Andersson and Björn Ulvaeus and carried the working title of "Tango". Preparations for recording began in August 1975. The writers made last-minute changes to the title before recording. The name "Fernando" was inspired by a bartender of that name who worked at a club the band frequented in Stockholm, Sweden. The beach and campfire setting for the music video was inspired by the band after visiting Ayr Beach in South Ayrshire, Scotland.

For ABBA's version of "Fernando", Anni-Frid Lyngstad is the sole vocalist for approximately the first minute of the finished recording. Thereafter, she is joined by Agnetha Fältskog who sings with her in harmony for the rest of the song.

== Swedish-language version ==
The original Swedish-language version's lyrics were written by ABBA's manager Stig Anderson, and differ substantially from the English-language version. In the original, the narrator tries to console the heartbroken Fernando, who has lost his great love.

== English-language version ==
The English version, with completely different lyrics by Björn Ulvaeus, presents a vision of nostalgia for two veterans reminiscing in old age about a long-ago battle in which they participated. "I wrote all the songs as little stories. 'Fernando' was about two old freedom-fighters from the Mexican Revolution. I was lying outside one summer night, looking at the stars and it suddenly came to me". "I knew that the title 'Fernando' had to be there, and after pondering a while, I had this vivid image in my mind of two old and scarred revolutionaries in Mexico sitting outside at night talking about old memories".

The B-side to "Fernando" was the song "Hey, Hey, Helen", a track from the group's third album ABBA (1975), although in some countries other tracks from the album were used instead, namely "Tropical Loveland", "Rock Me" or "Dance (While the Music Still Goes On)".

== Spanish-language version ==
The title and rhythm of the song made it an obvious choice for inclusion on ABBA's Spanish album, Gracias Por La Música. The lyrics were translated into Spanish by Mary McCluskey and recorded at Polar Music Studio on 3 January 1980. The song was released as a promotional single in Spain.

== Reception ==
=== Critical ===
Sue Byrom of Record Mirror praised the record, saying that "after the instant commerciality of their last couple of singles, [the group] have slowed the pace down a bit with this one: Much quieter delivery and slower tempo." Record World called the song "a classic!"

=== Commercial ===
"Fernando" was released in March 1976 and became one of ABBA's best-selling singles, topping the charts in at least 13 countries, and selling over 10 million copies worldwide. It was the longest-running No. 1 in Australian history (spending fourteen weeks at the top and forty weeks on the chart), and remained so for over forty years, until it was surpassed by Ed Sheeran's "Shape of You", which achieved fifteen weeks at No. 1 in May 2017. Prior to 1997, it was Australia's highest-selling single. "Fernando" also reached the top of the charts in Austria, Belgium, France, West Germany, the United Kingdom, Hungary, Ireland, the Netherlands, New Zealand, South Africa and Switzerland. It was also a Top 5 hit in ABBA's native Sweden (although Lyngstad's version was No. 1 on Sweden's radio chart for nine weeks), Finland, Norway, Spain, Canada and Rhodesia.

The track became ABBA's fourth Top 20 hit on the U.S. Billboard Hot 100, peaking at No. 13. It also reached No. 1 on the Billboard Adult Contemporary chart, the first of two chart-toppers for ABBA on this chart (the second being "The Winner Takes It All"). The song remains an airplay staple on American radio stations specializing in the MOR, adult standards and easy listening formats.

"Fernando" was the fourth-biggest single of 1976 in the UK. It spent 10 weeks in the UK Top 10 (more than any other ABBA single), and was also the second of three consecutive UK No. 1 singles for ABBA, after "Mamma Mia" and before "Dancing Queen". As of September 2021, it is ABBA's sixth-biggest song in the UK with 903,000 chart sales (pure sales and digital streams).

In Portugal the single sold 80,000 copies; in France it went to No. 1 and sold 850,000 copies.

== In popular culture ==
The song was featured in season 1 episode 7 "That Disco Episode" of That '70s Show.

In 2000, the song was featured in season one finale of Malcolm in the Middle titled "Waterpark", where Dewey (Erik Per Sullivan) dances with Mrs. White (Bea Arthur) to this song.

In 2010, the song was featured, but not credited, in the sixth episode of the second season of Community, titled "Epidemiology", wherein several ABBA songs are stuck on loop over the intercom system during a zombie attack. It is the final song, played as the infection is subdued and the zombies recover.

In 2025, the song was featured in the second episode of the final and fifth season of Stranger Things, titled "The Vanishing of Holly Wheeler".

In the 2025 US college football season, the song became a common sound at Indiana Hoosiers football games in honor of Heisman Trophy winner Fernando Mendoza. The Indiana University Marching Hundred played an arrangement of the song throughout the 2025 football season in honor of Mendoza. Indiana University won its first-ever college football national championship by defeating the Miami Hurricanes 27-21 in the 2025-26 College Football Playoff National Championship game on January 19, 2026. The Hoosiers finished an undefeated 16-0 season, marking a historic achievement for the program under coach Curt Cignetti.

== Charts ==
=== Anni-Frid Lyngstad version ===
Weekly chart performance for "Fernando" (Swedish Version)
Chart (1976)	Peak position
Sweden (Svensktoppen)	1

Year-end chart performance for "Fernando" (Swedish Version)
Chart (1976)	Position
Sweden (Svensktoppen)	1

=== Weekly charts ===
Weekly chart performance for "Fernando"
Chart (1976)	Peak position
Australia (Kent Music Report)	1
Austria (Ö3 Austria Top 40)	1
Belgium (Ultratop 50 Flanders)	1
Brazil (IBOPE)	9
Canada (Steede Report)	2
Canada Top Singles (RPM)	4
Canada Adult Contemporary (RPM)	1
Denmark (IFPI)	4
Finland (Seura and Help magazine)	5
France (IFOP)	3
France (SNEP)	2
Ireland (IRMA)	1
Italy (Musica e dischi)	3
Netherlands (Dutch Top 40)	1
Netherlands (Single Top 100)	1
New Zealand (Recorded Music NZ)	1
Norway (VG-lista)	2
Portugal (AFP)	1
Rhodesia (Rhodesian Singles Chart)	2
South Africa (Springbok Radio)	1
Spain (El Gran Musical)	4
Sweden (Sverigetopplistan)	2
Switzerland (Schweizer Hitparade)	1
UK Singles (Official Charts)	1
US Billboard Hot 100	13
US Adult Contemporary (Billboard)	1
US Cash Box Top 100	10
West Germany (GfK)	1

=== Year-end charts ===
Year-end chart performance for "Fernando"
Chart (1976)	Rank
Australia (Kent Music Report)	1
Belgium (Ultratop Flanders)	1
Canada Top Singles (RPM)	61
France (IFOP)	9
Netherlands (Dutch Top 40)	7
Netherlands (Single Top 100)	9
New Zealand (Recorded Music NZ)	1
South Africa (Springbok Radio)	5
Switzerland (Schweizer Hitparade)	2
UK Singles (Music Week)	7
US Easy Listening (Billboard)	20

Chart (2016-2020)	Peak position
UK Physical Singles (OCC)	2
UK Vinyl Singles (OCC)	2

Chart (2026)	Peak position
US Dance Digital Song Sales (Billboard)	3

== Sales and certifications ==
Region	Certification	Certified units/sales
Australia	—	720,000
Austria	—	2,000
Brazil	—	200,000
Canada (Music Canada)	Gold	75,000^{^}
France (SNEP)	Gold	500,000^{*}
Germany (BVMI)	Gold	600,000
Ireland (IRMA)	Gold	7,500
Kenya	—	10,000
New Zealand (RMNZ)	Platinum	30,000^{‡}
Portugal	—	80,000
United Kingdom (BPI)	Gold	1,000,000
Yugoslavia	Gold	100,000
Summaries
Worldwide	—	10,000,000
^{*} Sales figures based on certification alone.^{^} Shipments figures based on certification alone.^{‡} Sales+streaming figures based on certification alone.

== Release history ==
Region	Date	Title	Label	Format	Catalog
Swedish version (Frida)
Sweden	Oct 1975	"Fernando" / "Ett liv i solen"	Polar	7-inch vinyl, promo	POS 1221
Norway	Jan 1976	"Fernando" / "Ett liv i solen"	Polar	7-inch vinyl	POS 1221
English version (ABBA)
Australia, New Zealand	8 Mar 1976	"Fernando" / "Tropical Loveland"	RCA Victor	7-inch vinyl	102746
UK	14 Mar 1976	"Fernando" / "Hey, Hey Helen"	Epic	7-inch vinyl	S EPC 4036
Austria, Netherlands, Switzerland, Philippines, West Germany	Mar 1976	"Fernando" / "Tropical Loveland"	Polydor	7-inch vinyl	2001 639
Spain	Mar 1976	"Fernando" / "Intermezzo no.1"	Carnaby	7-inch vinyl	MO 1582
Scandinavia	12 Apr 1976	"Fernando" / "Hey, Hey Helen"	Polar	7-inch vinyl	POS 1224
France	Apr 1976	"Fernando" / "Dance (While the Music Still Goes On)"	Melba	7-inch vinyl	140062
Yugoslavia	Apr 1976	"Fernando" / "Tropical Loveland"	PGP RTB	7-inch vinyl	S 53 939
Italy	5 May 1976	"Fernando" / "Tropical Loveland"	Dig-It International Records	7-inch vinyl	DG 1131
Mexico	May 1976	"Fernando" / "Mamma Mia"	RCA Victor	7-inch vinyl	SP-4570
Canada, USA	Aug 1976	"Fernando" / "Rock Me"	Atlantic	7-inch vinyl	3346
USA	Aug 1976	"Fernando" / "Fernando"	Atlantic	7-inch vinyl, promo	3346
Japan	Sep 1976	"Fernando" / "Tropical Loveland"	Discomate	7-inch vinyl	DSP-107
Greece	1976	"Fernando" / "Hey, Hey Helen"	Pan-Vox	7-inch vinyl	7595
Kenya	1976	"Fernando" / "Hey, Hey Helen"	Polydor	7-inch vinyl	2001 639
Portugal, Hong Kong	1976	"Fernando" / "Hey, Hey Helen"	Polydor	7-inch vinyl	2001 648
Argentina	1976	"Fernando" / "Hey, Hey Helen"	RCA Victor	7-inch vinyl	31A-2661
Bolivia	1976	"Fernando" / "Hey, Hey Helen"	RCA Victor	7-inch vinyl	BOCS 1127
Chile, Peru	1976	"Fernando" / "Hey, Hey Helen"	RCA Victor	7-inch vinyl	POS 1224
Colombia	1976	"Fernando" / "Hey, Hey Helen"	RCA Victor	7-inch vinyl	51-51831
Dominican Republic	1976	"Fernando" / "Hey, Hey Helen"	RCA Victor	7-inch vinyl	DRK 9089
Ecuador	1976	"Fernando" / "Hey, Hey Helen"	RCA Victor	7-inch vinyl	ECK-200481
Panama	1976	"Fernando" / "Hey, Hey Helen"	RCA Victor	7-inch vinyl	XAPBO-717
Uruguay	1976	"Fernando" / "Hey, Hey Helen"	RCA Victor	7-inch vinyl	33 UR 510
El Salvador	1976	"Fernando" / "Hasta Mañana"	RCA Victor	7-inch vinyl	XYPBO-806
Jamaica	1976	"Fernando" / "Rock Me"	Dynamic Sounds	7-inch vinyl	D 106
Mex	1976			7-inch vinyl	
Turkey	1976	"Fernando" / "Tropical Loveland"	Balet	7-inch vinyl	BE 187
South Africa, Rhodesia, Madagascar	1976	"Fernando" / "Tropical Loveland"	Sunshine, EMI	7-inch vinyl	GBS 114
Venezuela	1976	"Fernando" / "Tropical Loveland"	RCA Victor	7-inch vinyl	45-685
USA	1979	"Fernando" / "Dancing Queen"	Atlantic (Golden Oldies)	7-inch vinyl, reissue	OS-13203
Japan	Apr 1980	"Fernando" / "Tropical Loveland"	Discomate	7-inch vinyl, reissue	DSP-153
Netherlands	1986	"Fernando" / "Dancing Queen"	BR Music	7-inch vinyl, reissue	45193
Germany	1987	"Fernando" / "Tropical Loveland"	Polydor (Hit Come Back)	7-inch vinyl, reissue	887 193
Europe	7 Oct 2016	"Fernando" / "Hey, Hey Helen"	Polar	7-inch vinyl, picture disc	4795077
Worldwide	10 Apr 2026	"Fernando" (Dolby Atmos)	Polar	Streaming	
Spanish version (ABBA)
USA	1980	"Fernando" / "Al Andar"	Discos CBS International	7-inch vinyl	DAS 40002
Argentina	1981	"Fernando" / " Conociendome, Conociendote"	RCA Victor	7-inch vinyl	S-0138

== Cher version ==
"Fernando"

Single by Cher

from the album Mamma Mia! Here We Go Again: The Movie Soundtrack and Dancing Queen
- Released: 21 June 2018
- Recorded: 2017
- Studio: Mono Music Studios (Stockholm, Sweden)
- Genre: Pop
- Length: 3:59
- Label: Capitol (US); Polydor (worldwide); Warner Bros.
- Songwriters: Benny Andersson; Björn Ulvaeus; Stig Anderson
- Producer: Benny Andersson

Cher singles chronology
"Ooga Boo" (2017)	"Fernando" (2018)	"Gimme! Gimme! Gimme! (A Man After Midnight)" (2018)

Licensed audio
- "Cher, Andy Garcia - Fernando (Audio)" on YouTube

Licensed audio
- "Cher - Fernando [Official HD Audio]" on YouTube

American singer and actress Cher recorded "Fernando," which was released as the third single from the movie soundtrack of Mamma Mia! Here We Go Again. Her version was released on 21 June 2018, by Capitol and Polydor Records. Produced by Benny Andersson, the song debuted on the Billboard Adult Contemporary chart in July 2018 at number 22. This cover version features background vocals by actor Andy Garcia and also references the Mexico–Guatemala conflict of 1959, part of which had been seen by Cher's character, Ruby Sheridan, Donna's mother, along with her long lost love, Fernando Cienfuegos. Cher's solo cover version without background vocals by García appears on her 2018 ABBA tribute album Dancing Queen.

=== Live performances ===
Cher performed "Fernando" at the CinemaCon 2018 to promote the Mamma Mia! Here We Go Again film. During her Here We Go Again Tour she also performs the song together with "Waterloo" and "SOS". On 31 October 2018 "The Shoop Shoop Song (It's in His Kiss)" and "Take Me Home" were cut from her Classic Cher concert residency and "Waterloo", "SOS" and "Fernando" were added.

=== Track listings and formats ===
==== Digital download ====
- "Fernando" (feat. Andy García) – 3:59
- "Fernando" (solo version) – 3:57

=== Charts and certifications ===
Weekly chart performance for "Fernando"
Chart (2018)	Peak position
Hungary (Single Top 40)	26
Scottish Singles Sales (Official Charts)	24
UK Singles (Official Charts)	92
US Adult Contemporary (Billboard)	22

Certifications for "Fernando"
Region	Certification	Certified units/sales
United Kingdom (BPI)	Silver	200,000^{‡}
^{‡} Sales+streaming figures based on certification alone.
