= List of best-selling albums in Australia =

This is a list of best-selling albums in Australia that have been certified by the Australian Recording Industry Association (ARIA). Since the 1970s, ARIA certified an album platinum for a shipment of 50,000 copies across Australia. In 1983, the number of copies required for a platinum album was raised to 70,000 copies. All albums in this list released after 1982 must have won at least ten ARIA Platinum Awards (700,000 copies) or fourteen awards (700,000 copies) if released before 1983. This list is primarily based on the ARIA database, so it does not include some of the albums which were best-sellers before ARIA began tracking records.

According to ARIA certifications, Bat Out of Hell by Meat Loaf is the best-selling album of all time in Australia, with twenty-six times platinum. Come On Over by Shania Twain is the second-best-selling album and the best-selling album by a female solo artist with twenty-five times platinum. Whispering Jack by John Farnham is the third-best-selling album and best-selling album for any local artist, with twenty-four times platinum. Gold: Greatest Hits by ABBA is the best-selling compilation album ever with eighteen times platinum. Finally, Madonna's The Immaculate Collection is the best-selling compilation album in solo artist category. All of these records (except for the third-best-selling album of all time) are held by foreign artists. The highest-selling album by an Australian female solo artist is Delta Goodrem's debut Innocent Eyes, with fifteen times platinum.

== Gold and Platinum certification awards (Timeline) ==
Albums

Certification	Until 1983	Since 1983	Since 2015
Gold	20,000	35,000	no change
Platinum	50,000	70,000	no change
Diamond	–	–	500,000

== Best-selling albums in Australia ==
Listing is sorted by certified sales and by release year.

No.	Year	Album	Artist	Nationality	Award	Sales	Source
1	1977	Bat Out of Hell	Meat Loaf	US	26× Platinum	1,820,000	
2	1997	Come On Over	Shania Twain	Canada	25× Platinum	1,750,000	
3	1986	Whispering Jack	John Farnham	Australia	24× Platinum	1,680,000	
4	2002	The Eminem Show	Eminem	US	19× Platinum	1,330,000	
5	1992; 2014	Gold: Greatest Hits; Gold: Greatest Hits (40th Anniversary Edition)	ABBA	Sweden	17× Platinum; 1× Platinum	1,260,000	
6	1982	Thriller	Michael Jackson	US	17× Platinum	1,190,000	
6	1985	Brothers in Arms	Dire Straits	UK	17× Platinum	1,190,000	
6	2011	21	Adele	UK	17× Platinum	1,190,000	
9	1975	The Best of ABBA	ABBA	Sweden	22× Platinum	1,100,000	
10	1981	Greatest Hits	Queen	UK	15× Platinum	1,050,000	
10	2003	Innocent Eyes	Delta Goodrem	Australia	15× Platinum	1,050,000	
12	1995	Jagged Little Pill	Alanis Morissette	Canada	14× Platinum	1,035,000	
13	2011	Christmas	Michael Bublé	Canada	2× Diamond	1,000,000	
14	1973	The Dark Side of the Moon	Pink Floyd	UK	14× Platinum	980,000	
14	1978	Grease: The Original Soundtrack from the Motion Picture	Olivia Newton-John, John Travolta & Various Artists	Various	14× Platinum	980,000	
14	1984	Born in the U.S.A.	Bruce Springsteen	US	14× Platinum	980,000	
14	1993	So Far So Good	Bryan Adams	Canada	14× Platinum	980,000	
14	1990	The Immaculate Collection	Madonna	US	14× Platinum	980,000	
19	1994	Cross Road	Bon Jovi	US	13× Platinum	910,000	
19	1996	Falling into You	Celine Dion	Canada	13× Platinum	910,000	
19	1996	Recurring Dream − The Very Best of Crowded House	Crowded House	New Zealand / Australia	13× Platinum	910,000	
19	1977	Rumours	Fleetwood Mac	UK / US	13× Platinum	910,000	
19	1991	Metallica	Metallica	US	13× Platinum	910,000	
19	2008	Funhouse	Pink	US	13× Platinum	910,000	
25	1976	Arrival	ABBA	Sweden	18× Platinum	900,000	
26	1980	Back in Black	AC/DC	Australia	12× Platinum	840,000	
26	1993	Music Box	Mariah Carey	US	12× Platinum	840,000	
26	1997	Savage Garden	Savage Garden	Australia	12× Platinum	840,000	
26	2003	The Complete Greatest Hits	Eagles	US	12× Platinum	840,000	
26	2004	The Sound of White	Missy Higgins	Australia	12× Platinum	840,000	
26	2005	Curtain Call: The Hits	Eminem	US	12× Platinum	840,000	
26	2006	I'm Not Dead	Pink	US	12× Platinum	840,000	
33	1979	The Wall	Pink Floyd	UK	11× Platinum	770,000	
33	1987	Dirty Dancing	Various Artists	US	11× Platinum	770,000	
33	1994	Forrest Gump	Various Artists	US	11× Platinum	770,000	
33	2002	Come Away with Me	Norah Jones	US	11× Platinum	770,000	
33	2008	Only by the Night	Kings of Leon	US	11× Platinum	770,000	
33	2010	Greatest Hits...So Far!!!	Pink	US	11× Platinum	770,000	
33	2014	1989	Taylor Swift	US	11× Platinum	770,000	
33	2017	÷	Ed Sheeran	UK	11× Platinum	770,000	
39	1972	Hot August Night	Neil Diamond	US	14× Platinum	700,000	
39	1975	ABBA	ABBA	Sweden	14× Platinum	700,000	
39	1990	Led Zeppelin Remasters	Led Zeppelin	UK	10× Platinum	700,000	
39	1991	Dangerous	Michael Jackson	US	10× Platinum	700,000	
39	1991	Soul Deep	Jimmy Barnes	Australia	10× Platinum	700,000	
39	1994	Don't Ask	Tina Arena	Australia	10× Platinum	700,000	
39	1994	Throwing Copper	Live	US	10× Platinum	700,000	
39	1995	Greatest Hits	Bruce Springsteen	US	10× Platinum	700,000	
39	1996	Yourself or Someone Like You	Matchbox Twenty	US	10× Platinum	700,000	
39	2000	1	The Beatles	UK	10× Platinum	700,000	
39	2009	I Dreamed a Dream	Susan Boyle	UK	10× Platinum	700,000	
39	2014	×	Ed Sheeran	UK	10× Platinum	700,000	
39	2015	25	Adele	UK	10× Platinum	700,000	

== See also ==
- Australian Recording Industry Association
- Music of Australia
- List of best-selling singles in Australia
- List of best-selling albums by country
