= Lee Kings =

Swedish pop group formed in 1964

The Lee Kings
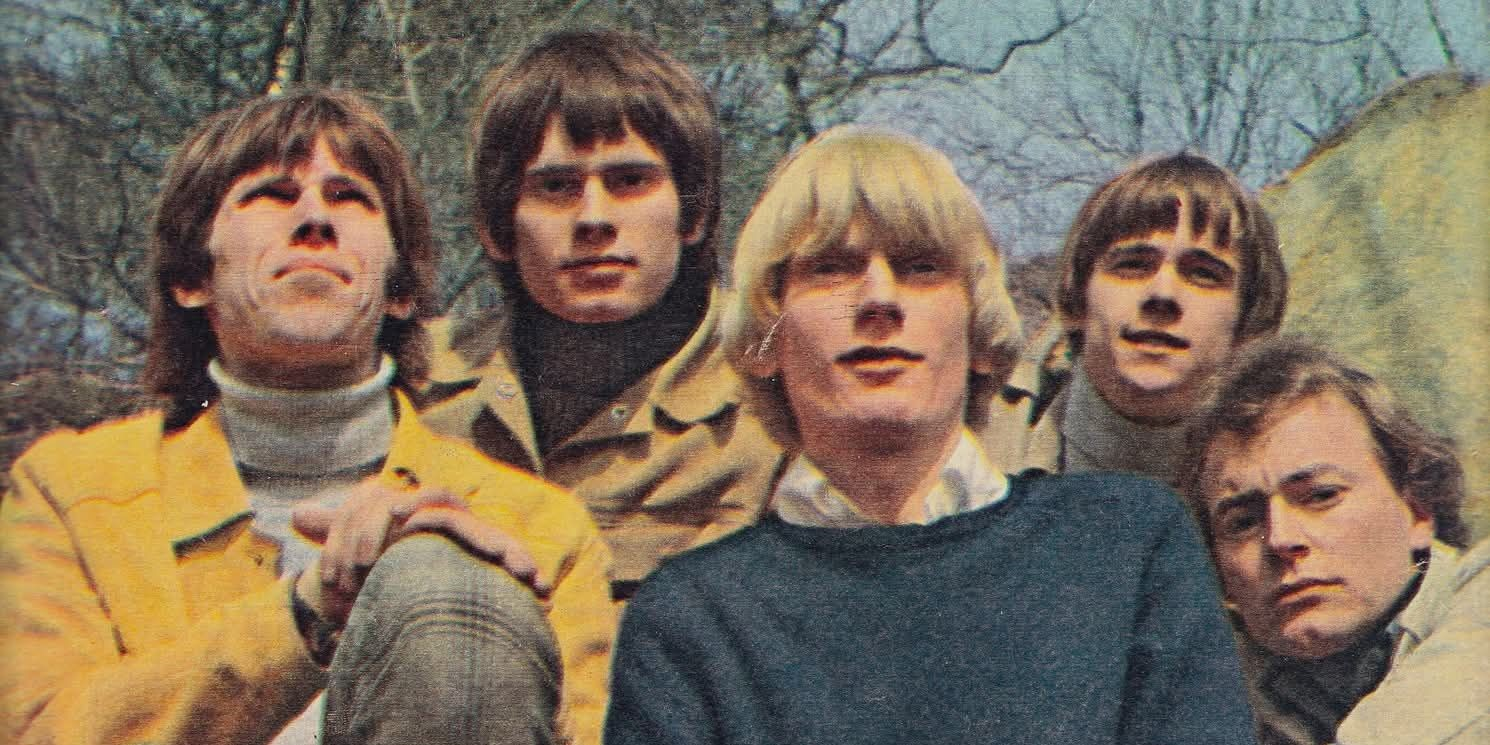
- The Lee Kings with their "definitive" line-up in 1966. Left to right: Bengt Dahlén, Lasse Sandgren, Bjärne Möller, Mike Watson and Lenne Broberg.

Background information
- Also known as: Lenne & The Lee Kings (1964–1965)
- Origin: Stockholm, Sweden
- Genres: Pop
- Years active: 1964–1967
- Labels: Sonet; Gazell; RCA Victor
- Past members: Lenne Broberg; Bengt Dahlén; Bjärne Möller; Olle Nordström; Lasse Sandgren; Mike Watson; Tony Walter; Johnny Lundin; Stephan Möller

The Lee Kings was a pop group from Sweden, established in 1964 as Lenne & The Lee Kings, and scoring several hits on the Tio i Topp chart.

The group initially comprised Lenne Broberg, Bengt Dahlén, Bjarne Möller, Olle Nordström and Lasse Sandgren. In 1966, Olle Nordström left the band and was replaced by Mike Watson. Watson was born in Sheffield and later played with ABBA. In 1967, Lasse Sandgren left the band and was replaced by Tony Walter, and for a while, Bengt Dahlén. Bjarne Möller also left and was replaced by Johnny Lundin.

== History ==
=== Formation and Finnish success (1964–65) ===
Lennart "Lenne" Broberg (27 September 1940 – 2 January 1991) was a Swedish singer who had been active on the Swedish music scene since the late 1950s. Broberg had fronted several bands, including the Falcons and the Adventures, both of whom he managed to score top-15 singles on Tio i Topp in 1962 with. Broberg toured Finland with the Adventures until 1964, when he was forced to leave the band due to the mandatory male conscription Sweden had at the time. It was during the basic military recruit training in September 1964 that he met guitarist Bengt Dahlén (born 16 April 1945), another veteran of the Swedish music scene who had played in the G-Men, who were the backing band for singer Little Gerhard. Broberg and Dahlén recruited rhythm guitarist Bjärne Möller (10 April 1944 – 28 May 2022), bass guitarist Bo Rosendahl (born 28 October 1944) and drummer Thomas Strandberg (born 24 January 1947), to create a quintet. The Lee Kings debuted on stage at the Nalen club in Norrmalm, Stockholm on 29 September 1964.

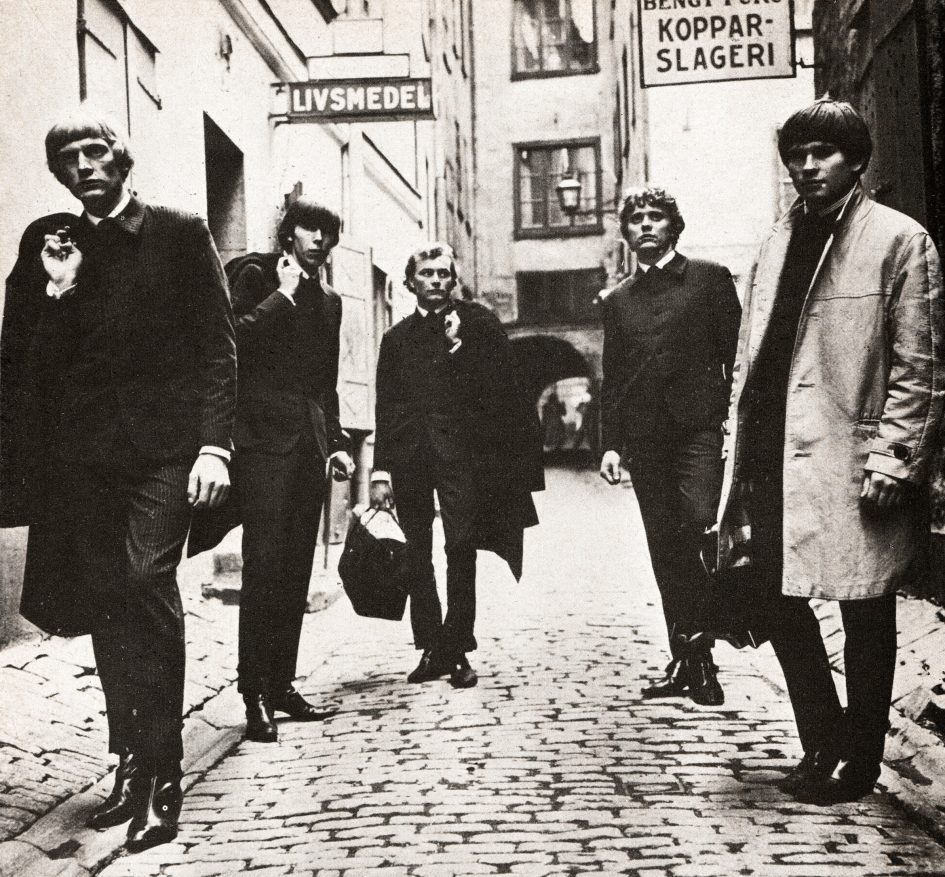
Lenne & The Lee Kings in 1965. Left to right: Bjärne Möller, Bengt Dahlén, Lenne Broberg, Olle Nordström and Lasse Sandgren.

The band choose the name Lenne & The Lee Kings in order to emphasize the previous endeavours of lead singer Broberg, and were reportedly formed as a response to another Swedish group, the Hep Stars. However, Rosendahl left the band shortly after it was formed, being replaced by bass guitarist Olle Nordström (11 May 1941 – 17 January 1986), who had previously played in Sonet Records band the Wild Ones. All members of the band were professional musicians without other full-time jobs, and thus relied entirely on the wages paid by performances and gigs. As a response, Lenne & The Lee Kings decided to tour in Finland where competition from other pop bands wasn't as high. The band quickly became highly regarded for their gigs in Finland, which hastily resulted in a contract with Sonet sublabel Gazell and a management under Benny Englund, whom the band came into contact with through the connections of Nordström.

Upon a brief return from Finland, Lenne & The Lee Kings convened at the Dieke Studio, located in the basement of an apartment complex in the Stockholm suburb of Fruängen in order to record their debut single with Englund producing. The sides chosen were "Always and Ever", an original composition composed by Broberg and Dahlén, and "Stop The Music", which had been written by Clive Westlake and Milton Subotsky. "Always And Ever" was released as Lenne & The Lee Kings debut single in 1965 through Gazell in Sweden, and through Sonet in Finland. On original release, "Always And Ever" was tested by the Tio i Topp audience, but failed to reach the charts. In Finland, however, "Stop The Music" started gaining traction on the Finnish Singles Chart, culminating in the song reaching number 1 in June 1965, staying at the top for 3 months. (Note: During the 1960s, the Finnish Singles Chart was published monthly.) "Stop The Music" became Finland's best selling single in ten years according to Sonet. This propelled the band to stardom in Finland, even though they remained obscure in Sweden. Lenne & The Lee Kings opened in front of 13,000 people for the Rolling Stones first performance in Finland at Yyteri in Porin maalaiskunta on 25 June 1965.

=== Label change and voting coup (1965–66) ===
Shortly after the release of "Stop The Music", drummer Strandberg left the band due to a job opening as an audio engineer at the Dieke Studio, prompting him to be replaced by drummer Lars "Lasse" Sandgren (9 June 1944 – 28 August 2022), previously of rock band Blue Clinters. With this new line-up, the band toured Finland during the summer of 1965 and recorded and released two singles aimed at Finnish audiences; a cover of Doris Day's "Que Sera, Sera (Whatever Will Be, Will Be)" in July 1965, and "L. O. D. (Love On Delivery)" in November 1965. Neither song performed particularly well on the Finnish Charts, peaking at number 38 and 34 respectively, causing Lenne & The Lee Kings to try garnering a following in Sweden instead.

The period between December 1965 and January 1966 came to be extremely tumultuous for Lenne & The Lee Kings due to several major occurrences happening within a short span of time. Nordström, who had been in a vehicular accident, was charged with reckless driving and sentenced to a 1-month prison sentence by the Stockholm City Court, which he started serving on 15 December 1965. This left the band without a bassist, and for the rest of the month they performed with temporary ones; a performance on Sveriges Radio's show Tonårskväll on 15 December saw musician Billy Gezon temporarily filling in on bass guitar. A more permanent replacement came in the form of Sheffield-born British musician Mike Watson (born 31 December 1946), who had been touring Sweden since June 1964 with his pop band the Hi-Grades, backing singers Larry Finnegan and Jerry Williams. Watson joined the band in January 1966 as both their secondary lead vocalist and bassist. According to band biographer Kieron Tyler, the lineup of Broberg, Watson, Dahlén, Möller and Sandgren "became the definitive Lee Kings".

Disillusioned by their lack of promoting the Lee Kings in Sweden, Englund managed to get the band's Sonet Records contract sold to record label Grammofon Electra AB, who assigned the band to RCA Victor. Concurrently with new releases throughout 1966, Gazell continued releasing archive material they had with Lenne & the Lee Kings, including a rendition of Bob Dylan's "Like a Rolling Stone". Additionally, Sonet released a compilation album of the band's music titled Stop The Music on their budget label Grand Prix; this was split album with fellow Stockholm band the Sunspots. Nonetheless, Stop The Music became the band's first released album. This was done in a deliberate attempt to sabotage potential sales and chart successes the Lee Kings would have on their new label. The "Lenne"-prefix was dropped from the band's name on their RCA Victor contract and the band became known simply as the Lee Kings from this point onwards.

The Lee Kings are number one on this week's [Tio i Topp] list. This is because practically all the votes in Malung went to the band. But if it goes as [Georg] Eliasson wants, that the Malung jury's votes are invalid - then Lee Kings will be completely disqualified from the new list!

— Expressen (11 January 1966)

The Lee Kings had re-recorded "Stop The Music" for Swedish audiences in a more refined version in mid-1965, though the Gazell catalogue number for the single remained the same. However, this made the single eligible to be tested for Tio i Topp once again; it was voted into a position of number nine on 1 January 1966. On 8 January, "Stop The Music" managed to reach number 1 on Tio i Topp, with the majority of the votes for the song stemming from the jury in the town of Malung; it was revealed that the Lee Kings had played a gig in Malung on 7 January, where they encouraged the crowd of teenagers to vote for "Stop The Music" during the following day's Tio i Topp. According to radio profile Klas Burling, Sveriges Radio employees immediately suspected that foul play was involved, prompting the public broadcaster to publicly disqualify the 8 January 1966 Tio i Topp list. It was the sole time in Tio i Topp's run between 1961 and 1974 that a weekly list was disqualified.

Nonetheless, the coup generated a lot of publicity in the Swedish mass media for the Lee Kings, who started getting referred to as "pop gangsters" by various newspapers. "Stop The Music" was nonetheless never banned from participating in the following week's editions of Tio i Topp, and achieved a peak of number two on 5 February 1966, a peak position it shared with sales chart Kvällstoppen.

=== Break-up (1967) ===
Towards the end of 1967, Broberg expressed a will to leave the Lee Kings; partly because solo singers earned higher wages than bands, but also because he had recently married his wife Karin. In addition, he expressed disdain towards the Tio i Topp chart, due to the fact an artist's success was based entirely on the vote of pre-teens.

== Members ==
Past members

- Lenne Broberg – lead vocals (1964–1967)
- Bjärne Möller – rhythm guitar, backing vocals (1964–1967)
- Bengt Dahlén – lead guitar, harmonica, backing vocals (1964–1967)
- Johnny Lundin – lead guitar, rhythm guitar, backing vocals (1967)
- Bo Rosendahl – bass guitar (1964)
- Olle Nordström – bass guitar, backing vocals (1964–1965)
- Mike Watson – bass guitar, lead vocals (1966–1967)
- Thomas Strandberg – drums (1964–1965)
- Lasse Sandgren – drums (1965–1967)
- Tony Walters – drums (1967)
- Stephan Möller – drums (1967)

== Discography ==
=== Albums ===
Title	Details
Stop The Music	Released: 1966; Label: Grand Prix (GP-9911); Split album with the Sunspots
Bingo!! For The Lee Kings	Released: 10 November 1966; Label: RCA Victor (LSP 10106)

=== Singles ===
Year	Title	Peak chart positions			Album
Year	Title	Kvällstoppen	Tio i Topp	Finland	Album
1965	"Always And Ever" b/w "Stop The Music"	—	—	—	A: Stop The Music; B: Non-LP Track
1965	"Stop The Music" b/w "Always And Ever"	2	1	1	A: Stop The Music B: Stop The Music
1965	"Que Sera, Sera" b/w "Sticks and Stones"	—	—	38	A: Stop The Music B: Stop The Music
1965	"L. O. D. (Love On Delivery)" b/w "It's Rainin'"	2	1	34	A: Stop The Music B: Stop The Music
1966	"I Just Want to Make Love to You" b/w "La-La-La-Lies"	—	—	—	A: Non-LP Track B: Non-LP Track
1966	"Concrete And Clay" b/w "Outsider"	—	—	—	A: Non-LP Track B: Non-LP Track
1966	"Like a Rolling Stone" b/w "Sticks and Stones"	—	—	—	A: Stop The Music B: Stop The Music
1966	"Why, Why, Why" b/w "Give Me Just Another Beer"	15	6	—	A: Bingo!! For The Lee Kings B: Bingo!! For The Lee Kings
1966	"The Trees Are Talking" b/w "It's Not Right"	—	—	—	A: Bingo!! For The Lee Kings B: Bingo!! For The Lee Kings
1966	"Smile For Me" b/w UK: "Gonna Keep Searchin'"	—	—	—	A: Bingo!! For The Lee Kings B: Bingo!! For The Lee Kings
1967	"Orient Express" b/w: "The Trees Are Talking"	—	12	—	A: Non-LP Track B: Bingo!! For The Lee Kings
1967	"I Can't Go On Living Baby Without You" b/w "They May Forget"	—	5	—	A: Non-LP Track B: Non-LP Track
1967	"Smile For Me" b/w "Take a Message to Mary"	—	13	—	A: Bingo!! For The Lee Kings B: Non-LP Track
1967	"Hot Dogs" b/w "Come On Home"	—	—	—	A: Non-LP Track B: Non-LP Track
1967	"Coming From The Ground" b/w "Day Tripper"	—	—	—	A: Non-LP Track B: Non-LP Track
"—" denotes releases that did not chart.
