= SOS (ABBA song) =

1975 single by ABBA

- Danish picture sleeve

Single by ABBA

from the album ABBA
- B-side: "Man in the Middle"
- Released: 3 June 1975
- Recorded: 22–23 August 1974
- Studio: Glen, Stocksund, Sweden
- Genre: Europop; pop rock
- Length: 3:22
- Label: Polar (Scandinavia); Epic (UK); Atlantic (N. America)
- Songwriters: Björn Ulvaeus; Benny Andersson; Stig Anderson
- Producers: Björn Ulvaeus; Benny Andersson

ABBA singles chronology
"Bang-A-Boomerang" (1975)	"SOS" (1975)	"Mamma Mia" (1975)

Music video
- "SOS" on YouTube

"SOS" is a song by the Swedish pop music group ABBA, recorded for their eponymous third album ABBA (1975). The track features Agnetha Fältskog on lead vocals, and was written by Björn Ulvaeus, Benny Andersson, and Stig Anderson, and produced by Ulvaeus and Andersson. It was released on 3 June 1975 as the fifth single from the album via Polar Music. No singular B-side was issued, although "Man in the Middle" was used in most releases. Fältskog later recorded the song in Swedish for her 1975 solo album Elva kvinnor i ett hus.

A turning point for the group, "SOS" became the group's first major worldwide hit since "Waterloo". Notably, it brought the group back into the top ten in the United Kingdom, a market where they had struggled to thrive in following "Waterloo"; it peaked at number six on the UK singles chart. "SOS" reached the top spot in Australia, Belgium, New Zealand, South Africa, and West Germany, and reached the top ten in most countries. The song also became the group's second overall top ten hit in the United States, peaking at number ten on the Record World Singles chart.

"SOS" has been recognized as one of the group's greatest records, with many artists praising its composition and using it as inspiration for their own records.

== History ==
"SOS" (working title; "Turn Me On") was written by Benny Andersson, Björn Ulvaeus, and Stig Anderson and recorded at Glen Studio in Långängen, Sweden, 22–23 August 1974. The title itself was coined by Stig, though the lyrics he provided were re-written by Ulvaeus. "SOS" was among the first of three songs recorded for the 1975 album ABBA and the opening track of their classic Greatest Hits LP released at the end of the same year.

The song opens with a piano intro, followed by the first verse sung by Fältskog. Biographer Carl Magnus Palm described it as Agnetha's first heartbreak classic, wherein the tear-filled vocal delivery, her trademark, would blend a pop melody with a dash of melancholy. The song features a heavy influence from the Wall of Sound instrumentation of Phil Spector and the melodies of the Beach Boys.

Lyricist Ulvaeus has said that, after three years of trying to figure out what style would define them, ABBA found its identity as a pop group with the release of "SOS", while Palm described it as "pure ABBA".

During the band's first visit to the United States, ABBA performed "SOS" on the long-running television programs American Bandstand and Saturday Night Live on the same date, 15 November 1975. The promotional video was directed by film maker Lasse Hallström and released in the same year along with the single. The video and three others ("I Do, I Do, I Do, I Do, I Do", "Mamma Mia", and "Bang-A-Boomerang"), were completed in two days for a total cost of Kr 50,000 (£5,500). The video was uploaded to YouTube on 8 October 2009 on the AbbaVEVO channel and has over 100 million views as of August 2025.

The song is also featured in the concert film ABBA: The Movie (1977), Good Night Oppy (2022), and Live at Wembley Arena, released in 2014.

== Reception ==
=== Critical ===
Sue Byrom of Record Mirror favorably reviewed "SOS", saying that it "starts off a bit like the old Mary Hopkins "Those Were the Days", but then it kicks off into a much faster rhythm, and sounds quite lovely."

=== Commercial ===
I remember hearing "S.O.S". on the radio in the States and realizing that it was Abba. But it was too late, because I was already transported by it. I just thought it was such a great sound, you know – great bass drum and the whole thing...

— Pete Townshend,
Rolling Stone Magazine, June 1982

"SOS" marked a significant turnaround in ABBA's fortunes and returned them to the Top 10 in many countries. It reached No. 6 in the UK and No. 4 in Ireland, kicking off a run of 18 consecutive Top 10 hits for ABBA in both countries. "SOS" hit No. 1 in Australia, Belgium, France, West Germany (where it spent seven weeks at the top), New Zealand, and South Africa and was a Top 3 hit in Austria, the Netherlands, Norway, Italy (where it became ABBA's most successful hit), Mexico, Rhodesia, and Switzerland. The song also became ABBA's second Top 20 hit in the United States, peaking at No. 15.

As of September 2021 it is ABBA's 19th biggest song in the UK in both pure sales and digital streams.

Chicago radio station WLS, which gave "SOS" much airplay, ranked the song as the 61st biggest hit of 1975. It peaked at number six on their survey of 22 November 1975.

"SOS" has been recorded and performed in concert by several prominent artists including John Frusciante, Peter Cetera, Chris deBurgh, Cher, Portishead, Fozzy, and Canadian rock group Headstones. English synth-pop duo Erasure covered "SOS" and three other ABBA songs on their 1992 Abba-esque EP, reaching No. 1 on the UK singles chart.

Ray Davies of the Kinks said that he was taken with the song after seeing the group perform it on the BBC television show Seaside Special. In 1975 Pete Townshend named it "the best pop song ever written."

American singer-songwriter and former Czars frontman John Grant has called "SOS" "one of the greatest pieces of music ever made", adding that Agnetha Fältskog's "perfect" lyrical interpretation and emotional delivery is "a beautiful thing". British conductor and producer Charles Hazlewood called the song's "supersonic" transition from an acoustic D-minor key to an electric rock motif "absolutely genius".

Sex Pistols bassist Glen Matlock has claimed to have been inspired to write the main riff of "Pretty Vacant" after hearing "SOS" on a jukebox.

ABBA's performance of "SOS" on American Bandstand in 1975 has been included on lists of the most significant performances in the show's 31 seasons by several reviewers and critics. Bill Lamb placed the song at number five, as did Alicia Diaz Dennis and Andres Jauregui.

ABBA performed "SOS" on episode five of the inaugural season of the long-running comedy-variety show Saturday Night Live (SNL) on 15 November 1975. SNL head writer Michael O'Donoghue staged the performance on a set of the deck of the Titanic and continued the sketch while the band were performing. According to bandleader Paul Shaffer, "They kept on singing like the pros that they are."

To date, the song is the only U.S. Billboard Hot 100, UK Official Charts, and Australian number 1 single where both the title and the artist are palindromes.

== Track listing ==
Standard 7-inch single (Note: "Man in the Middle" was used as the B-side in Denmark, Norway, United Kingdom, Germany, Belgium, Yugoslavia, the Netherlands, Austria, Mexico, Portugal, South Africa, Peru, Switzerland, Madagascar, Philippines, United States, Canada, Australia, and New Zealand.)

1. "SOS" – 3:22
2. "Man in the Middle" – 3:00

Spanish, Turkish, Venezuelan, and East German 7-inch single

1. "SOS" – 3:22
2. "I Do, I Do, I Do, I Do, I Do" – 3:15

Italian 7-inch single

1. "SOS" – 3:22
2. "Mamma Mia" – 3:32

Greek 7-inch single

1. "SOS"
2. "Hasta Mañana"

Brazilian 7-inch single

1. "SOS" – 3:18
2. "Dance (While the Music Still Goes On)" – 3:12

Panamanian 7-inch single

1. "SOS" – 3:22
2. "Honey, Honey" – 2:55

== Personnel ==
- Agnetha Fältskog – double-tracked vocals
- Anni-Frid Lyngstad – harmony vocals
- Björn Ulvaeus – guitar, backing vocals
- Benny Andersson – keyboards, synthesizer, backing vocals
- Ola Brunkert – drums
- Lasse Wellander, Janne Schaffer – guitar
- Mike Watson – bass

== Chart performance ==
=== Weekly charts ===
Weekly chart performance for "SOS"
Chart (1975–1976)	Peak position
Australia (Kent Music Report)	1
Austria (Ö3 Austria Top 40)	2
Belgium (Ultratop 50 Flanders)	1
Belgium (Ultratop 50 Wallonia)	4
Canada CHR (The Record)	9
Canada Top Singles (RPM)	37
Canada Adult Contemporary (RPM)	17
Denmark (Danmarks Radio)	7
France (IFOP)	10
Ireland (IRMA)	4
Italy (Musica e dischi)	2
Netherlands (Dutch Top 40)	2
Netherlands (Single Top 100)	2
New Zealand (Recorded Music NZ)	1
Norway (VG-lista)	2
Rhodesia (Lyons Maid)	2
South Africa (Springbok Radio)	1
Switzerland (Schweizer Hitparade)	3
UK Singles (Official Charts)	6
US Billboard Hot 100	15
US Adult Contemporary (Billboard)	19
US Cash Box Top 100	12
US Radio & Records Rock Singles	10
US Pop/40 (Radio & Records)	18
US Record World Singles	10
West Germany (GfK)	1

Chart (2001)	Peak position
Japan (Oricon)	15

=== Monthly charts ===
Monthly chart performance for "SOS"
Chart (1977)	Peak position
Soviet Union International Songs (MK)	4

=== Year-end charts ===
Annual chart rankings for "SOS"
Chart (1975)	Rank
Australia (Kent Music Report)	52
Belgium (Ultratop Flanders)	22
Canada Top Singles (RPM)	160
Netherlands (Dutch Top 40)	27
Netherlands (Single Top 100)	29
South Africa (Springbok Radio)	8
Switzerland (Schweizer Hitparade)	8
UK Singles (OCC)	48
US Billboard Hot 100	140
West Germany (Official German Charts)	18

Chart (1976)	Rank
Australia (Kent Music Report)	16
New Zealand (Recorded Music NZ)	37

== Certifications and sales ==
Certifications and sales for "SOS"
Region	Certification	Certified units/sales
Denmark (IFPI Danmark)	Gold	45,000^{‡}
France	—	500,000
Germany	—	500,000
Japan (RIAJ) 2001 release	Platinum	100,000^{^}
New Zealand (RMNZ)	Platinum	30,000^{‡}
United Kingdom (BPI) digital sales since 2004	Platinum	600,000^{‡}
Yugoslavia	Silver	60,000
Summaries
Europe	—	4,000,000
^{^} Shipments figures based on certification alone.^{‡} Sales+streaming figures based on certification alone.

== Release history ==
Region	Date	Title	Label	Format	Catalog
Netherlands	May 1975	"SOS" / "Man In The Middle"	Polydor	7-inch vinyl	2001 585
Denmark, Norway	Jun 1975	"SOS" / "Man In The Middle"	Polar	7-inch vinyl	POS 1213
Belgium	Jul 1975	"SOS" / "Man In The Middle"	Vogue	7-inch vinyl	VF. 421
USA, Canada	Jul 1975	"SOS" / "Man In The Middle"	Atlantic	7-inch vinyl	45-3265
USA	Jul 1975	"SOS" / "SOS"	Atlantic	7-inch vinyl, promo	45-3265
UK	5 Sep 1975	"SOS" / "Man In The Middle"	Epic	7-inch vinyl	S EPC 3576
Australia, New Zealand	27 Oct 1975	"SOS" / "Man In The Middle"	RCA Victor	7-inch vinyl	102690
Yugoslavia	29 Oct 1975	"SOS" / "Man In The Middle"	PGP RTB	7-inch vinyl	S 53 896
Mexico	Oct 1975	"SOS" / "Man In The Middle"	RCA Victor	7-inch vinyl	SP-4390
Italy	19 Nov 1975	"SOS" / "Mamma Mia"	Dig-It International Records	7-inch vinyl	DG 1124
Austria, Portugal, Switzerland, West Germany	1975	"SOS" / "Man In The Middle"	Polydor	7-inch vinyl	2001 585
Philippines	1975	"SOS" / "Man In The Middle"	Polydor	7-inch vinyl	PRO 3441, 2001 585
Panama, Peru	1975	"SOS" / "Man In The Middle"	RCA Victor	7-inch vinyl	XRPBO 793
El Salvador	1975	"SOS" / "Hey, Hey Helen"	RCA Victor	7-inch vinyl	XYPBO-759
Brazil	1975	"SOS" / "Dance (While the Music Still Goes On)"	RCA Victor	7-inch vinyl	101.8043
Greece	1975	"SOS" / "Hasta Mañana"	Pan-Vox	7-inch vinyl	PAN 7593
East Germany	1975	"SOS" / "I Do, I Do, I Do, I Do, I Do"	Amiga	7-inch vinyl	4 56 160
Spain	1975	"SOS" / "I Do, I Do, I Do, I Do, I Do"	Carnaby	7-inch vinyl	MO 1496
Turkey	1975	"SOS" / "I Do, I Do, I Do, I Do, I Do"	Balet	7-inch vinyl	BE 172
Venezuela	1975	"SOS" / "I Do, I Do, I Do, I Do, I Do"	RCA Victor	7-inch vinyl	45.661
Japan	Jan 1976	"SOS" / "I Do, I Do, I Do, I Do, I Do"	Discomate	7-inch vinyl	DSP-1
Japan	Apr 1980	"SOS" / "I Do, I Do, I Do, I Do, I Do"	Discomate	7-inch vinyl, reissue	DSP-151
Japan	25 Jan 2001	"SOS" / "Chiquitita"	Polar	CD single	UICY-5001

== Swedish version by Agnetha Fältskog ==
"SOS"

Single by Agnetha Fältskog

from the album Elva kvinnor i ett hus
- B-side: "Visa I Åttonde Månaden"
- Released: November 1975
- Studio: Glen, Stocksund, Sweden
- Genre: Pop
- Length: 3:22
- Label: Cupol
- Songwriters: Björn Ulvaeus; Benny Andersson; Stig Anderson
- Producers: Björn Ulvaeus; Benny Andersson

Agnetha Fältskog singles chronology
"Dom Har Glömt" (1975)	"SOS" (1975)	"När Du Tar Mej I Din Famn" (1979)

Audio video
- "S.O.S." on YouTube

Agnetha Fältskog's version was the second single from her fifth Swedish solo-album Elva kvinnor i ett hus (Eleven Women in One House). It was the only song from this album not to have been composed by Fältskog herself.

Despite the fact that Fältskog never promoted the single in Sweden, it peaked at No. 4 on the singles chart on 1 January 1976 during a 20-week chart run, and it also became Fältskog's third No. 1 on radio chart Svensktoppen, entering the chart on 22 November 1975 and spending a total of eleven weeks on the listing.

The B-side of the single, "Visa I Åttonde Månaden" (Song in the Eighth Month) was a song written from a very personal perspective, as it was composed during Fältskog's pregnancy with daughter Linda Ulvaeus in 1973.

Chart (1975-1976)	Peak position
Sweden (Sverigetopplistan)	4
Sweden (Svenkstoppen)	1

== Cher version ==
"SOS"

Single by Cher

from the album Dancing Queen
- Released: 23 August 2018
- Recorded: 2018
- Studio: Metrophonic (London, England)
- Genre: Pop
- Length: 3:22
- Label: Warner Bros.
- Songwriters: Benny Andersson; Björn Ulvaeus; Stig Anderson
- Producer: Mark Taylor

Cher singles chronology
"Gimme! Gimme! Gimme! (A Man After Midnight)" (2018)	"SOS" (2018)	"Chiquitita" (2020)

Music video
- "SOS" on YouTube

American singer Cher's version was the second single from her 2018 album Dancing Queen. It was released on 23 August 2018. The song peaked at number 56 in the Scottish singles chart in August of that year.

=== Critical reception ===
Writing for Rolling Stone, Brittany Spanos felt that "working with producer Mark Taylor who helped seal Cher's legacy with the game-changing 'Believe' in the late Nineties, she finds subtle changes that update ABBA classics without totally stripping them of the catchiness that made those songs beloved hits well beyond their heyday. 'Gimme! Gimme! Gimme! (A Man After Midnight),' 'SOS' and 'Mamma Mia' are given just enough of a knob turn that they're transformed from upbeat FM radio pop into club bangers, pulsating with every beat."

=== Music video ===
An accompanying music video for "SOS" was directed by Jake Wilson, and was premiered through Cher's official YouTube channel on 18 September 2018. The video features Rumer Willis, singer Betty Who, Transparent star Trace Lysette, comedian Sabrina Jalees, Elena of Avalor voice actor Aimee Carrero and Crazy Ex-Girlfriend cast member Vella Lovell. It was styled by fashion director William Graper in a similar fashion to the original ABBA video. It was also listed as the 18th best music video of 2018 by Paper. Roytel Montero said that "in a studied homage to the original ABBA classic from 1975, [the] interpretation of the video renders it a poignant call to female solidarity".

=== Live performances ===
Cher appeared on The Ellen Show on 7 September 2018, to promote her ABBA tribute album Dancing Queen. During her appearance on Ellen, Cher also performed her rendition of ABBA's "SOS" and discussed her upcoming world tour. During her Here We Go Again Tour she performs "SOS" together with "Waterloo" and "Fernando". On 31 October 2018 "The Shoop Shoop Song (It's in His Kiss)" and "Take Me Home" were cut from her Classic Cher concert residency and "Waterloo", "SOS" and "Fernando" were added.

=== Track listings and formats ===
==== Digital download ====
- "SOS" – 3:22

=== Credits and personnel ===
Credits for Dancing Queen adapted from AllMusic.

==== Management ====
- Published by Universal Songs of PolyGramInt., Inc. (ASCAP) and EMI Grove Park Music Inc. (BMI)
- Recorded by Mark Taylor and Paul Meehan at Metrophonic Studios, London
- Mixed at by Matt Furmidge and Mark Taylor at Metrophonic Studios, London
- Mastered by Sthephen Marcussen Mastering, Hollywood, CA

==== Personnel ====
- Cher – primary vocals
- Benny Andersson – songwriter
- Stig Anderson – songwriter
- Björn Ulvaeus – songwriter
- Ash Soan – drums
- Adam Phillips – guitars
- Hayley Sanderson – backing vocals
- Andy Caine – backing vocals

=== Charts ===
Chart (2018)	Peak position
ERROR in "CIS": Invalid position: 688. Expected number 1–200 or dash (–).
Scottish Singles Sales (Official Charts)	56
UK Singles Sales (OCC)	78
