= I've Been Waiting for You (ABBA song) =

Single by ABBA

from the album ABBA
- B-side: "King Kong Song"
- Released: 18 November 1974
- Recorded: 15 September 1974
- Studio: Glen Studio, Stockholm
- Length: 3:41
- Label: Polar; RCA Victor
- Songwriters: Benny Andersson; Björn Ulvaeus; Stig Anderson
- Producers: Benny Andersson; Björn Ulvaeus

ABBA singles chronology
"So Long" (1974)	"I've Been Waiting for You" (1974)	"I Do, I Do, I Do, I Do, I Do" (1975)

Alternative cover
- New Zealand single

Audio video
- "I've Been Waiting For You" on YouTube

"I've Been Waiting for You" is a song by the Swedish recording group ABBA, recorded for their eponymous third studio album (1975). Agnetha Fältskog sings the lead vocals to the track, which was written by Benny Andersson, Björn Ulvaeus, and Stig Anderson. It was released on 18 November 1974 as the album's second single, simultaneously with "So Long". In most countries, it was included as the B-side to "So Long". In Australia, both tracks were released as separate singles released simultaneously.

The song proved a moderate chart success, reaching number 49 on the Australian Kent Music Report chart; it would actually chart higher than "So Long", which did not enter the Kent Music Report at all. The track was released in New Zealand in 1977 following the group's success there, and peaked at number eight on the NZ Singles Chart. The cassette version of the album contains an extended version of the song that repeats the third verse and chorus.

Like most of ABBA's hits, the song was covered in Mamma Mia! Here We Go Again. In 2025, the song was re-released along with "Lay All Your Love on Me" as a limited edition heart-shaped vinyl for Valentine's Day.

== Content ==
In the song, Fältskog sings of how thrilled and excited she is now that she has found 'the object of her affection'.

During the 1990's, PolyGram had plans to release an ABBA remix album. Andersson, in particular, wanted to remix, because he was not fond of the 'harsh sound' of the recording. However, the plans never came to fruition.

== Mamma Mia! Here We Go Again version ==
I've Been Waiting for You was released on 13 July 2018, alongside the soundtrack of Mamma Mia! Here We Go Again, by Capitol and Polydor Records. The song is performed by Amanda Seyfried (Sophie), Julie Walters (Rosie), and Christine Baranski (Tanya), and it was produced by Benny Andersson. This version features revised lyrics by Björn Ulvaeus.

== Track listings and formats ==
Australian and New Zealand 7-inch single

1. "I've Been Waiting for You" – 3:38
2. "King Kong Song" – 3:14

== Personnel ==
ABBA

- Agnetha Fältskog – double-tracked lead vocals, harmony vocals
- Anni-Frid Lyngstad – backing vocals
- Björn Ulvaeus – guitar, backing vocals
- Benny Andersson – synthesizers, backing vocals

Additional personnel

- Roger Palm – drums
- Rutger Gunnarsson – bass
- Janne Schaffer, Finn Sjöberg – guitar

=== Charts ===
Chart (1975–1977)	Peak position
Australia (Kent Music Report)	49
Belgium (Ultratop 50 Wallonia) Double A-side with "So Long"	42
New Zealand (Recorded Music NZ)	8

Chart (2018)	Peak position
Scottish Singles Sales (Official Charts)	51

== Certifications ==
Region	Certification	Certified units/sales
United Kingdom (BPI)	Silver	200,000^{‡}
^{‡} Sales+streaming figures based on certification alone.
