= Rock Me (ABBA song) =

1975 single by ABBA

- Reverse of Danish "I Do, I Do, I Do, I Do, I Do" picture sleeve

Single by ABBA

from the album ABBA
- Released: April 1976
- Recorded: 1974
- Genre: Rock
- Length: 3:06
- Label: Polar (Sweden)
- Songwriters: Björn Ulvaeus; Benny Andersson
- Producers: Björn Ulvaeus; Benny Andersson

ABBA singles chronology
"Mamma Mia" (1975)	"Rock Me" (1976)	"Fernando" (1976)

Audio video
- "Rock Me" on YouTube

"Rock Me" is a song recorded in 1974 by Swedish pop group ABBA, with Björn Ulvaeus singing the lead vocals. It was first released on their third album, ABBA, and was used as the B-side to the group's 1975 single "I Do, I Do, I Do, I Do, I Do". However, after "I Do, I Do, I Do, I Do, I Do" hit number one in both Australia and New Zealand, "Rock Me" was released as an A-side in April 1976, reaching number four and number two respectively. It was also issued as an A-side in Yugoslavia and in 1979 it was included on the band's Greatest Hits Vol. 2 album.

ABBA performed the track on both their world tours, as seen in ABBA: The Movie (1977). The song was originally to be featured in the ABBA musical "Mamma Mia!", to be sung on a boat, as the three fathers and a deleted character (Stanley) rocked the boat from side to side.

== History ==
"Rock Me", whose working title had been "Didn't I?", was first recorded as "Baby" (with different lyrics to the final version) on 18 October 1974 at Glen Studio. This "tongue in cheek" version, with vocals by Agnetha, was first released on CD on the 1994 box set Thank You for the Music as part of the "ABBA Undeleted" section.

== Charts ==
=== Weekly charts ===
Chart (1976)	Peak position
Australia (Kent Music Report)	4
New Zealand (Recorded Music NZ)	2

=== Year-end charts ===
Chart (1976)	Position
Australia (Kent Music Report)	14
