= Bang-A-Boomerang =

ABBA song, first sung by Svenne & Lotta

- Original Swedish language single artwork

Single by Svenne & Lotta

from the album Svenne & Lotta/2
- B-side: "Kom Ta En Sista Dans Med Mej (Dance (While The Music Still Goes On))" (Swedish-language release); "Roly-Poly Girl" (English-language release)
- Released: 1975
- Recorded: November 1974
- Genre: Schlager; rock and roll
- Length: 3:02
- Label: Polar
- Songwriters: Benny Andersson; Stig Anderson; Björn Ulvaeus
- Producers: Björn Ulvaeus; Benny Andersson

Svenne & Lotta singles chronology
"Dance (While The Music Still Goes On)" (1975)	"Bang-A-Boomerang" (1975)	"Tell Laura I Love Her" (1975)

Audio videos
- "Bang en boomerang" (Swedish version) on YouTube; "Bang-A-Boomerang" (English version) on YouTube

"Bang-A-Boomerang"
- French picture sleeve

Single by ABBA

from the album ABBA
- B-side: "SOS"
- Released: 21 April 1975
- Recorded: November 1974; Spring 1975
- Genre: Rock
- Length: 3:05
- Label: Vogue
- Songwriters: Benny Andersson; Stig Anderson; Björn Ulvaeus
- Producers: Björn Ulvaeus; Benny Andersson

ABBA singles chronology
"I Do, I Do, I Do, I Do, I Do" (1975)	"Bang-A-Boomerang" (1975)	"SOS" (1975)

Music video
- "Bang-A-Boomerang" on YouTube

"Bang-A-Boomerang" is a song written by ABBA members Benny Andersson, Björn Ulvaeus, and their manager Stig Anderson. It was first recorded and released by duo Svenne and Lotta in both Swedish and English. The track was first recorded as a demo with English lyrics (but without any recorded vocals) in September 1974 by the ABBA musicians for their eponymous album ABBA. The track's working title was "Stop and Listen to Your Heart". The lyrics compare the "message of love" with the returning boomerangs which the Aboriginal Australians developed. Svenne and Lotta's version was released in 1975.

ABBA would later record their version of "Bang-A-Boomerang" for their eponymous third studio album. Their version was released as a single in France, South Africa, and Madagascar.

== History ==
In late 1974, Andersson, Ulvaeus and Anderson were invited by Sveriges Television as composers to submit a song to the 1975 Melodifestivalen. Since ABBA themselves did not want to compete in the contest again, just one year after having won, they instead gave the opportunity and the song to Polar Music labelmates Svenne & Lotta. "Bang-A-Boomerang" was given new Swedish lyrics by Stig Anderson and retitled "Bang en Boomerang" and the duo subsequently made a vocal recording of the track in November 1974—produced by Björn & Benny—with a different arrangement, most noticeably slightly shorter (2:50) than the original demo, to fit the Eurovision three-minute rule. The song finished third in the Swedish preselections in February 1975, became one of Svenne & Lotta's biggest hits and spent seven weeks on the Svensktoppen radio chart during the period 9 March – 11 May 1975, with a second place as best result. Svenne & Lotta also recorded the song with the original English lyrics, both versions were included on their 1975 album Svenne & Lotta/2 (Polar POLS 259). The English version was also released as a single in Denmark and became a big seller there. From a Scandinavian perspective, the track is therefore still primarily seen as a hit single and Melodifestivalen classic by Svenne & Lotta. Under the name of "Sven & Charlotte", their original English version was also released in most European countries, and in Oceania, charting in several.

ABBA then re-recorded their English-language version of the song in the Spring of 1975, using the Svenne & Lotta backing track—reputedly to the surprise of the duo, included it on their ABBA album and later also released it as a single in France on 21 April 1975, with "SOS" as B-side, where it was a minor hit. Although the track was included on the band's first Greatest Hits album, released on 17 November 1975, the ABBA version was in fact never issued as a single in Scandinavia. "Bang-A-Boomerang" later served as a B-side to "I Do, I Do, I Do, I Do, I Do" in the US and Canada and "Mamma Mia" in Turkey.

== Critical reception ==
Billboard reviewed Svenne and Lotta's version favorably, describing it as a "goodtime rocker with the ABBA sound." Cash Box reviewed positively of Svenne and Lotta's version as well, calling it a "rock 'n' roll offering [...] with some driving bass lines that should earn the song disco play." Record World wrote of Svenne and Lotta's version that it "instills the flash and vigor of the original version that was already a major hit around the world."

== Track listing ==
=== Svenne & Lotta version ===
English 7-inch single

1. "Bang-a-Boomerang" – 3:02
2. "Roly-Poly Girl" – 2:40

Swedish 7-inch single

1. "Bang En Boomerang" (Svensk Version)
2. "Kom Ta En Sista Med Mej" ("Dance (While the Music Still Goes On)")

=== ABBA version ===
7-inch single

1. "Bang-a-Boomerang" – 3:05
2. "SOS" – 3:21

== Chart positions ==
Svenne & Lotta's version

Chart (1975)	Peak position
Australia (Kent Music Report)	94
Belgium (Ultratop 50 Flanders)	29
Denmark (Danmarks Radio)	2
Norway (VG-lista)	11
Sweden (Kvällstoppen)	5
