= List of best-selling albums in New Zealand =

An album is defined by Recorded Music New Zealand (RMNZ) as being a type of music release comprising at least five songs or a total playing time of over 25 minutes. (Note: If a release contains multiple mixes of a single song, then only the longest track counts toward the 25-minute limit. If the playing time of different songs is less than 25 minutes and the total playing time of all tracks (including multiple mixes) is less than 40 minutes, then the release is defined as a single. In any case, if the total playing time is greater than 40 minutes, it is an album.) Currently, Platinum certifications denote the shipment of 15,000 copies. When RMNZ (then known as the Recording Industry Association of New Zealand) introduced certifications in 1978, to reach Platinum status an album had to ship 20,000 copies. This was reduced to its current level in 1992.

The best-selling albums in New Zealand, as judged by certifications, are ABBA's greatest hits album, The Best of ABBA (1975) and Dire Straits' Brothers in Arms (1985); both have been certified 24-times Platinum. ABBA's album ABBA Gold: Greatest Hits (1992) is also one of New Zealand's best-selling albums. Pink Floyd, Ed Sheeran and Adele are the only other artists with two entries on the list. Hayley Westenra, Six60 and Fat Freddy's Drop the only artists of New Zealand origin with an album on this list.

== Best-selling albums ==
Rank	Album	Artist	Year of release	Number of times certified platinum	Shipments
1	The Best of ABBA	ABBA	1975	24	360,000
1	Brothers in Arms	Dire Straits	1985	24	360,000
3	Come On Over	Shania Twain	1997	21	315,000
4	Legend	Bob Marley and the Wailers	1984	20	300,000
5	÷	Ed Sheeran	2017	18	270,000^{‡}
5	21	Adele	2011	18	270,000^{‡}
7	Bat Out of Hell	Meat Loaf	1977	17	255,000
7	Born in the U.S.A.	Bruce Springsteen	1984	17	255,000
7	×	Ed Sheeran	2014	17	255,000^{‡}
10	ABBA Gold: Greatest Hits	ABBA	1992	16	240,000
10	The Dark Side of the Moon	Pink Floyd	1973	16	240,000
10	25	Adele	2015	16	240,000^{‡}
13	1	The Beatles	2000	15	225,000
14	Jagged Little Pill	Alanis Morissette	1995	14	210,000
14	Jeff Wayne's Musical Version of The War of the Worlds	Jeff Wayne	1978	14	210,000
14	The Joshua Tree	U2	1987	14	210,000
14	The Wall	Pink Floyd	1979	14	210,000
14	Rumours	Fleetwood Mac	1977	14	210,000
14	Christmas	Michael Bublé	2011	14	210,000^{‡}
20	In the Lonely Hour	Sam Smith	2014	13	195,000^{‡}
20	Six60 (1)	Six60	2011	13	195,000^{‡}
20	Doo-Wops & Hooligans	Bruno Mars	2010	13	195,000^{‡}
23	Come Away with Me	Norah Jones	2002	12	180,000
23	Falling into You	Celine Dion	1996	12	180,000
23	The Phantom of the Opera	Various Artists	1987	12	180,000
23	Pure	Hayley Westenra	2003	12	180,000
23	Thriller	Michael Jackson	1982	12	180,000
23	Unplugged	Eric Clapton	1992	12	180,000
23	Based on a True Story	Fat Freddy's Drop	2005	12	180,000^{‡}

== See also ==
- List of best-selling albums
  - List of best-selling albums by country
- List of best-selling singles by country§New Zealand

== Notes ==
- ^{‡}Certification include on-demand audio and video streams and track sale equivalent
