= Hey, Hey Helen =

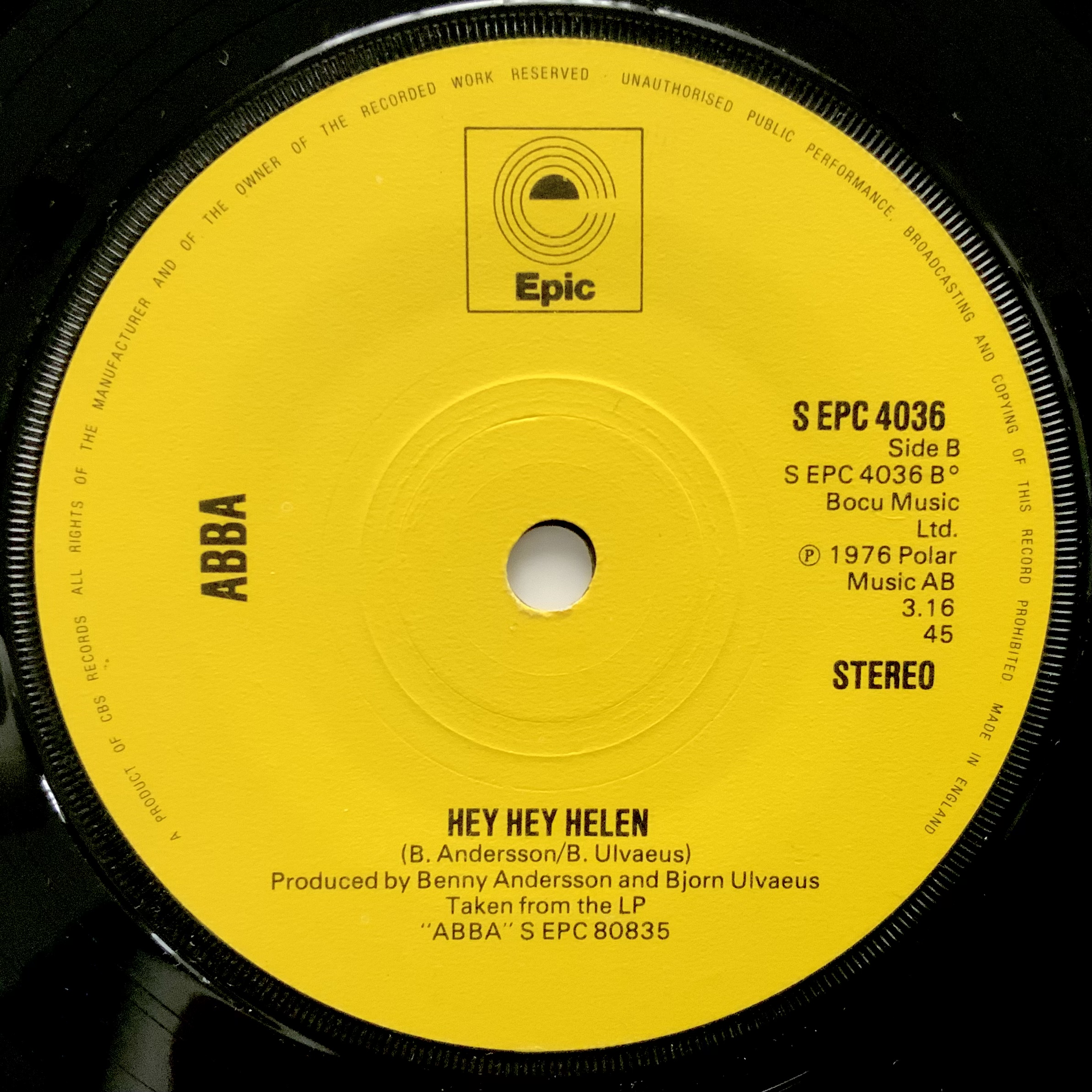

Song by ABBA

from the album ABBA
- A-side: "Fernando"; "Mamma Mia" (Australia)
- Released: April 21, 1975
- Recorded: 14 September 1974
- Studio: Glen Studio
- Genre: Glam rock; hard rock
- Length: 3:16
- Label: Polar; Epic; Atlantic
- Songwriters: Björn Ulvaeus; Benny Andersson
- Producers: Björn Ulvaeus; Benny Andersson

Audio video
- "Hey, Hey Helen" on YouTube

"Hey, Hey Helen" is a song by ABBA, featured on their 1975 self-titled album. It was used as the B-side to Mamma Mia in Australia and Fernando in the United Kingdom.

== Analysis ==
The song is in the Glam rock genre. George Starostin Reviews says the song has "perfectly tolerable lyrics about a family breakup" from an anti-feminist perspective. PopDose says "'Helen' took an adult look at divorce and single motherhood in a time when the divorce rate was up and the traditional family unit was taking a beating. At first, the lyrics seem a bit judgmental, until you get to that last bit in the chorus where the girls assure the newly single mother that she can, in fact, make it alone".

== Critical reception ==
The Trouser Press record guide described the song as "obscure". OneWeekOneBand said "The best bit of this - OK maybe apart from the riff - is where the lyrics go “Can you make it alone?” and the backing vox reply “Yes you can” and to prove it the song goes into a FUNK BREAKDOWN, the only one in ABBA's catalogue." George Starostin Reviews says the song is "quite memorable", and adds it is "what all those 'heavy metal tunes' off Waterloo would have sounded like" if they had been given more of the 'ABBA' sound. It adds "the heavy guitar riffs on that one don't bother me in the least, as they never try to sound dreary or 'mock-ominous': they just emphasize the power of the tune, which is, in my opinion, a highly underrated ABBA classic, with all those riffs, a catchy, rhythmic synth solo, a groovy drum pattern". PopDose describes the song as "one of the earliest glimmers that ABBA were more than just your standard bubblegum pop group". It wondered why the song wasn't featured in the Mamma Mia musical considering its subject matter, and theorises that it was because the song wasn't popular enough. It notes, however, that the group mimed it for quite a few TV appearances at the time, citing “Don Kirshner’s Rock Concert” in 1975.

== Covers ==
Lush covered the song for an abandoned anti-poll tax compilation. The cover version was released on their 1990 album Gala.
