= Polar Music =

Swedish record company

Polar Music International AB
- Parent company: Universal Music Sweden
- Founded: 1963; 63 years ago
- Founder: Stig Anderson; Bengt Bernhag
- Genre: Pop; Rock
- Country of origin: Sweden
- Location: Stockholm, Sweden

Polar Music is a Swedish record company founded in 1963 by Stig Anderson and his friend Bengt Bernhag.

== Background ==
The first act that Polar Music signed was the Hootenanny Singers featuring Björn Ulvaeus. Polar eventually gained prosperity producing Ulvaeus' next group, international superstars ABBA. As a small Scandinavian company based in Sweden, Polar could not afford to set up operations worldwide and was ABBA's record company only in the Scandinavian countries. Therefore, ABBA's recordings were licensed to different record companies in each country, but usually to companies that had international operations, meaning they could effectively compete with each other to acquire the licenses in more countries if they proved successful in their own. The licenses gave the companies a few allowances to issue certain tracks as singles that Polar had not, or to modify single (and occasionally album) artwork. The licenses were for three years at a time, meaning that between 1989 and 1992 they all expired. This enabled PolyGram to release Gold: Greatest Hits to major success around the world.

Polar Music is currently distributed by Universal Music Group whose predecessor company, PolyGram, purchased it in 1989. However, Polar Music International AB legally still exists and ABBA's recordings remain copyrighted to the company. Polar is now ABBA's record label internationally, and the historic Polar vinyl label designs have been used on the group's CD releases since 2004 (usually on deluxe releases of studio albums).

The Polar Music Prize, an award for outstanding musical achievement, was created by Stig Anderson, the same year after he sold the label to PolyGram.

== Polar Music artists ==
Artists signed by Polar Music included ABBA, Alive Feat, Jessie Martins, Lena Andersson, Chana, Crosstalk, Dilba, Emilia, Anni-Frid Lyngstad, Agnetha Fältskog and Linda Ulvaeus, Ted Gärdestad, Gemini, The Hellacopters, The Infinite Mass, Fredrik Kempe, Lambretta, Maarja, Paulo Mendonça, Mr. Vegas Fea Intense, Emma Nilsdotter, Mats Paulson, Pineforest Crunch, Sam (musician), Skintrade, Starr Chukki/infinit, Svenne and Lotta (Sven Hedlund and Charlotte Walker), Joey Tempest, Top-Notch, Harpo (Jan Torsten Svensson), Topaz Sound and Anders Widmark. The last band to be signed to Polar were Beagle whose two albums for the label Sound On Sound and Within are considered to be power-pop classics.

== ABBA's Polar releases ==
ABBA
Year	Cat. no.	Single	Album
1970	—	—N/a —	Lycka – (POLS 226)
1972	POS 1156	"People Need Love" "Merry-Go-Round (En karusell)"	Ring Ring – (POLS 242)
1972	POS 1168	"He Is Your Brother" "Santa Rosa"	Ring Ring – (POLS 242)
1973	POS 1172	"Ring Ring" "She's My Kind of Girl"	Ring Ring – (POLS 242)
1973	POS 1176	"Love Isn't Easy" "I Am Just a Girl"	Ring Ring – (POLS 242)
1974	POS 1187	"Waterloo" "Watch Out"	Waterloo – (POLS 252)
1974	POS 1192	"Honey, Honey" "King Kong Song"	Waterloo – (POLS 252)
1974	POS 1195	"So Long" "I've Been Waiting for You"	ABBA – (POLS 262)
1975	POS 1207	"I Do, I Do, I Do, I Do, I Do" "Rock Me"	ABBA – (POLS 262)
1975	POS 1213	"SOS" "Man in the Middle"	ABBA – (POLS 262)
1975	POS 1220	"Mamma Mia" "Intermezzo No. 1"	ABBA – (POLS 262)
1976	POS 1224	"Fernando" "Hey, Hey Helen"	Greatest Hits – (POLS 266)
1976	POS 1225	"Dancing Queen" "That's Me"	Arrival – (POLS 272)
1976	POS 1227	"Money, Money, Money" "Crazy World"	Arrival – (POLS 272)
1977	POS 1230	"Knowing Me, Knowing You" "Happy Hawaii"	Arrival – (POLS 272)
1977	POS 1234	"The Name of the Game" "I Wonder (Departure)" (live version)	The Album – (POLS 282)
1978	POS 1235	"Take a Chance on Me" "I'm a Marionette"	The Album – (POLS 282)
1978	POS 1237	"Eagle" "Thank You for the Music"	The Album – (POLS 282)
1978	POS 1239	"Summer Night City" "Medley: Pick a Bale of Cotton - On Top of Old Smokey - Midnight Special"	Non-album single
1979	POS 1244	"Chiquitita" "Lovelight"	Voulez-Vous – (POLS 292)
1979	POS 1251	"Does Your Mother Know" "Kisses of Fire"	Voulez-Vous – (POLS 292)
1979	POS 1253	"Voulez-Vous" "Angeleyes"	Voulez-Vous – (POLS 292)
1979	POS 1260	"I Have a Dream" "Take a Chance on Me" (live version)	Voulez-Vous – (POLS 292)
1979	POS 1256	"Gimme! Gimme! Gimme! (A Man After Midnight)" "The King Has Lost His Crown"	Greatest Hits Vol. 2 – (POLS 312)
1980	—	—N/a —	Gracias Por La Música – (SRLM-1)
1980	POS 1272	"The Winner Takes It All" "Elaine"	Super Trouper – (POLS 322)
1980	POS 1274	"Super Trouper" "The Piper"	Super Trouper – (POLS 322)
1981	POS 1291	"One of Us" "Should I Laugh or Cry"	The Visitors – (POLS 342)
1982	POS 1296	"Head over Heels" "The Visitors"	The Visitors – (POLS 342)
1982	POS 1318	"The Day Before You Came" "Cassandra"	The Singles: The First Ten Years – (POLS 400-401)
1983	POS 1321	"Under Attack" "You Owe Me One"	The Singles: The First Ten Years – (POLS 400-401)
1986	—	—N/a —	ABBA Live – (POLS 412)
The above listing includes all of ABBA's original Polar Music releases (1970s and 1980s).

== See also ==
- List of record labels
- Polar Studios, a recording studio founded by Stig Anderson, Björn Ulvaeus, and Benny Andersson
