= Henrik Sylvén =

Swedish film director

- Born: 11 June 1971

Henrik Wilhelm Sylvén (born 11 June 1971) is a Swedish film director and scriptwriter for films, television shows and commercials. He was born in Lidingö, Sweden. His first feature "Lovelife of a fat thief" was premiered in 2006.

== Filmography ==
- "Understatements" (writer, director) (short) (Swe 2003)
- "Lovelife of a fat thief" (Swedish title: Tjocktjuven) (writer, director) (2006)
- "Myggan" (staffwriter, director) (Television, Swe 2007-2008)
- "The Pact" (writer, director) (rumoured, Swe/Can 2010)
