= So Long (ABBA song) =

- Danish picture sleeve

Single by ABBA

from the album ABBA
- B-side: "I've Been Waiting for You"
- Released: 18 November 1974
- Recorded: 22–23 August 1974
- Studio: Glen Studio
- Genre: Rock and roll
- Length: 3:09
- Label: Polar (Sweden); Epic (UK)
- Songwriters: Björn Ulvaeus; Benny Andersson
- Producers: Björn Ulvaeus; Benny Andersson

ABBA singles chronology
"Hasta Mañana" (1974)	"So Long" (1974)	"I've Been Waiting for You" (1974)

Audio video
- "So Long" on YouTube

"So Long" is a song by Swedish pop group ABBA, released as the first single from their self-titled album ABBA. "So Long" was written and composed by Björn Ulvaeus and Benny Andersson, with lead vocals by Agnetha Fältskog and Anni-Frid Lyngstad.

Backed with "I've Been Waiting for You", another song from the same album, the single was a hit in some European countries, although failed to chart in the UK, despite TV promotion and relatively favourable reviews in the music press.

== Track listings ==
No.	Title	Writer(s)	Length
1.	"So Long"	Andersson; Ulvaeus	3:06
2.	"I've Been Waiting for You"	Andersson; Ulvaeus; Anderson	3:39

Australian single
No.	Title	Writer(s)	Length
1.	"So Long"	Andersson; Ulvaeus	3:06
2.	"Hasta Mañana"	Andersson; Ulvaeus; Anderson	3:09

== Personnel ==
ABBA

- Anni-Frid Lyngstad – lead and backing vocals
- Agnetha Fältskog – lead and backing vocals
- Björn Ulvaeus – backing vocals, rhythm guitar
- Benny Andersson – backing vocals, keyboards

Additional musicians and production staff

- Janne Schaffer– lead guitar
- Mike Watson – bass
- Ola Brunkert – drums

== Charts ==
Chart (1974–75)	Peak position
Austria (Ö3 Austria Top 40)	3
Belgium (Ultratop 50 Wallonia)	42
Denmark (Danmarks Radio)	8
Germany (GfK)	11
Sweden (Kvällstoppen)	7

== Release history ==
Region	Date	Title	Label	Format	Catalog
Sweden, Denmark, Norway	18 Nov 1974	"So Long" / "I’ve Been Waiting For You"	Polar	7-inch vinyl	POS 1195
UK	22 Nov 1974	"So Long" / "I’ve Been Waiting For You"	Epic	7-inch vinyl	S EPC 2848
Australia	25 Nov 1974	"So Long" / "I’ve Been Waiting For You"	RCA Victor	7-inch vinyl	102560
France	Nov 1974	"So Long" / "I’ve Been Waiting For You"	Révolution	7-inch vinyl	45 X 12026
Austria, Hong Kong, Portugal, Switzerland, West Germany	Nov 1974	"So Long" / "I’ve Been Waiting For You"	Polydor	7-inch vinyl	2040 131
Yugoslavia	3 Dec 1974	"So Long" / "I’ve Been Waiting For You"	Radio-Televizija Beograd	7-inch vinyl	S 53 810
Greece	1974	"So Long" / "I’ve Been Waiting For You"	Pan-Vox	7-inch vinyl	PAN 7590
New Zealand	1974	"So Long" / "I’ve Been Waiting For You"	Family Label	7-inch vinyl	FAY 1099
Peru	1974	"So Long" / "I’ve Been Waiting For You"	RCA Victor	7-inch vinyl	POS 1195
Spain	1975	"So Long" / "I’ve Been Waiting For You"	Carnaby	7-inch vinyl	MO 1461
Japan	1975	"So Long" / "I’ve Been Waiting For You"	Philips	7-inch vinyl	SFL-2011
