= Mike Watson (musician) =

British bassist (born 1946)

- Mike Watson in 1966

Background information
- Born: Michael Frank Watson; 31 December 1946 (age 79); Sheffield, England, UK
- Genre: Pop
- Instruments: Bass, vocals
- Years active: 1964–present
- Formerly of: ABBA

Michael Frank Watson (born 31 December 1946) is a British bass player. He was the bassist for ABBA from 1972 to 1980.

== Early life ==
Watson was born in Sheffield at 23:57pm on New Year's Eve 1946. When his parents divorced in 1951, Watson's mother controversially left with a black entertainer.

Watson grew up in his aunt Rose's boarding school, during which his mother and her new partner toured the U.S. military bases in Germany. In 1958, at age eleven, his mother took him to Germany to sing in The Nicholls family show. His first ever performance, according to his diary entry, was on 28 June 1958 in Bad Kreuznach, where he sang two Little Richard songs, "Tutti Frutti" and "Rip It Up" under the name Little Mike; he received a one dollar tip.

== Career ==
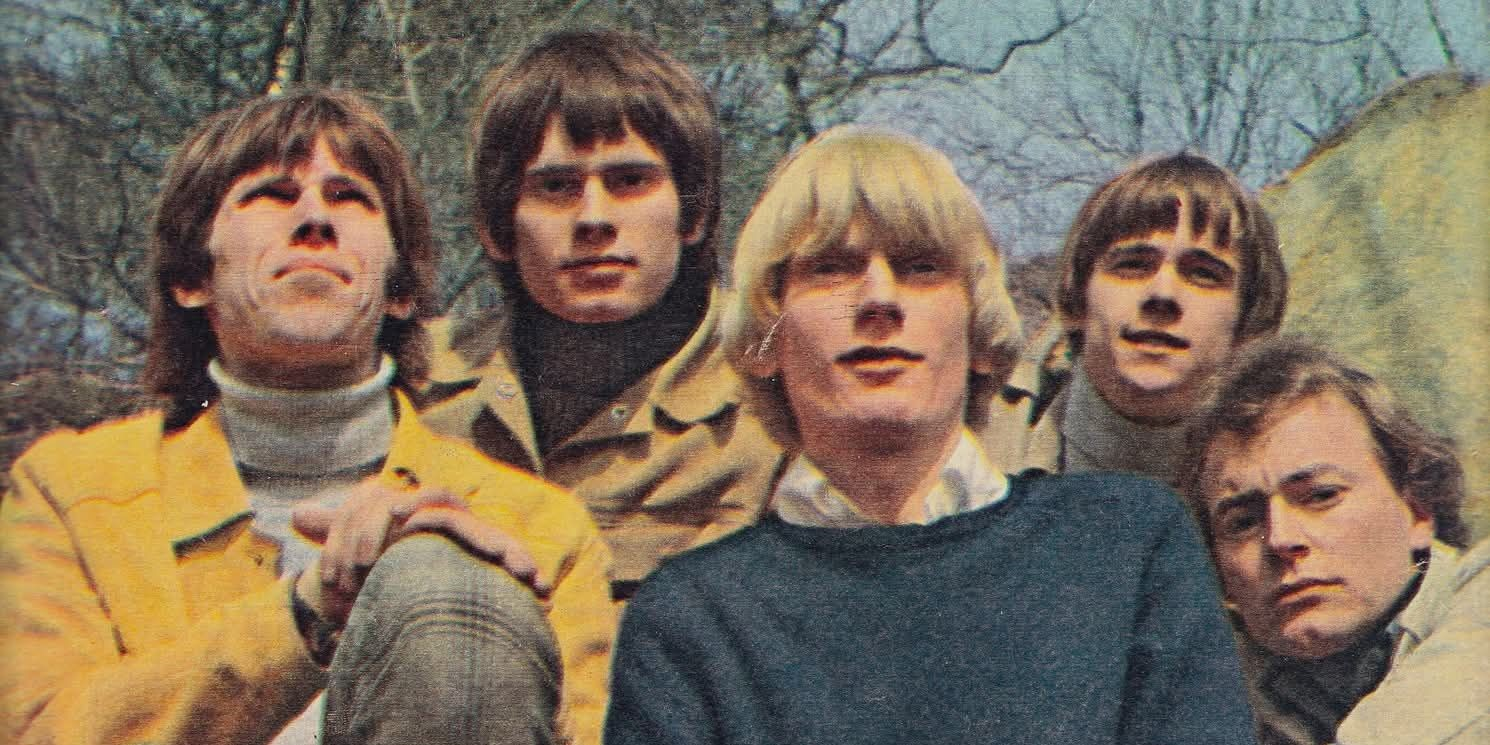
Mike Watson (second from right) as part of the Lee Kings in 1966.

In 1964, eighteen year old Watson went on tour with Larry Finnegan as a member of the London-based group Hi-Grades to Sweden; he and another member of the band enjoyed the stay so much they permanently moved there. He was a member of The Lee Kings and Lasse Samuelsson's Dynamite Brass. He first met Benny Andersson and Björn Ulvaeus in the mid 60s.

In 1969 Watson began working as a session musician. In July 1971, Watson did his first ABBA-related studio session when he played bass on a solo record recorded by Anni-Frid Lyngstad and produced by Andersson. A year later he played bass on "People Need Love", ABBA's first single then released under the name "Björn & Benny, Agnetha & Anni-Frid".

When ABBA became successful, Watson became their most frequent bass player, and played bass on most of their songs made from 1972 to 1980, including "SOS", "Mamma Mia", "If It Wasn’t for the Nights", "The Winner Takes It All", "Gimme! Gimme! Gimme!", and "Super Trouper". He is also the man dressed up as Napoleon on the cover of their Waterloo album (according to Mike he was specifically asked to do it as he was the shortest member of their backing band).

After ABBA split up, Watson worked a session player and led the "Stockholm All Stars" in the 1980s. He now makes guest appearances in the ABBA tribute band, Arrival.

== Personal life ==
Watson has lived in Sweden since 1965, the same year he married his first wife, Maria Pereboom (Suzie), who was a popular Swedish pop singer. Their marriage did not last long.

== Discography ==
ABBA albums

- Ring Ring (1973)
- ABBA (1975)
- Voulez-Vous (1979)
- Super Trouper (1980)

Albums for others

- Out Of My Hair — Claes Af Geijerstam (1970)
- Undringar — Ted Gärdestad (1972)
- Ted — Ted Gärdestad (1973)
- Amazing Grace På Mitt Sätt — Lennart Sjöholm (1975)
- Anders Glenmark — Anders Glenmark (1975)
- Hadar — Hadar (1975)
- Letters — Svenne & Lotta (1976)
- At Your Service — Paul Paljett (1978)
- Bonny — Bonny Lindqvist (1978)
- J.C. Barreto — J.C. Barreto (1979)
- Det Är En Härlig Feeling — Svenne & Lotta (1979)
- Low Budget Blues Band — Low Budget Blues Band (1982)
