= Mamma Mia (ABBA song) =

1975 single by ABBA

- Danish picture sleeve

Single by ABBA

from the album ABBA
- B-side: "Intermezzo No. 1"; "Hey, Hey Helen" (Australia); "Tropical Loveland" (UK, Canada, US)
- Released: September 1975
- Recorded: 12 March 1975
- Studio: Metronome, Stockholm, Sweden
- Genre: Europop; pop rock
- Length: 3:35
- Label: Polar (Denmark); Epic (UK); Atlantic (Canada, US); Carnaby (Spain); Polydor (Austria, Germany, Netherlands, Portugal, Switzerland); RCA Victor (Australia); Disques Vogue (Belgium)
- Songwriters: Benny Andersson; Björn Ulvaeus; Stig Anderson
- Producers: Benny Andersson; Björn Ulvaeus

ABBA singles chronology
"SOS" (1975)	"Mamma Mia" (1975)	"Rock Me" (1976)

Music video
- "Mamma Mia" on YouTube

"Mamma Mia" is a song by the Swedish pop group ABBA, written by Benny Andersson, Björn Ulvaeus and Stig Anderson, with the lead vocals shared by Agnetha Fältskog and Anni-Frid Lyngstad. It is the opening track on the group's third album, the self-titled ABBA (1975). The song was released in September 1975 as its sixth single. It tells the story of the narrator's on-again, off-again relationship with a lover who is repeatedly unfaithful to her. The song's name is derived from Italian and literally translates as "my mother", but is used as an interjection (Mamma mia!) in situations of surprise, anguish, or excitement. The song was ABBA's first number one in the UK since "Waterloo" in 1974.

== History and impact ==
The distinctive sound at the start of the song is the marimba. According to biographer Carl Magnus Palm, the instrument was incorporated at the last minute, added after Benny Andersson found it in the studio and decided its "tick tock" rhythm was perfect for the track.

"Mamma Mia" was written at the home of Agnetha Fältskog and Björn Ulvaeus, and was the last track recorded for the album ABBA. It was one of four songs from the album to have a music video made to promote the album. Initially, however, "Mamma Mia" was never intended for release as a single. Around this time, many artists were recording ABBA songs (such as "Honey, Honey" and "Bang a Boomerang"). ABBA offered "Mamma Mia" to British pop group Brotherhood of Man, who turned it down.

"I Do, I Do, I Do, I Do, I Do" topped the Australian charts for three weeks; however, the promo clip for "Mamma Mia" proved the more popular after repeat screenings on Australian television, notably on the show Countdown. ABBA's Australian record company, RCA, asked that "Mamma Mia" be released as a single but Polar Music refused, preferring them to release "SOS" first. However, Stig Anderson agreed to this; "Mamma Mia" was released in Australia in August 1975, where it spent 10 weeks at number one.

After this success in Australia, Epic Records in the United Kingdom took notice of ABBA for the first time since their Eurovision Song Contest winner "Waterloo". From then on, Epic began to heavily promote ABBA's singles with the immediate result of "SOS" reaching the Top 10 in the British market, their first hit since "Waterloo". "Mamma Mia" soon followed, reaching number one in the UK Singles Chart in January 1976, the second of ABBA's 18 consecutive Top 10 singles there.

The B-side for the Australian release of "Mamma Mia" was "Hey, Hey Helen". In most other countries the B-side was the instrumental "Intermezzo Number 1". ABBA's British label Epic selected "Tropical Loveland" as the B-side for the UK release, believing another vocal track, especially one showcasing ABBA in a different musical style, would better promote the parent album.

As of September 2021, it is ABBA's seventh-biggest song in the UK with 860,000 chart sales (pure sales and digital streams).

== Critical reception ==
Sue Byrom of Record Mirror praised the track as "very jolly and catchy; not as catchy as "SOS", but a hit nonetheless." Cash Box said the single was "an example of [ABBA's] excellent musical taste," stating that the "tune is upbeat, with characteristically varied textures." Record World said that "the reason [the song is a worldwide smash] should be self-explanatory after just one listen."

In 2017, Billboard ranked "Mamma Mia" number seven on their list of the 15 greatest ABBA songs, and in 2021, Rolling Stone ranked the song number five on their list of the 25 greatest ABBA songs.

== Track listings ==
=== International single ===
A-side
No.	Title	Writer(s)	Length
1.	"Mamma Mia"	Andersson; Ulvaeus; Stig Anderson	3:32

B-side
No.	Title	Writer(s)	Length
2.	"Intermezzo No. 1"	Andersson; Ulvaeus	3:48

=== UK single ===
A-side
No.	Title	Writer(s)	Length
1.	"Mamma Mia"	Andersson; Ulvaeus; Stig Anderson	3:32

B-side
No.	Title	Writer(s)	Length
2.	"Tropical Loveland"	Andersson; Ulvaeus; Anderson	3:05

== Personnel ==
- Anni-Frid Lyngstad – lead and backing vocals
- Agnetha Fältskog – lead and backing vocals
- Björn Ulvaeus – rhythm guitar and backing vocals
- Benny Andersson – piano, marimba, Hammond organ and backing vocals
- Janne Schaffer – lead guitar
- Mike Watson – bass guitar
- Roger Palm – drums

== Charts ==
=== Weekly charts ===
Initial weekly chart performance for "Mamma Mia"
Chart (1975–76)	Peak position
Australia (Kent Music Report)	1
Austria (Ö3 Austria Top 40)	3
Belgium (Ultratop 50 Flanders)	2
Belgium (Ultratop 50 Wallonia)	6
Canada (Steede Report)	20
Canada Adult Contemporary (RPM)	11
Canada Top Singles (RPM)	18
Finland (Suomen virallinen lista)	16
Ireland (IRMA)	1
Italy (Billboard)	3
Netherlands (Dutch Top 40)	13
Netherlands (Single Top 100)	12
New Zealand (Recorded Music NZ)	2
Norway (VG-lista)	2
South Africa (Springbok)	7
Switzerland (Schweizer Hitparade)	1
UK Singles (Official Charts)	1
US Billboard Hot 100	32
US Adult Contemporary (Billboard)	12
US Cashbox Top 100	36
West Germany (GfK)	1
Yugoslavia (Radio TV Revue and Studio)	4

2006–2009 weekly chart performance for "Mamma Mia"
Chart (2006–2009)	Peak position
Australia (ARIA)	48
CIS Airplay (TopHit)	167
Italy (FIMI)	12
Russia Airplay (TopHit)	158
Spain (Promusicae)	48
Switzerland (Schweizer Hitparade)	60
UK Singles (Official Charts)	56

2021 weekly chart performance for "Mamma Mia"
Chart (2021)	Peak position
Sweden (Sverigetopplistan)	64

=== Year-end charts ===
1975 year-end chart performance for "Mamma Mia"
Chart (1975)	Position
Australia (Kent Music Report)	3

1976 year-end chart performance for "Mamma Mia"
Chart (1976)	Position
Australia (Kent Music Report)	28
Canada Top Singles (RPM)	147
New Zealand (RIANZ)	16
UK Singles (OCC)	21

== Certifications and sales ==
Region	Certification	Certified units/sales
Australia (ARIA)	3× Gold	150,000^{^}
Denmark (IFPI Danmark)	Platinum	90,000^{‡}
Germany (BVMI)	Gold	250,000^{‡}
Italy (FIMI) sales since 2009	Gold	15,000^{‡}
Kenya	—	10,000
New Zealand (RMNZ)	3× Platinum	90,000^{‡}
Portugal	—	20,000
Spain (Promusicae)	Platinum	60,000^{‡}
United Kingdom (BPI)	2× Platinum	2,000,000^{‡}
Yugoslavia	Silver	55,000
United States	—	193,000
Summaries
Europe	—	3,500,000
^{^} Shipments figures based on certification alone.^{‡} Sales+streaming figures based on certification alone.

== A-Teens version ==
"Mamma Mia"

Single by A-Teens

from the album The ABBA Generation
- Released: 30 April 1999
- Studio: Jam Lab (Gothenburg, Sweden); Hitsville (Halden, Norway)
- Length: 3:44
- Label: Stockholm
- Songwriters: Benny Andersson; Stig Anderson; Björn Ulvaeus
- Producer: Ole Evenrude

A-Teens singles chronology
"Mamma Mia" (1999)	"Super Trouper" (1999)

Music video
- "Mamma Mia" on YouTube

Swedish pop group A-Teens released their version of "Mamma Mia" as their debut single on 30 April 1999 through Stockholm Records. It is from their debut album, The ABBA Generation (1999). Upon its release, it became a hit in Sweden, where it peaked at number one and stayed there for eight consecutive weeks, earning a quadruple platinum certification. On initial pressings of the single, the name of the group appeared as ABBA-Teens, but Stockholm Records thought it would be better to change the name of the band to A-Teens, so new pressings of the single were made.

=== Commercial performance ===
The single reached the top 20 in several European countries, reaching number three in Norway, number nine in Switzerland and the Netherlands, number 10 in Germany, number 12 in the United Kingdom, and number 14 in Austria and Finland. A Spanish version of the song was recorded for promotion in Latin America and Spain. Despite the worldwide success, the song failed to attract the Australian public, peaking at 72 on the ARIA Singles Chart, although it did reach number 13 in New Zealand. In the United States, the single peaked at number 63 on the Billboard Hot Single Sales chart, becoming the band's first single to chart in the country.

=== Music video ===
The accompanying music video was directed by Henrik Sylvén and was filmed in Sweden. It shows the A-Teens as waiters at an art exposition, and they are suppressed by the manager; but soon they discover that one of the paintings transports them to a party where the manager and patrons he is helping also join in on the fun.

=== Track listings ===
- European CD single
1. "Mamma Mia" (radio version) – 3:43
2. "Mamma Mia" (extended version) – 5:48
- European maxi-CD single and Australian CD single
1. "Mamma Mia" (radio version) – 3:43
2. "Mamma Mia" (Giuseppe remix) – 5:35
3. "Mamma Mia" (Jam Lab remix) – 3:56
4. "Mamma Mia" (extended version) – 5:48
- UK CD1
1. "Mamma Mia" (radio version) – 3:45
2. "Lay All Your Love on Me" – 4:04
3. "Mamma Mia" (karaoke version) – 3:45
4. "Mamma Mia" (CD-ROM video)
- UK CD2
1. "Mamma Mia" (extended version) – 5:48
2. "Mamma Mia" (The Bold & The Beautiful Glamourmix edit) – 3:46
3. "Mamma Mia" (Trouser Enthusiasts' Undying dub) – 9:20
- UK cassette single
1. "Mamma Mia" (radio version) – 3:45
2. "Mamma Mia" (karaoke version) – 3:45
- US CD and cassette single
1. "Mamma Mia" (album version) – 3:43
2. "Mamma Mia" (extended version) – 5:48

=== Charts ===
==== Weekly charts ====
Weekly chart performance for the A*Teens cover
Chart (1999–2000)	Peak position
Australia (ARIA)	95
Austria (Ö3 Austria Top 40)	14
Belgium (Ultratop 50 Flanders)	10
Canada Adult Contemporary (RPM)	74
Denmark (IFPI)	1
Europe (Eurochart Hot 100)	22
Finland (Suomen virallinen lista)	14
Finland (Suomen virallinen singlelista)	9
France (SNEP)	51
Germany (GfK)	10
Iceland (Íslenski Listinn Topp 40)	20
Netherlands (Dutch Top 40)	9
Netherlands (Single Top 100)	7
New Zealand (Recorded Music NZ)	13
Norway (VG-lista)	3
Scottish Singles Sales (Official Charts)	10
Spain (Promusicae)	6
Sweden (Sverigetopplistan)	1
Switzerland (Schweizer Hitparade)	9
UK Singles (Official Charts)	12
US Hot Singles Sales (Billboard)	63

==== Year-end charts ====
Year-end chart performance for the A*Teens
Chart (1999)	Position
Belgium (Ultratop 50 Flanders)	51
Europe Border Breakers (Music & Media)	37
Europe (Eurochart Hot 100)	65
Netherlands (Dutch Top 40)	69
Netherlands (Single Top 100)	59
Sweden (Hitlistan)	1

=== Certifications ===
Certifications and sales for the A*Teens cover
Region	Certification	Certified units/sales
Norway (IFPI Norway)	Gold	
Sweden (GLF)	4× Platinum	120,000^{^}
^{^} Shipments figures based on certification alone.

=== Release history ===
Release dates and formats for the A*Teens cover
Region	Date	Format(s)	Label(s)	Ref.
Sweden	30 April 1999	CD	Stockholm	
United Kingdom	23 August 1999	CD; cassette	Stockholm	
United States	28 September 1999	Contemporary hit radio	MCA	
Japan	1 October 1999	CD	Polydor; Stockholm	

== Mamma Mia! version ==
"Mamma Mia" was recorded by Meryl Streep for the soundtrack of Mamma Mia!. Her version was released on 8 July 2008 alongside the rest of the soundtrack, by Decca and Polydor Records. It was produced by Benny Andersson.

=== Charts ===
Chart performance for Mamma Mia!'s "Mamma Mia"
Chart (2008)	Peak position
Australia (ARIA)	98
Norway (VG-lista)	17
Sweden (Sverigetopplistan)	55
UK Singles (Official Charts)	96
US Billboard Hot 100	99

=== Certifications ===
Certifications and sales for Mamma Mia's "Mamma Mia"
Region	Certification	Certified units/sales
United Kingdom (BPI)	Silver	200,000^{‡}
^{‡} Sales+streaming figures based on certification alone.

== Mamma Mia! Here We Go Again version ==
Lily James, Jessica Keenan Wynn and Alexa Davies recorded "Mamma Mia" for the soundtrack of Mamma Mia! Here We Go Again. Their version was released on 13 July 2018 alongside the rest of the soundtrack, by Capitol and Polydor Records. It was produced by Benny Andersson.

=== Charts ===
Chart performance for "Mamma Mia" (Here We Go Again!)
Chart (2018)	Peak position
Ireland (IRMA)	49
New Zealand Hot Singles (RMNZ)	21
Scottish Singles Sales (Official Charts)	54
UK Singles (Official Charts)	57

=== Certifications ===
Certifications for "Mamma Mia" (Here We Go Again!)
Region	Certification	Certified units/sales
United Kingdom (BPI)	Silver	200,000^{‡}
^{‡} Sales+streaming figures based on certification alone.
