= ABBA (album) =

1975 studio album by ABBA

Studio album by ABBA
- Released: 21 April 1975
- Recorded: 22 August 1974 – 16 March 1975
- Studios: Glen, Metronome and Ljudkopia (Stockholm, Sweden)
- Genres: Pop; pop rock
- Length: 36:09
- Labels: Polar; Epic; Atlantic
- Producers: Benny Andersson; Björn Ulvaeus

ABBA chronology
Waterloo (1974)	ABBA (1975)	The Best of ABBA (1975)

Singles from ABBA
- 1. "So Long" Released: 18 November 1974; 2. "I've Been Waiting for You" Released: 18 November 1974; 3. "I Do, I Do, I Do, I Do, I Do" Released: 10 April 1975; 4. "Bang-A-Boomerang" Released: 21 April 1975; 5. "SOS" Released: 3 June 1975; 6. "Mamma Mia" Released: 30 August 1975; 7. "Rock Me" Released: April 1976

Professional ratings
Review scores
Source	Rating
AllMusic	4/5 stars
The Encyclopedia of Popular Music	3/5 stars
Ondarock	7/10
The Rolling Stone Album Guide	4/5 stars

ABBA is the third studio album by the Swedish pop group ABBA. It was originally released on 21 April 1975 through Polar Music and features the hits "SOS", "I Do, I Do, I Do, I Do, I Do" and "Mamma Mia". The album topped the charts in Australia, Norway, Sweden and reached the top ten in the Netherlands, Finland, Italy, and New Zealand.

== Overview ==
Following the Eurovision success of "Waterloo", ABBA saw the band gaining worldwide recognition. "I Do, I Do, I Do, I Do, I Do" topped the charts in Australia, as did "Mamma Mia" shortly after. "SOS" and "Mamma Mia" became hits in both the United States and the United Kingdom. The album saw ABBA dabble with reggae on "Tropical Loveland" and includes a grand, pseudo-classical keyboard instrumental in the traditions of Keith Emerson and Rick Wakeman with "Intermezzo No. 1" (early working title: "Mama").

ABBA was first released on CD in Japan in 1986 by Polydor Records. This release contains a slightly different mix of "Man in the Middle" not found on any subsequent CD pressing and thus is highly sought after by collectors. ABBA was released on CD throughout Europe in 1987 also by Polydor, with five songs added from the Waterloo and Ring Ring albums, which were not available on CD until 1990. ABBA was released on CD in Sweden by Polar Music in 1988, featuring the original 11 tracks only. The album has been reissued in digitally remastered form several times: in 1997 as part of "The ABBA Remasters" series with two bonus tracks, in 2001 with updated cover artwork incorporating their ambigram, first used for their next album Arrival, in 2005 as part of The Complete Studio Recordings box set, and most recently in 2012 as a "Deluxe Edition".

On the original UK cassette release of the album, "Bang-A-Boomerang" was split in two parts, being faded during the second verse at the end of side one and continued at the beginning of side two.

Disc magazine gave the album a mixed review on release, saying that ABBA were a good singles band but were "a mediocre albums band". It said "on the good side there are ultra-poppy tracks 'Bang a Boomerang', "I Do" and the excellent 'So Long'", but said "the other material isn't worth mentioning" (completely ignoring future hits "SOS" and "Mamma Mia"). They awarded it one star out of four. Another mixed review was given in Record Mirror which did mention "SOS" and said it would make a good single. It said that it was more adventurous than Waterloo but said it was "patchy in parts" and "flash, pash pop for under fifteens".

On 19 November 2012, ABBA was reissued as part of the Deluxe Edition series with a two-disc package. The first disc, a CD with special remastered audio, featured the original album with three bonus tracks. The second one, a DVD, contained 60 minutes of previously unreleased TV performances, including: the complete 41-minute ABBA In Australia 1976 television special, in which the band performed twelve songs; performances of "Mamma Mia", "I Do, I Do, I Do, I Do, I Do", and "So Long" from the SVT 1975 special Made In Sweden – For Export; a 1975 performance of "SOS" from the Seaside Special; a 1976 performance of "Mamma Mia" from Top of the Pops; two television commercials for The Best of ABBA and Greatest Hits; and the "International Sleeve Gallery". A 24-page illustrated booklet with an essay on the making of the album was also included.

Jude Rogers of the BBC said that, with this deluxe reissue of the album, "ABBA doubters will be pleasantly surprised to find the band's desire to experiment here" and that "long-term fans will enjoy the accompanying DVD, and be reminded of an interesting juncture in the quartet's career".

== Track listing ==
All tracks are written by Benny Andersson, Björn Ulvaeus, and Stig Anderson; except where noted.

Side one
No.	Title	Writer(s)	Length
1.	"Mamma Mia"		3:32
2.	"Hey, Hey Helen"	Andersson; Ulvaeus	3:16
3.	"Tropical Loveland"		3:05
4.	"SOS"		3:22
5.	"Man in the Middle"	Andersson; Ulvaeus	3:00
6.	"Bang-A-Boomerang"		3:02

Side two
No.	Title	Writer(s)	Length
1.	"I Do, I Do, I Do, I Do, I Do"		3:15
2.	"Rock Me"	Andersson; Ulvaeus	3:03
3.	"Intermezzo No. 1" (featuring Benny Andersson; instrumental)	Andersson; Ulvaeus	3:48
4.	"I've Been Waiting for You"		3:39
5.	"So Long"	Andersson; Ulvaeus	3:06
Total length:			36:08

2012 deluxe edition bonus tracks
No.	Title	Writer(s)	Length
1.	"Crazy World"	Andersson; Ulvaeus	3:46
2.	"Medley: Pick a Bale of Cotton - On Top of Old Smokey - Midnight Special"	Traditional; arranged by Andersson and Ulvaeus	4:21
3.	"Mamma Mia" (Spanish version)	Andersson; Anderson; Ulvaeus; Buddy McCluskey; Mary McCluskey	3:34

== Personnel ==
Adapted from the original album's liner notes.

ABBA

- Agnetha Fältskog – lead vocals (4, 10), co-lead vocals (1, 2, 6, 7, 11), backing vocals
- Anni-Frid Lyngstad – lead vocals (3), co-lead vocals (1, 2, 6, 7, 11), backing vocals
- Björn Ulvaeus – guitars, lead vocals (5, 8), backing vocals
- Benny Andersson – piano, clavinet, marimba, synthesizer, vocals

Additional musicians

- Janne Schaffer – guitars
- Finn Sjöberg – guitars
- Lasse Wellander – guitars
- Rutger Gunnarsson – bass guitar
- Mike Watson – bass guitar
- Ola Brunkert – drums
- Roger Palm – drums
- Bruno Glenmark – trumpet (11)
- Ulf Andersson – tenor saxophone (5), alto saxophone (7)

Production

- Benny Andersson; Björn Ulvaeus – producers, arrangers
- Michael B. Tretow – engineer
- Sven-Olof Walldoff – string arrangements (1)
- Björn J:son Lindh – string and horn arrangements (9), tenor saxophone arrangement (5)
- Ola Lager – cover photograph
- Sten-Åke Magnusson – album design

== Charts ==
=== Weekly charts ===
Initial weekly chart performance for ABBA
Chart (1975–77)	Peak position
Australian Albums (Kent Music Report)	1
Canada Top Albums/CDs (RPM)	55
Dutch Albums (Album Top 100)	3
Finnish Albums (Suomen virallinen lista)	5
German Albums (Offizielle Top 100)	31
Italian Albums (Musica e dischi)	9
New Zealand Albums (RMNZ)	3
Norwegian Albums (VG-lista)	1
Swedish Albums (Sverigetopplistan)	1
UK Albums (Official Charts)	13
US Billboard 200	174
US Top 200 Albums (Cash Box)	165

2013–2015 weekly chart performance for ABBA
Chart (2013)	Peak position
Swedish Albums (Sverigetopplistan)	39
UK Album Downloads (Official Charts)	61

2021–2022 weekly chart performance for ABBA
Chart (2021–2022)	Peak position
Scottish Albums (Official Charts)	30
Swedish Albums (Sverigetopplistan)	26

2024–2025 weekly chart performance for ABBA
Chart (2024–2025)	Peak position
Belgian Albums (Ultratop Flanders)	187
German Albums (Offizielle Top 100)	51
Greek Albums (IFPI)	53
Scottish Albums (Official Charts)	50
Swiss Albums (Schweizer Hitparade)	78

=== Monthly charts ===
Monthly chart performance for ABBA
Chart (1978)	Position
Soviet Albums (Moskovskij Komsomolets)	1

=== Year-end charts ===
1975 year-end chart performance for ABBA
Chart (1975)	Position
Australian Albums (Kent Music Report)	19
Dutch Albums (Album Top 100)	18
New Zealand Albums (RMNZ)	10

1976 year-end chart performance for ABBA
Chart (1976)	Position
Australian Albums (Kent Music Report)	3
New Zealand Albums (RMNZ)	23

1977 year-end chart performance for ABBA
Chart (1977)	Position
New Zealand Albums (RMNZ)	34

1978 year-end chart performance for ABBA
Chart (1978)	Position
Soviet Albums (Moskovskij Komsomolets)	1

== Sales and certifications ==
Region	Certification	Certified units/sales
Australia	—	570,000
Denmark (IFPI Danmark)	Gold	10,000^{‡}
Finland (Musiikkituottajat)	Gold	25,358
Hong Kong (IFPI Hong Kong)	Gold	10,000^{*}
Japan	—	220,000
Norway	—	120,000
Sweden	—	474,642
United Kingdom (BPI)	Gold	100,000^{^}
Summaries
Europe	—	4,000,000
^{*} Sales figures based on certification alone.^{^} Shipments figures based on certification alone.^{‡} Sales+streaming figures based on certification alone.
