= Mamma Mia! (musical) =

1999 musical based on the songs of ABBA

- West End promotional poster
- Music: Benny Andersson; Björn Ulvaeus
- Lyrics: Benny Andersson; Björn Ulvaeus
- Book: Catherine Johnson
- Basis: ABBA discography
- Premiere: 6 April 1999: Prince Edward Theatre, London
- Productions: 1999 West End; 2000 1st North America tour 2001 Broadway; 2002 2nd North America tour 2016 1st UK tour 2016 3rd North America tour 2019 2nd UK tour 2023 25th Anniversary US tour 2025 Broadway revival

Mamma Mia! (promoted as Benny Andersson & Björn Ulvaeus' Mamma Mia!) is a jukebox musical written by British playwright Catherine Johnson, based on songs recorded by Swedish group ABBA and composed by members Benny Andersson and Björn Ulvaeus. The musical's title is taken from the group's 1975 chart-topper "Mamma Mia". Ulvaeus and Andersson were involved in the development of the show from the beginning, while singer Anni-Frid Lyngstad was involved financially in the production and also appeared at many of the premieres around the world.

The musical includes hits such as "Super Trouper", "Lay All Your Love on Me", "Dancing Queen", "Knowing Me, Knowing You", "Take a Chance on Me", "Thank You for the Music", "Money, Money, Money", "The Winner Takes It All", "Voulez-Vous", "SOS" and "Mamma Mia". Over 70 million people have seen the show, which has grossed $4.5 billion worldwide since its 1999 debut. A film adaptation starring Meryl Streep, Colin Firth, Pierce Brosnan, Amanda Seyfried, Christine Baranski, Stellan Skarsgård and Julie Walters was released in 2008.

As of 2024, the show has productions in London's West End, where it is the fifth longest-running show in West End history and the third longest-running musical, as well as various foreign productions. Its Broadway incarnation closed on 12 September 2015 after running for nearly 14 years, making it the ninth longest-running show in Broadway history.

== Background ==
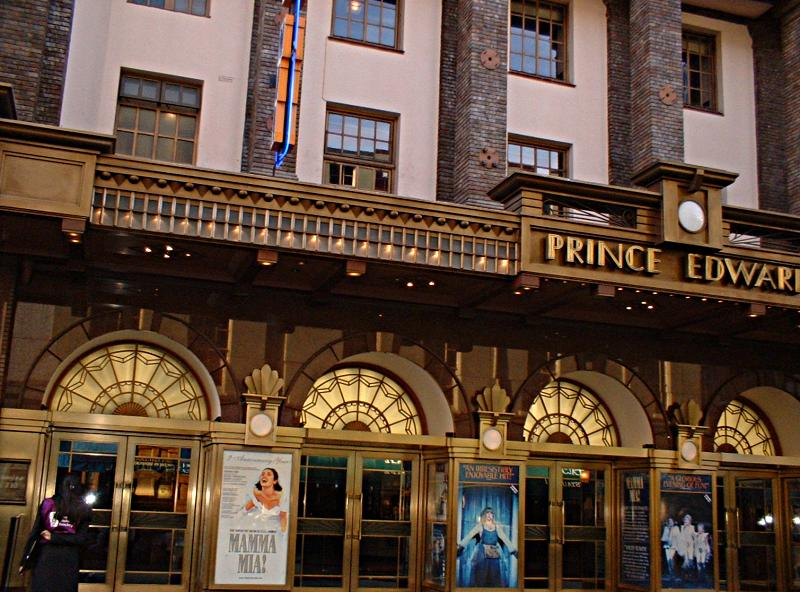
The original home of Mamma Mia! The Prince Edward Theatre

Mamma Mia! is based on the songs of ABBA, a Swedish pop/dance group active from 1972 to 1982 and one of the most popular international pop groups of all time, repeatedly topping the charts in Europe, North and South America and Australia. Following the premiere of the musical in London in 1999, ABBA Gold topped the charts in the United Kingdom again. Producer Judy Craymer met songwriters Björn Ulvaeus and Benny Andersson in 1983 when they were working with Tim Rice on Chess. It was the song "The Winner Takes It All" that suggested to her the theatrical potential of their pop songs. Though unenthusiastic, the duo were not completely opposed to the idea.

In 1997, Craymer commissioned Catherine Johnson to write the book for the musical. In 1998, Phyllida Lloyd became the director for the show.

Various reviewers have noted a similarity in the plot between Mamma Mia! and the 1968 film Buona Sera, Mrs. Campbell, previously adapted as the 1979 musical Carmelina, which is about a woman who does not know which of three men is her daughter's father. Critic John Simon speculated that Mamma Mia! is set in Greece and not Italy (which might have fit in better with the musical's title) to make the connection to the film less obvious. However, Johnson has denied being inspired by Buona Sera, Mrs. Campbell.

== Productions ==
=== Original West End production ===
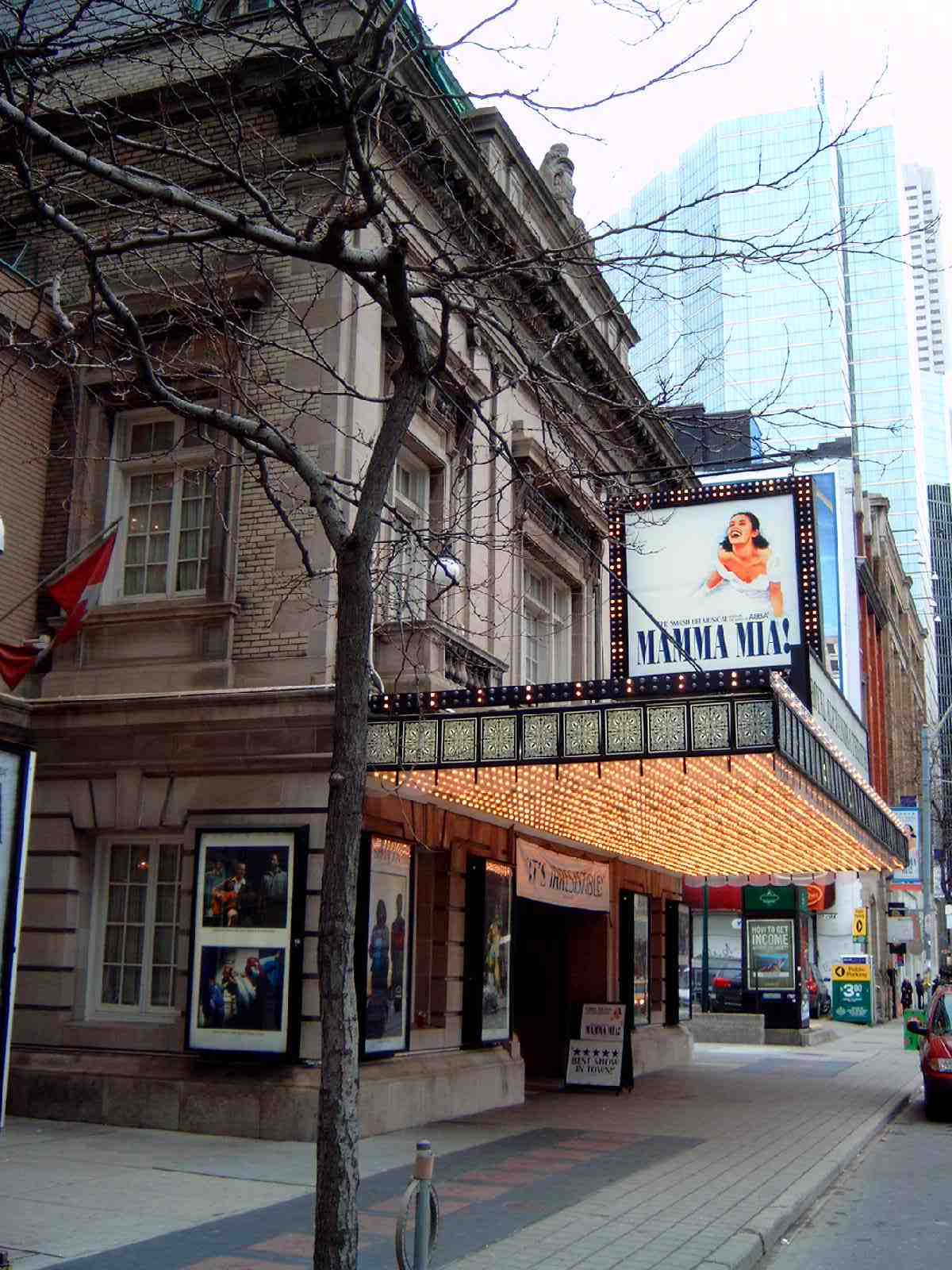
Mamma Mia! made its North American debut at the Royal Alexandra Theatre in Toronto

The musical opened in the West End at the Prince Edward Theatre on 6 April 1999, and transferred to the Prince of Wales Theatre on 9 June 2004, where it played until it moved to the Novello Theatre on 6 September 2012. Directed by Phyllida Lloyd with choreography by Anthony Van Laast, the original cast featured Siobhan McCarthy, Lisa Stokke, and Hilton McRae.

The show closed in March 2020 due to the COVID-19 pandemic in the United Kingdom, and reopened at the Novello Theatre on 25 August 2021. On 17 July 2024, Mamma Mia! celebrated its 10,000th performance in the West End.

In September 2026 the musical was licensed to schools and universities in the United Kingdom and Ireland for the first time, through Music Theatre International.

=== Original North American productions ===
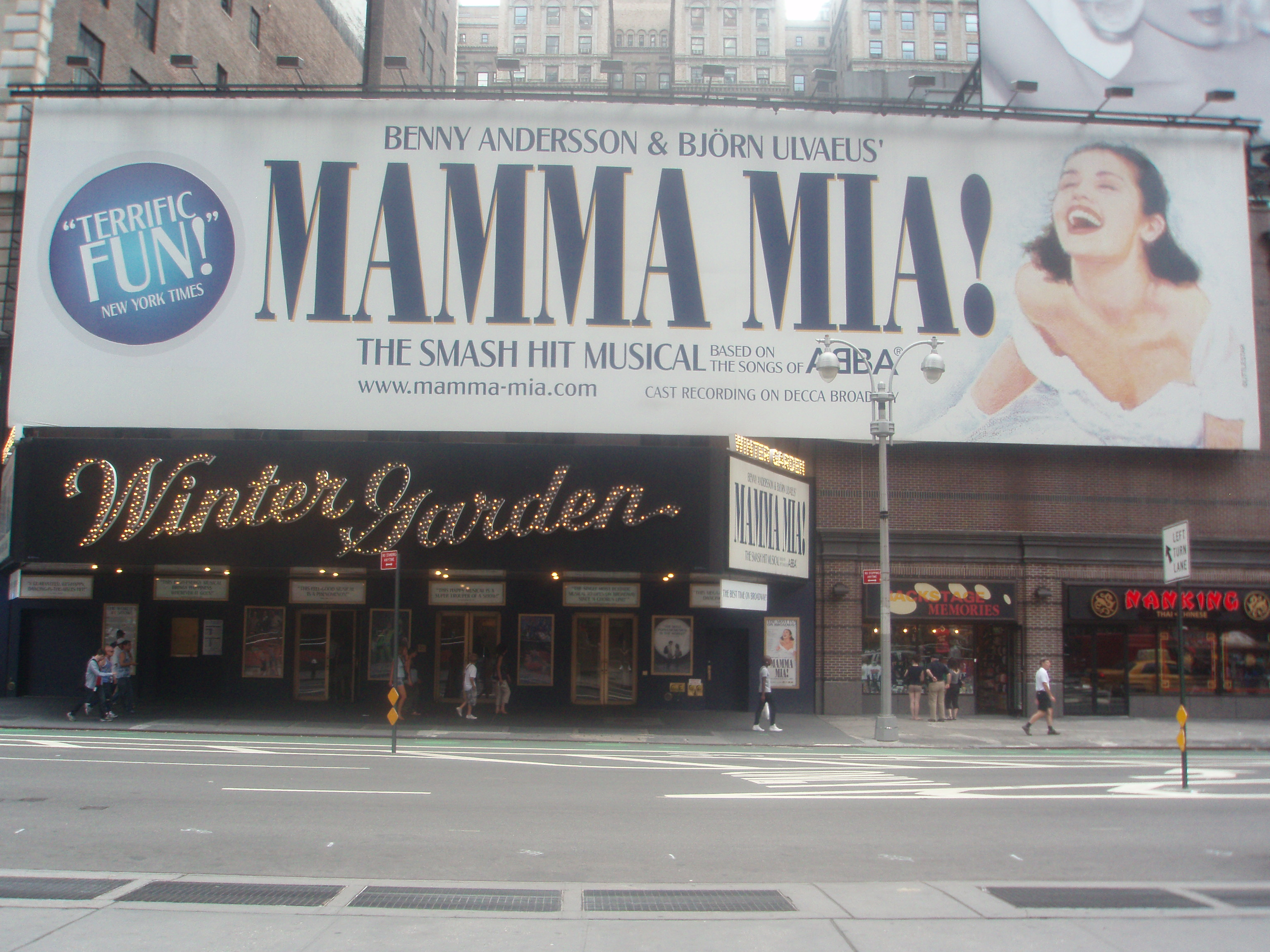
Mamma Mia! on Broadway

The first North American production, opening in Toronto at the Royal Alexandra Theatre in May 2000, played for five years. The US debut followed in San Francisco, California, at the Orpheum Theatre from 17 November 2000, to 17 February 2001, moving next to Los Angeles, California, at the Shubert Theatre from 26 February to 12 May 2001, and finally to Chicago, Illinois, at the Cadillac Palace Theatre from 13 May to 12 August 2001.

==== Broadway run ====
The musical opened on Broadway at the Winter Garden Theatre on 18 October 2001, after beginning previews on 5 October. The director was Phyllida Lloyd with choreography by Anthony Van Laast. As of October 2017, it was the ninth longest-running Broadway show and the longest-running jukebox musical in Broadway history. On 18 April 2013, it was announced that Mamma Mia! would transfer from its home at the Winter Garden Theatre to the Broadhurst Theatre later that year to make way for the musical adaptation of Rocky. The show played its final performance at the Winter Garden Theatre on 19 October 2013, and began performances at the Broadhurst Theatre on 2 November 2013.

It was announced on 9 April 2015, that the show would close on 5 September 2015. On 21 April 2015, it was then announced that the show would play an additional week and would instead close on 12 September 2015. Mamma Mia! played 5,773 performances on Broadway before closing.

==== 2025 Broadway revival ====
Mamma Mia! returned to Broadway for a limited six-month engagement from 2 August 2025 to 1 February 2026 at the Winter Garden Theatre, where it had played for twelve years previously before it transferred to the Broadhurst Theatre.

The production featured Christine Sherrill as Donna, Amy Weaver as Sophie, Carly Sakolove as Rosie, Jalynn Steele as Tanya, Rob Marnell as Harry Bright, Jim Newman as Bill Austin, Victor Wallace as Sam Carmichael and Grant Reynolds as Sky.

=== Foreign and touring productions ===
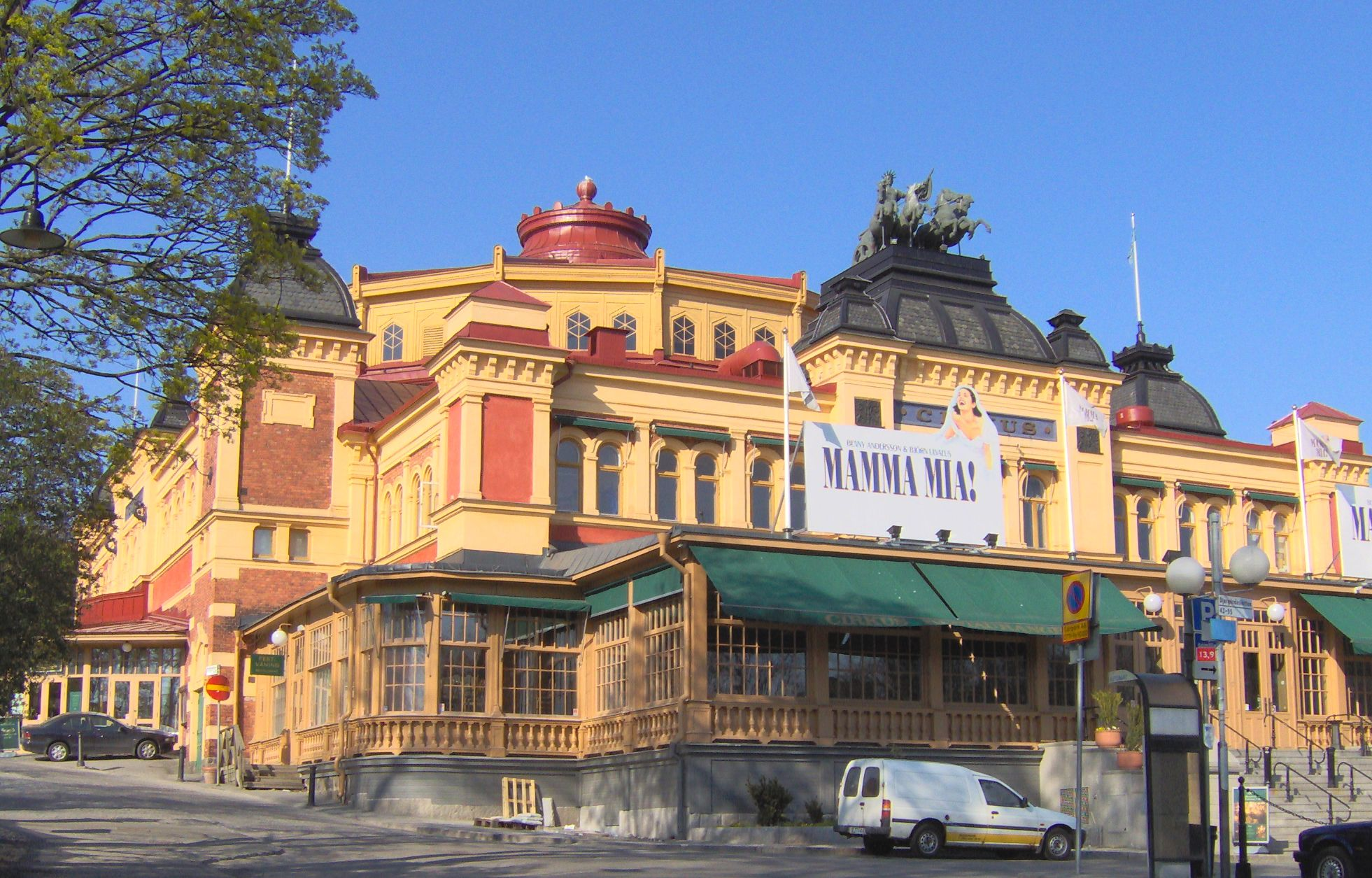
Cirkus in Stockholm

Mamma Mia! has been played in more than sixty countries in all six continents, including Argentina, Australia, Austria, Belgium, Brazil, Bulgaria, Canada, Chile, China, Colombia, Croatia, Czech Republic, Denmark, Dominican Republic, Germany, Estonia, Fiji, Finland, France, Greece, Guatemala, Hungary, Iceland, India, Indonesia, Ireland, Israel, Italy, Japan, Jordan, Latvia, Lithuania, Luxembourg, Malaysia, Malta, Mexico, Monaco, Netherlands, New Zealand, Norway, Panama, Peru, Philippines, Poland, Portugal, Qatar, Romania, Russia, Serbia, Singapore, Slovakia, Slovenia, South Africa, South Korea, Spain, Sri Lanka, Sweden, Switzerland, Taiwan, Thailand, Turkey, United Arab Emirates, United Kingdom, United States, and Venezuela, and has been translated into multiple languages. It has been performed in over 440 major cities and has been seen by over 70 million people worldwide, setting the record for premiering in more cities faster than any other musical in history.

The first city to produce the show after London was Toronto, where it ran from 23 May 2000, to 22 May 2005, being the North America premiere of Mamma Mia!. The original cast included Louise Pitre as Donna and Tina Maddigan as Sophie, who both of them later reprised their roles in first US Tour and Broadway premiere.

Mamma Mia! played in Las Vegas, opening at the Mandalay Bay in February 2003 and closing on 4 January 2009. In June 2005, Mamma Mia! played its 1,000th performance in Las Vegas, becoming the longest-running West End/Broadway musical in Las Vegas. The clothes and scenarios from this production are now used in Brazil. The show returned to Las Vegas on 16 May 2014, at the Tropicana Hotel & Casino, but announced its closing soon after on 22 July.

The first North American tour started in San Francisco, California, on 15 November 2000, and closed in Boston, Massachusetts, on 29 August 2004. A second national tour opened in Providence, Rhode Island, on 26 February 2002, and closed in Appleton, Wisconsin, on 26 August 2012. This was followed by a non-Equity tour that opened in Orange, Texas, on 28 September 2016, and closed in St. Louis, Missouri, on 30 July 2017. A 25th-anniversary Equity tour kicked off on 26 October 2023 in Elmira, New York.

The first non-English version of the show debuted in Hamburg at the Operettenhaus, where it ran from 3 November 2002, to 8 September 2007. With the productions of Stuttgart (2004) and Essen (2007), Mamma Mia! became the first major musical to play concurrently in three German cities.

The show has had (and in some cases, still has) permanent productions in London, Toronto, Melbourne, New York, Hamburg, Tokyo (later transferred to Osaka, Fukuoka and Nagoya), Las Vegas, Utrecht, Seoul (later transferred to Seongnam and Daegu), Stuttgart, Madrid (later transferred to Barcelona), Stockholm (later transferred to Gothenburg), Antwerp, Moscow, Essen, Berlin, Oslo, Mexico City, Milan (later transferred to Rome), Copenhagen (later transferred to Aarhus), Paris, São Paulo, Shanghai, Buenos Aires, Vienna and Helsinki.

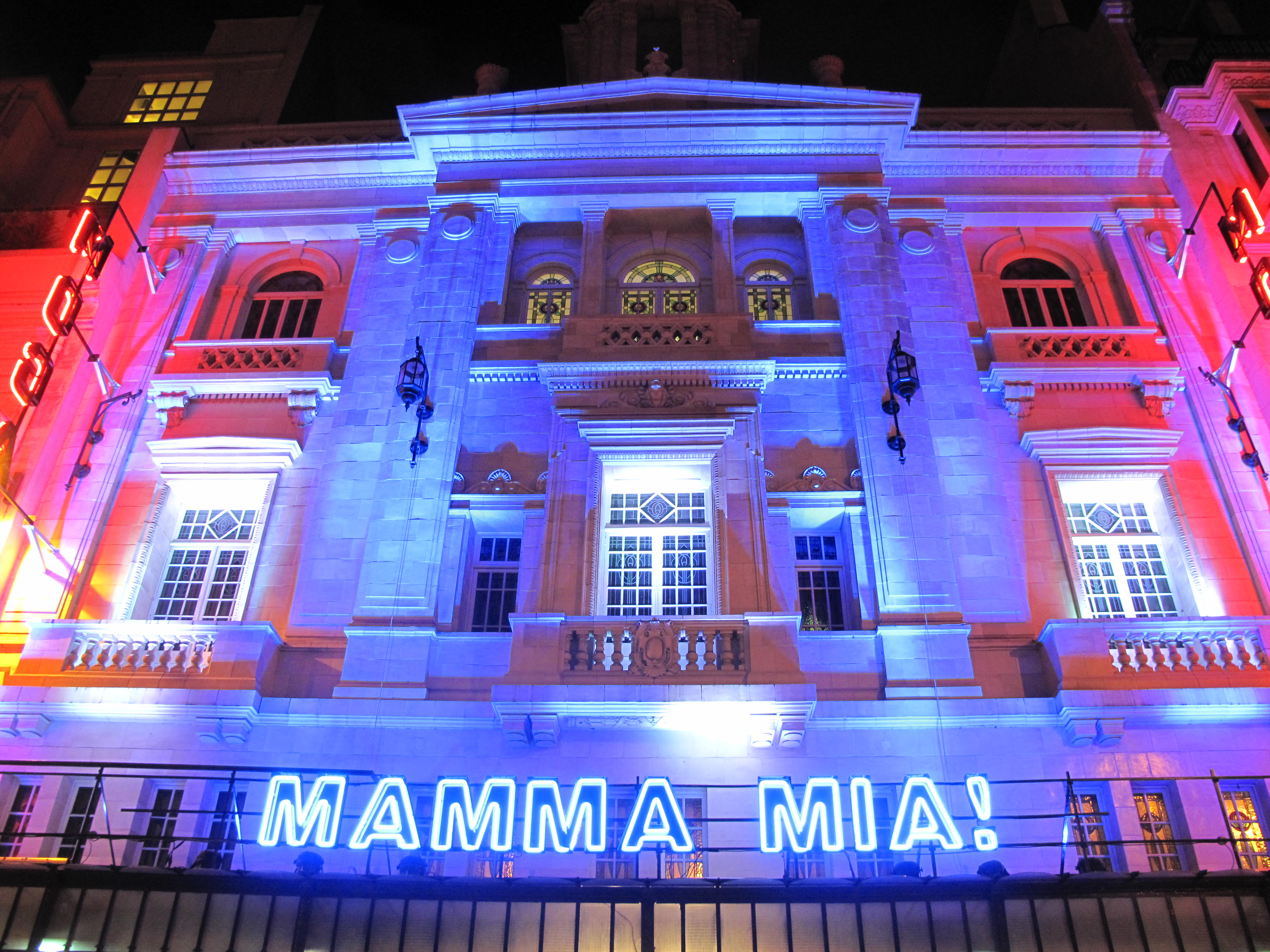
Mamma Mia! in Paris

Since its premiere in Dublin on 9 September 2004 (with Helen Hobson as Donna) the international tour been seen by 5 million people. In addition there have been several touring productions worldwide, including Asia, Australia, China, Denmark, France, Germany, Japan, Netherlands, South Africa, South Korea, Spain, and United Kingdom.

The Dutch actress Lone van Roosendaal has played Donna in three different countries: Netherlands, Belgium and Germany.

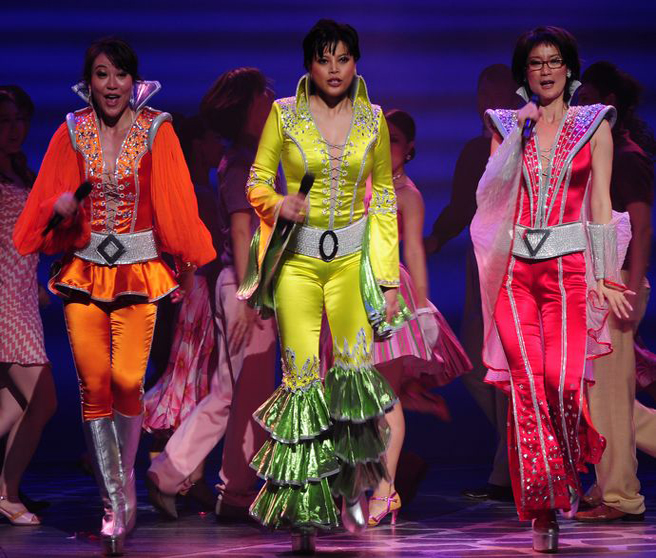
Mamma Mia! Chinese production

In the Original Danish Tivoli Copenhagen Cast it was actually Kristine Yde Eriksen as Sophie and Nadia Barbara Abrahamsen as Ali. But when the production moved to Aarhus Stine, Louise Henriksen took over for Kristine Yde Eriksen as Sophie and Nadin Reiness took over for Nadia Barbara Abrahamsen as Ali. Stine Louise Henriksen was actually Kristine's understudy in Tivoli, Copenhagen, and so was Nadin Reiness for Nadia.

The South African tour, conducted at the Artscape Theatre in Cape Town on 11 August 2010, and three months later at The Teatro, Montecasino in Johannesburg, featured an all-local cast.

The first Chinese production opened on 11 July 2011, at the Shanghai Grand Theatre and closed on 18 January 2012, at Shanghai Cultural Square after a small tour, marking the first time that a blockbuster contemporary Western musical was presented in Mandarin in Shanghai (there was a previous Mandarin production of Beauty and the Beast in Beijing in 1999). It was seen by 250,000 people across six venues, with a total of 190 performances. Two Chinese actresses, Tian Shui, and Shadow Zhang both played the role of Donna in turn. In the following years, the production toured around China from time to time, performing 100~150 shows per year, until 2017. A revival of this production is now touring in China again, with the role of Donna played by Adia Chan Chung Ling, a Hong Kong actor and pop singer famous in the 1980s and 1990s.

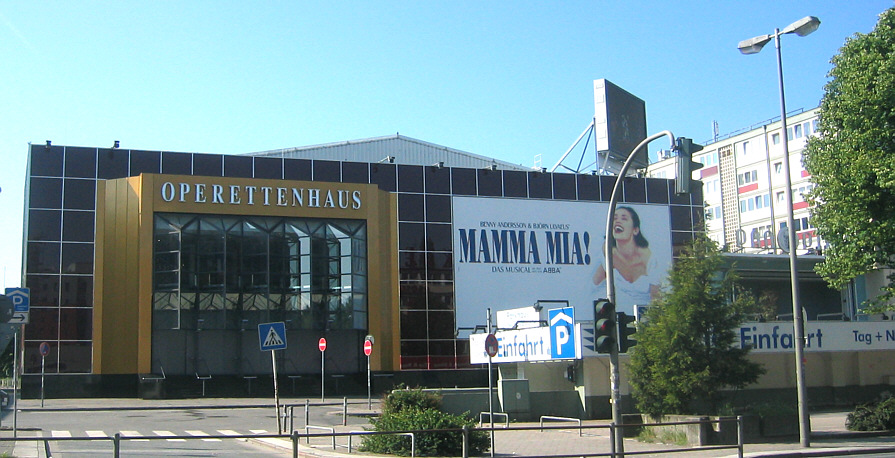
Mamma Mia! at the Operettenhaus in Hamburg, Germany

On 24 January 2012, Mamma Mia! opened in Manila at the Main Theater of the Cultural Center of the Philippines as part of the international tour. The show was originally set to stay only for a week but with the positive response, the organisers decided that it would play until 19 February 2012. The show featured Sara Poyzer as Donna Sheridan and Charlotte Wakefield as Sophie. The cast also included Kate Graham (Tanya), Jenny Dale (Rosie) and David Roberts (Sky).

A New Zealand tour production of Mamma Mia! opened at the Auckland Civic Theatre on 4 March 2014, featuring an all-new set design by John Harding. International theatre star Deliah Hannah played Donna, and popular New Zealand entertainment icon Jackie Clark plays Rosie. The NZ tour visited 11 cities in 2014–2016.

The musical was originally performed on sailings of Royal Caribbean's Quantum of the Seas but was later moved to Allure of the Seas. Unlike other cruise ship performances of musicals, the show is performed in its entirety.

In Prague, the capital of the Czech Republic, the musical had its premiere on 12 December 2014. Czech is the seventeenth language in which the musical was performed. At the date of the premiere, a record 70,000 tickets were sold.

On 21 February 2015, the musical premiered in Warsaw, Poland, at Roma Musical Theatre.

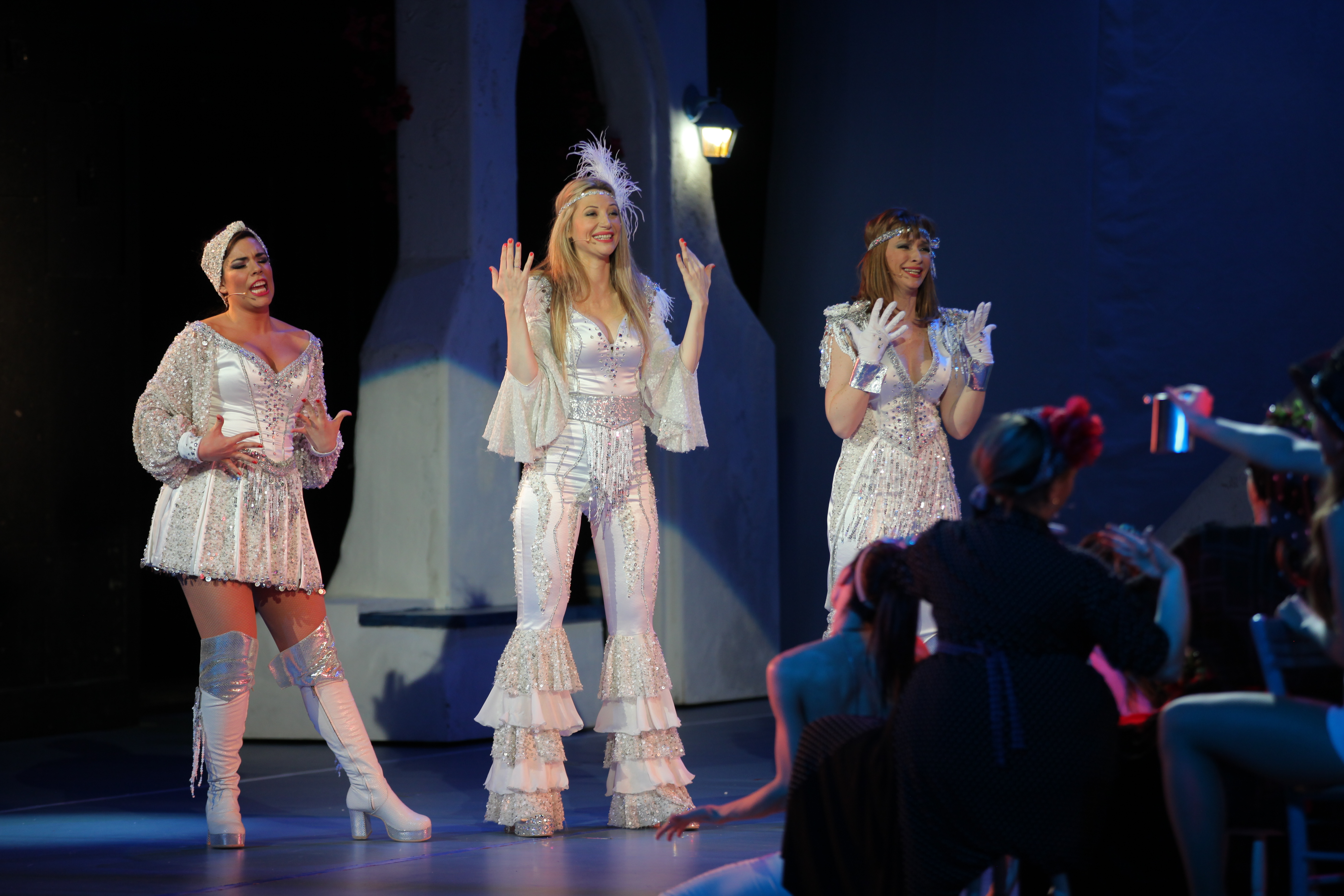
Mamma Mia! premiere in Serbia

The Belgrade, Serbia – Terazije Theatre (Pozorište na Terazijama) premiere was on 27 March 2015.

On 15 June 2015, in Ljubljana, the capital of Slovenia, the premiere of Slovene production took place in Križanke Outdoor Theatre as a part of Ljubljana Summer Festival (Poletni festival Ljubljana).

On 18 March 2016, Mamma Mia! opened for the first time in Panama City, Panama, at the Anayansi Theatre in the Atlapa Convention Centre, directed by Aaron Zebede.

On 27 May 2016, the first regional production opened at the Barter Theatre in Abingdon, Virginia.

On 31 August 2016, it was announced that the musical would once again tour Australia as a new, non-replica production to be directed by Gary Young. The premier was held in Canberra in November 2017 before continuing on a one-year national tour to Brisbane, Sydney, Perth, Melbourne and finally Adelaide. The cast included Sarah Morrison as Sophie, Natalie O'Donnell as Donna, Jayde Westaby as Tanya, Alicia Gardiner as Rose, Ian Stenlake as Sam, Phillip Lowe as Harry, Josef Ber as Bill and Stephen Mahy as Sky. The production was nominated for the following Helpmann Awards: Best Musical, Best Choreography (Tom Hodgson), Best Actress (Natalie O'Donnell) and Best Actor (Ian Stenlake).

On 26 November 2016, the musical opened at the theatre Vanemuine in Tartu, Estonia. The original Estonian cast included Birgit Sarrap as Sophie, Ele Millistfer and Merle Jalakas as Donna, Kaire Vilgats as Rosie and Kaarel Targo as Sky among others. As of April 2019, the show kept playing open end for high public demand.

From 28 to 30 July 2017, Mamma Mia! was performed at the Hollywood Bowl. Directed and choreographed by Kathleen Marshall, the show starred Jennifer Nettles as Donna, Dove Cameron as Sophie, Corbin Bleu as Sky, Jaime Camil as Sam, Tisha Campbell-Martin as Tanya, and Lea Delaria as Rosie.

Nová scéna Theatre in Bratislava, Slovakia, opened on 11 November 2017, for the first time in Slovak. In Slovakia were formerly performed Czech and original version.

A Finnish-language production premiered at the Messukeskus Helsinki in Helsinki, Finland, on 4 May 2018.

The Romanian production opened in Bucharest on May 24, 2018, produced by private companies at Sala Palatului. The director was Razvan Ioan Dinca, conductor Daniel Jinga, choreographer Violeta Dinca and Romanian-language translator of the lyrics and spoken text was Ernest Fazekas. The show is still running and won the "Show of the Year" Award.

A Bulgarian production opened on 18 July 2018, at the National opera and ballet in Sofia. There were other shows on 19, 20, 21 and 22 July 2018.

A revival of the Dutch production premiered at the Beatrix Theater Utrecht in Utrecht, Netherlands on 6 September 2018.

A production of the musical by East West Players (EWP) in Los Angeles from May to June 2019 featured a cast with all artists of colour, a majority of them Asian-Pacific Islander. The production made several allusions to Filipino culture (as this rendition of Donna and Sophie are a Filipina family living abroad), including Tagalog phrases, the tinikling folk dance, and traditional Filipino fashion The production was lauded for its inclusive casting decisions as well as its authentic portrayal of Filipino culture.

In 2019 a UK and international tour would run into 2020 starting at the Edinburgh Playhouse in September 2019 before heading to La Seine Musicale in October, The Bradford Alhambra Theatre in November, Bord Gais Energy Theatre in Dublin over the Christmas and new year period before continuing on 22 January 2020 at the Theatre Royal Newcastle before continuing to the Southampton Mayflower Theatre, Hull New Theatre, Liverpool Empire Theatre, Birmingham Hippodrome, Bristol Hippodrome and finishing in August at the Theatre Royal Plymouth. More dates were to be added.

Also in 2019, a French-speaking adaptation produced by Just for Laughs was made in Quebec, having a run in Montreal in June, July, and December at the Théâtre Saint-Denis, immediately followed by Quebec City in August at the Salle Albert-Rousseau. The production sold over 75,000 tickets over its limited run.

A non-replica Mexican revival opened in Mexico City on 10 March 2023 at the Teatro de los Insurgentes. Later that year, a new Argentine production, starring popular actress Florencia Peña as Donna, premiered on 18 December at the Teatro Luxor in Villa Carlos Paz. After the end of the summer season, it transferred to Buenos Aires, where it opened on 10 May 2024 at the Teatro Coliseo.

Since 2019, the Merybi theatre company from Gemona del Friuli (Udine, Italy) has been representing "Mamma Mia – Ce Spetacul", an adaptation of the musical with Friulian settings and many dialogues and jokes in Friulian; as of May 2023, the musical had been performed seven times in various theatres in the region.

== Synopsis ==
Before the curtain rises, the orchestra starts playing the overture, which is a montage of instrumental versions of some of ABBA's hit songs.

=== Act I ===
On the fictional Greek island of Kalokairi, 20-year-old Sophie is preparing to marry her fiancé, Sky. She wants her father to walk her down the aisle but does not know his identity ("Prologue"). She discovers her mother Donna's diary and finds old entries that describe dates with three possible fathers: an American architect named Sam Carmichael, an Australian writer and adventurer named Bill Austin, and a British banker named Harry Bright. She sends each an invitation to her wedding without telling Donna. All three men accept ("Honey, Honey").

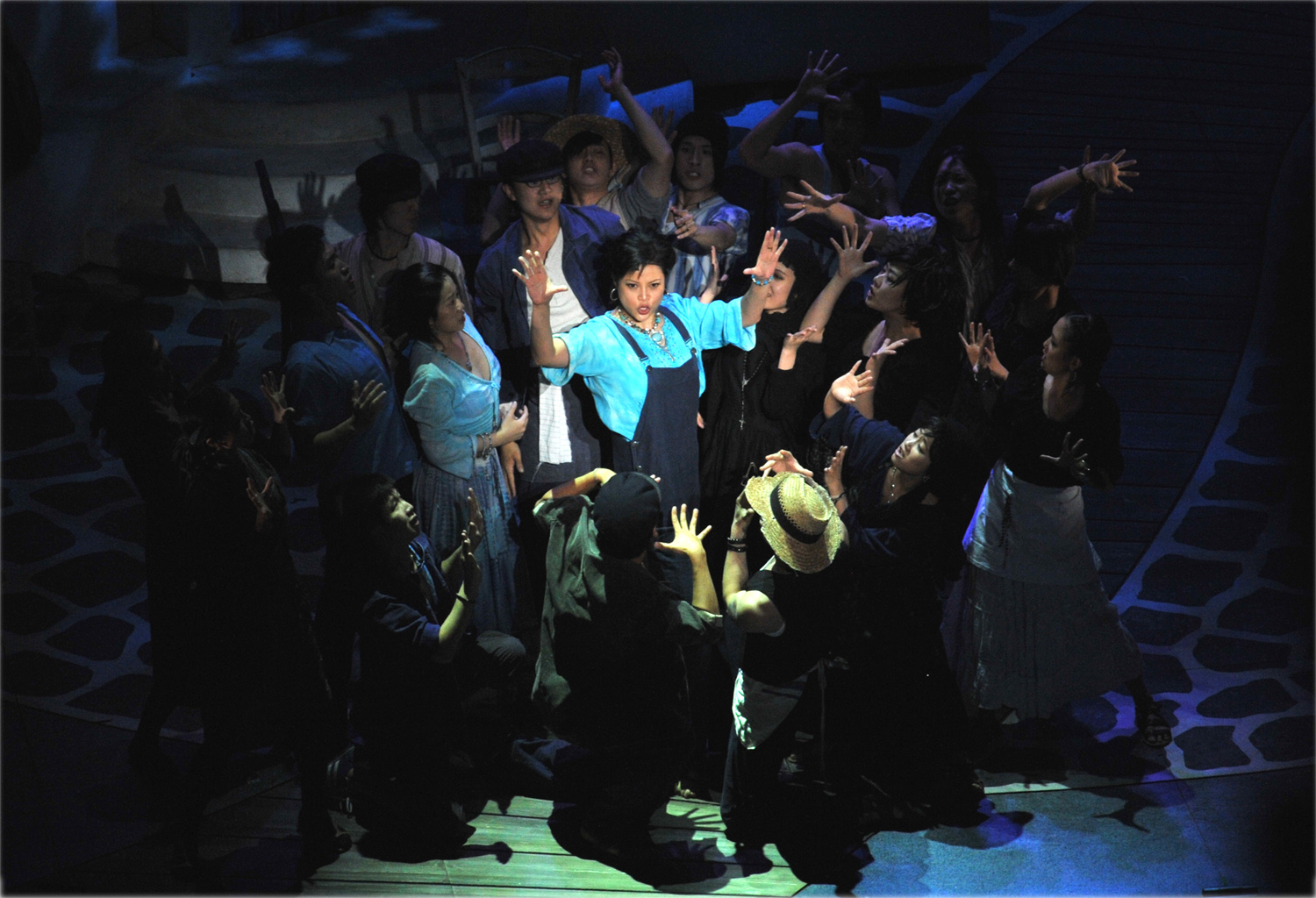
Mamma Mia Chinese production

Donna reunites with her long-time best friends, Tanya, a rich woman who has been married and divorced thrice, and Rosie, an unmarried and carefree woman, at her taverna. The trio used to comprise a girl group called "Donna and the Dynamos". Donna laments about the struggles of running the taverna singlehandedly ("Money, Money, Money").

Later that day, Sam, Bill, and Harry arrive at the island. They meet Sophie who convinces them not to tell Donna that she had invited them ("Thank You for the Music"). Donna is astonished to see her ex-lovers and runs off in tears ("Mamma Mia"). Tanya and Rosie attempt to comfort Donna ("Chiquitita"), and convince her that she can still be the girl she once was ("Dancing Queen").

Sophie tells Sky about her confusion regarding her father's real identity, but still does not reveal that she had invited them. Sky assures her he will be the only man she ever needs, right before his buddies take him to his bachelor party ("Lay All Your Love on Me"). At Sophie's bachelorette party, Donna and the Dynamos don their old costumes and perform a song ("Super Trouper"). Sam, Bill, and Harry accidentally walk in on the party, and the guests persuade them to stay ("Gimme! Gimme! Gimme! (A Man After Midnight)").

Sophie is unable to find any concrete answers from talking to either Sam or Harry, however she learns from Bill that he has an aunt Sophia who once lived with Donna and funded the taverna's construction. This leads both to believe Bill is Sophie's father and he reluctantly agrees to walk her down the aisle ("The Name of the Game"). The bachelor and bachelorette parties converge, where both Sam and Harry respectively tell Sophie they believe they're her father and promise to walk her down the aisle the next day. Hopelessly confused, Sophie leaves the party, unsure whom to believe ("Voulez-Vous").

=== Act II ===
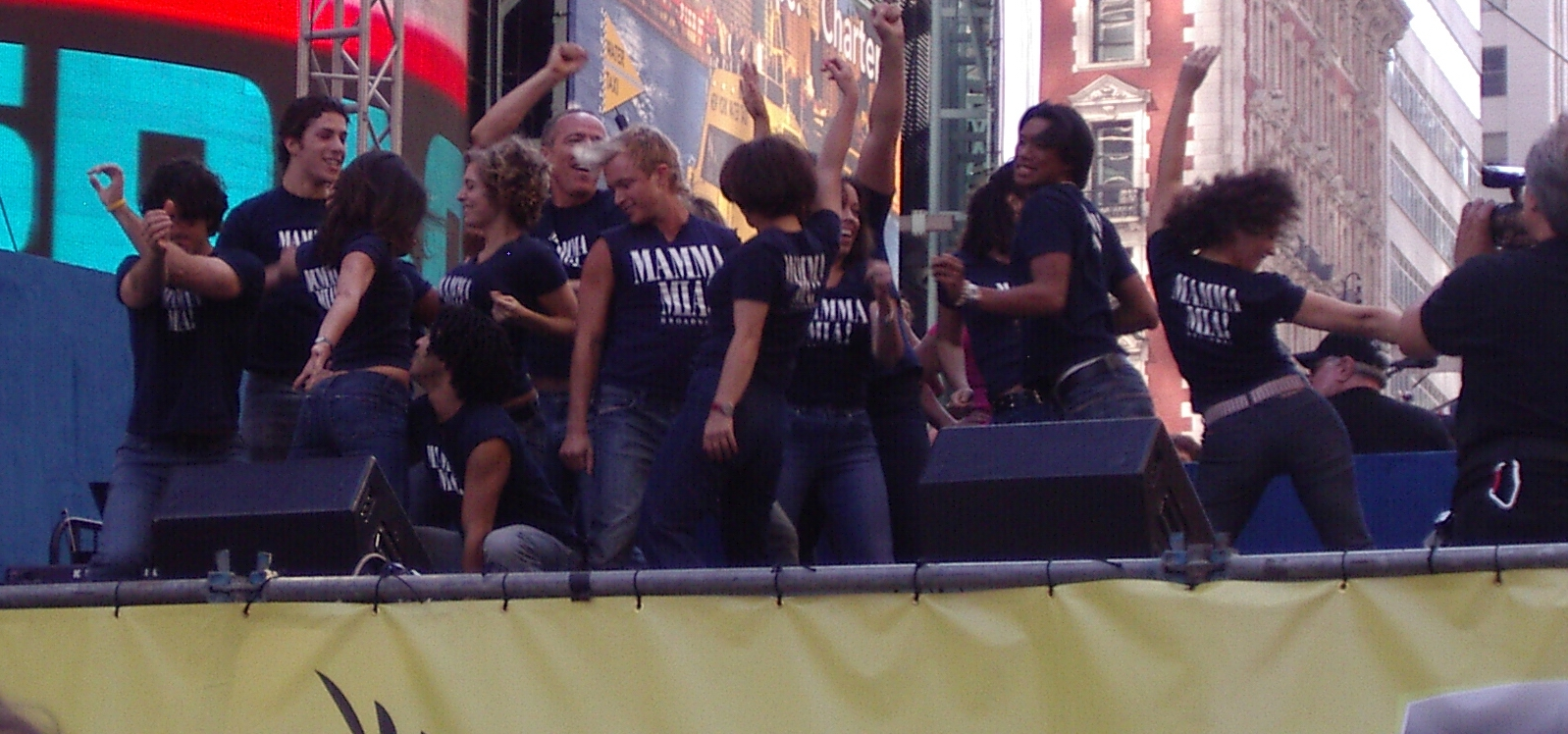
Mamma Mia! at Broadway On Broadway

(Entr'acte) Sophie has a nightmare, involving her three possible fathers all fighting for the right to walk her down the aisle and wakes up distressed ("Under Attack"). Donna is confused as to why Sophie is so upset on her wedding day, while Sophie emotionally blames Donna for raising her without a father. Donna is left to reminisce on her past relationships ("One of Us"). She gets into an argument with Sam; despite their conflict, Donna and Sam still love one another and wish their relationship had worked out differently ("SOS").

At the beach, a worker at Donna's taverna named Pepper makes advances to Tanya, but she rebuffs him ("Does Your Mother Know"). Sky figures out Sophie's plan and feels betrayed that she kept it a secret from him. Sam tries to give Sophie some fatherly advice by describing his own failed marriage ("Knowing Me, Knowing You"), but Sophie is not consoled. Harry offers Donna to pay for the wedding, and they reminisce about their fling ("Our Last Summer").

Donna helps Sophie get dressed for the wedding, in disbelief that her daughter is going to be a bride ("Slipping Through My Fingers"). They reconcile and Sophie asks Donna to walk her down the aisle, since she's the most active parental figure in her life. Sam tries speaking to Donna again, and a bitter confrontation ensues as Donna tells Sam that he broke her heart ("The Winner Takes It All"). Rosie is making final wedding preparations when Bill expresses disappointment that Donna has been selected to walk Sophie down the aisle. Bill reaffirms his commitment to single life, but Rosie confesses she has grown attracted to him, and urges him to reconsider ("Take a Chance on Me"). They become intimate just before getting interrupted by the arrival of guests, leaving Rosie quite stunned.

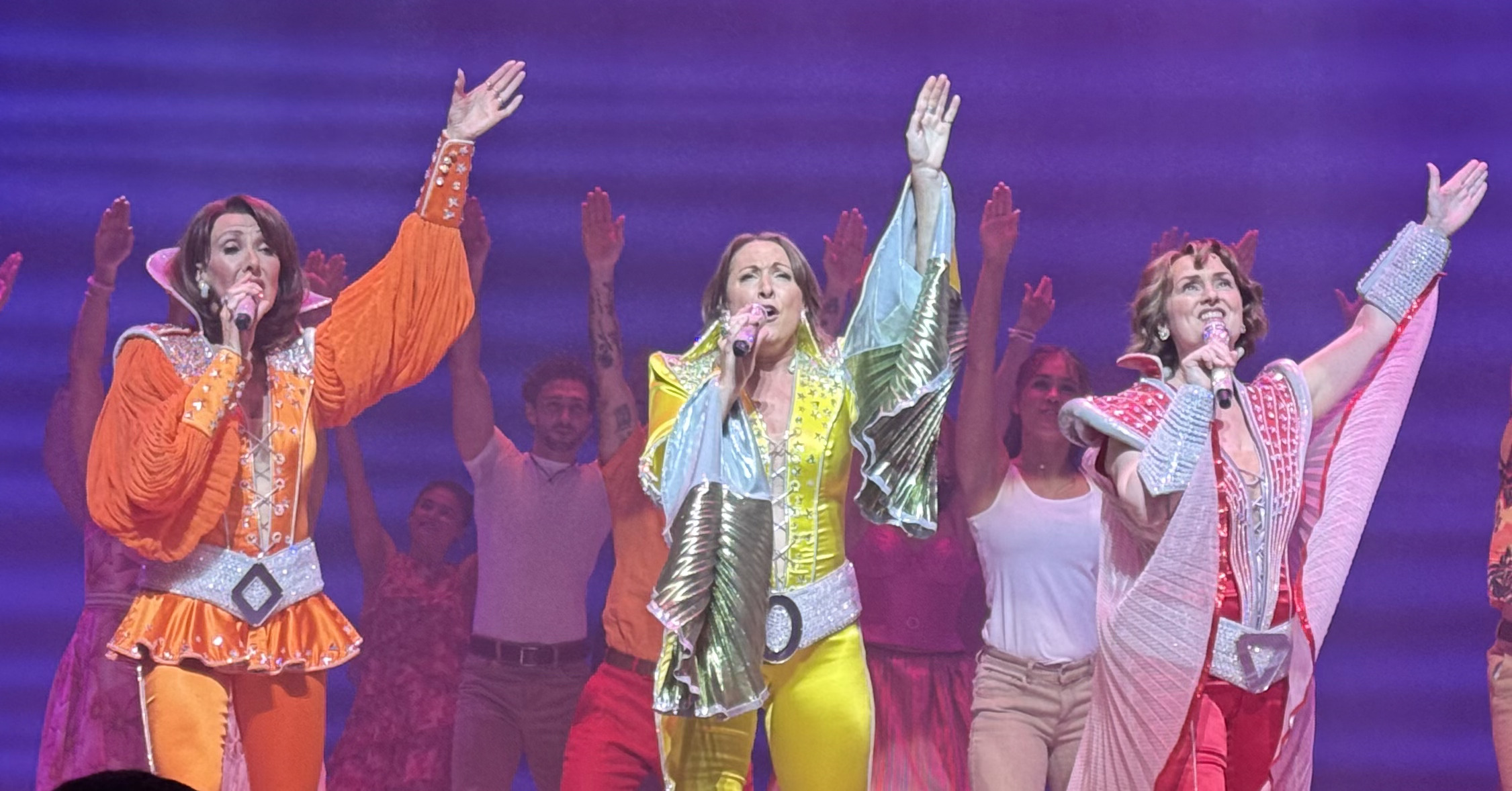
West End cast, from left to right: actresses Kate Graham (Tanya), Natalie Langston (alternate Donna), and Nicola-Dawn Brook (Rosie), in 2025

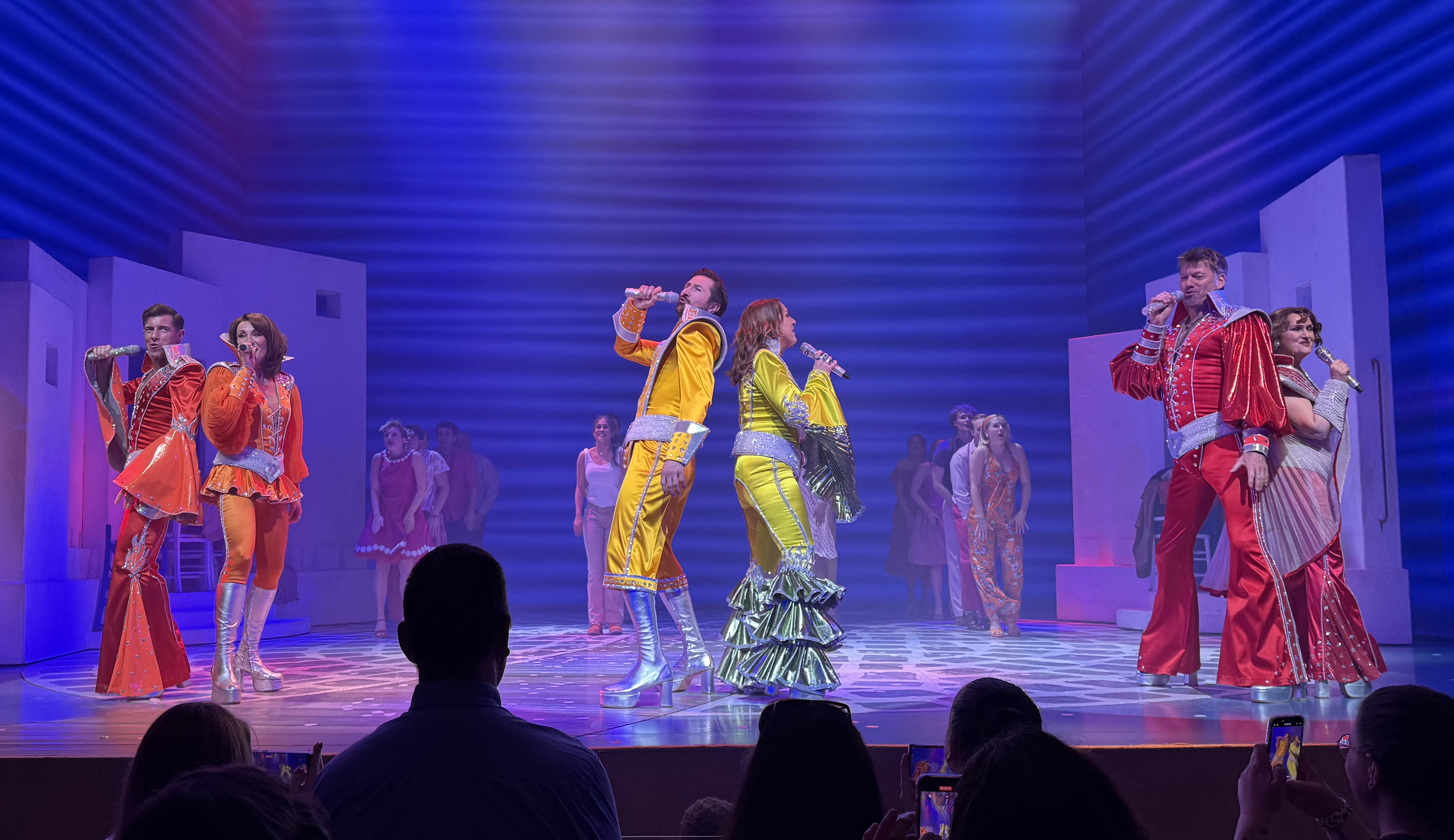
West End cast, from left to right: actors Christopher Dickins (Harry), Kate Graham (Tanya), Tom Parsons (Sam, understudy), Natalie Langston (Donna, alternate), Stephen Beckett (Bill), and Nicola-Dawn Brook (Rosie), in 2025

The wedding begins, with Donna walking Sophie down the aisle. Donna interrupts the ceremony and acknowledges to everyone that Sophie's father is present. Sophie finally tells her mother that she had secretly invited the three men, and Donna reveals she is also unsure which one is her father. Everyone involved agrees that the identity of Sophie's biological father does not matter, and all three are happy to be "one-third of a father" and a part of her life at last. During this discussion, Harry reveals he's in a committed gay relationship. Just as the wedding is about to resume, Sophie calls a halt to the proceedings and Sky agrees they are not ready to get married yet. Sam seizes his chance and proposes to Donna to prevent the wedding preparations from going to waste. He explains that he always loved her, and years ago had ended his own engagement and returned to the island only to find Donna had gone off with another man (Bill). Donna accepts and the two marry spontaneously ("I Do, I Do, I Do, I Do, I Do"). At the end of the night, Sophie and Sky depart Kalokairi to tour the world together ("I Have a Dream").

=== Finale and encore ===
After their final bows to the audience, the ensemble performs a reprise of "Mamma Mia". A reprise of "Dancing Queen" follows, during which Donna, Tanya and Rosie are revealed wearing brightly colored ABBA inspired costumes. The cast ends the finale with "Waterloo", during which Sam, Bill, and Harry join the rest of the cast onstage in brightly colored costumes that match the leading ladies. The Dynamos and the dads often invite the audience to clap, dance, and sing along during the finale.

== Musical numbers ==
Act I

- "Overture/Prologue" – Sophie
- "Honey, Honey" – Sophie, Ali & Lisa
- "Money, Money, Money" – Donna, Tanya, Rosie, Pepper & Company
- "Thank You for the Music" – Sophie, Sam, Harry & Bill
- "Mamma Mia" – Donna & Company
- "Chiquitita" – Donna, Tanya & Rosie
- "Dancing Queen" – Donna, Tanya & Rosie
- "Lay All Your Love on Me" – Sky, Sophie & Male Ensemble
- "Super Trouper" – Donna, Tanya, Rosie & Female Ensemble
- "Gimme! Gimme! Gimme! (A Man After Midnight)" – Female Ensemble
- "The Name of the Game" – Sophie & Bill
- "Voulez-Vous" – Company

Act II

- "Entr'acte" – Orchestra
- "Under Attack" – Sophie & Company
- "One of Us" – Donna
- "SOS" – Donna & Sam
- "Does Your Mother Know" – Tanya, Pepper & Company
- "Knowing Me, Knowing You" – Sam
- "Our Last Summer" – Harry & Donna
- "Slipping Through My Fingers" – Donna & Sophie
- "The Winner Takes It All" – Donna
- "Take a Chance on Me" – Rosie & Bill
- "I Do, I Do, I Do, I Do, I Do" – Sam, Donna & Company
- "I Have a Dream" – Sophie

Encore

- "Mamma Mia" – Company
- "Dancing Queen" – Donna, Tanya, Rosie & Company
- "Waterloo" – Company

=== Notes on the music ===
During the preview period in London, the musical had the song "Summer Night City" just after the prologue. The "Summer Night City" scene was a wedding rehearsal and during the song, Ali, Lisa, Tanya, and Rosie arrived on the island. The song was removed, although a small instrumental part of it remains as underscoring to connect the end of "The Winner Takes It All" and "Take a Chance on Me". Several lines of "Summer Night City" are also heard in the "Entr'acte".

Donna hums a few lines of "Fernando" when she repairs the doors of the taverna just before she sees her three former lovers.

The song that Sky briefly sings before starting "Lay All Your Love on Me" varies from one production to another, including "King Kong Song", "Summer Night City", "Dum Dum Diddle", and "She's My Kind of Girl", a Björn & Benny song.

The wedding march that is played as Sophie walks down the aisle is a slower arrangement of "Dancing Queen".

The creators also intended to include "Just Like That", an unreleased ABBA song recorded in 1982. The song was apparently dropped just before the first public previews in March 1999, though it was listed in the program available during the preview period.

The last three songs, performed as an encore/finale by the whole cast are: "Mamma Mia", "Dancing Queen" and "Waterloo". The version of "Mamma Mia" used in the encore/finale is sung by the Company. The finale song "Mamma Mia" has been extended in theatres where Donna and the Dynamos had to go downstairs for taking the stage lift in Dancing Queen. Then, during the intro of "Dancing Queen", Donna, Tanya and Rosie join the Company (as the girl-power band "Donna and the Dynamos", wearing ABBA's 1970s-style colourful and flashy costumes). Sam, Bill and Harry join them during Waterloo, wearing male versions of the girls' ABBA's costumes. The Encore is included on the 5th Anniversary Cast Recording (commemorating said anniversary for the Broadway production).

== Principal roles and casts ==
Character	Original West End cast	Original Broadway cast	Notable subsequent performers in noteworthy stage productions
Donna Sheridan	Siobhán McCarthy	Louise Pitre	Lisa Brescia, Carolee Carmello, Linzi Hateley, Annette Heick, Dee Hoty, Beth Leavel, Julia Murney, Mazz Murray, Jennifer Nettles, Florencia Peña, Louise Plowright, Nina, Michele Pawk, Dianne Pilkington, Sally Ann Triplett, Christine Sherrill, Willemijn Verkaik
Rosie	Jenny Galloway	Judy Kaye	Lea DeLaria, Ann Harada, Catherine Russell
Tanya	Louise Plowright	Karen Mason	Tisha Campbell, Mazz Murray
Sam Carmichael	Hilton McRae	David W. Keeley	Jaime Camil, Patrick Cassidy, Paolo Montalban, Richard Standing, Sean Allan Krill
Bill Austin	Nicolas Colicos	Ken Marks	Stephen Beckett, Mark Gillis, Steven Weber
Harry Bright	Paul Clarkson	Dean Nolen	Hamish Linklater
Sophie Sheridan	Lisa Stokke	Tina Maddigan	Christy Altomare, Dove Cameron, Erika Henningsen, Carrie Manolakos, Suzie Mathers, Georgina Castle
Sky	Andrew Langtree	Joe Machota	Corbin Bleu, Raza Jaffrey, Michael Xavier
Pepper	Neal Wright	Mark Price	Payson Lewis
Eddie	Nigel Harman	Michael B. Washington	Rodd Cyrus Farhadl
Ali	Eliza Lumley	Sara Inbar	Charlotte Mary Wen
Lisa	Melissa Gibson	Tonya Doran	Tiana Okoye

== Film series adaptation ==
Mamma Mia! was adapted as a film, produced by Judy Craymer and Gary Goetzman, written by Catherine Johnson directed by Phyllida Lloyd and with Tom Hanks, Rita Wilson, Björn Ulvaeus, and Benny Andersson as executive producers. Meryl Streep stars as Donna Sheridan with Amanda Seyfried as Sophie and Pierce Brosnan as Sam Carmichael. The movie also features Christine Baranski, Dominic Cooper, Colin Firth, Stellan Skarsgård and Julie Walters. It premiered 18 July 2008, in the US. Most of the songs remained intact with the exceptions of "Under Attack", "One of Us", "Knowing Me, Knowing You", and "Thank You for the Music". "Knowing Me, Knowing You" was used as the wedding music and "Thank You for the Music" is sung during the second half of the end credits. The first half is occupied with a "Dancing Queen" reprise and "Waterloo", with a "Mamma Mia" reprise and "I Have a Dream" sung before the credits (though the latter is sung as Sophie mails the invitations at the start of the film). "When All Is Said and Done", a song not used in the musical, was added for the film sung by Sam, Donna, and the company. "Our Last Summer" was used earlier in the movie, with Sophie, Bill, Sam, and Harry singing it. "The Name of the Game", while filmed, was subsequently edited out of the film for the final cut. The song is included in full on the motion picture soundtrack – an abbreviated version of the song and scene appear on the DVD/Blu-ray as a supplement. In addition, "Thank You for the Music" is used as a hidden track, and is performed by Amanda Seyfried.

A sequel to the film titled Mamma Mia! Here We Go Again was released in 2018. It tells the story of how Donna met each of the three men who are potentially Sophie's father. "One of Us" and "Knowing Me, Knowing You" are both included in this film. A third film was in development as of 2023.

== Awards and nominations ==
=== Original West End production ===
Year	Award Ceremony	Category	Nominee	Result
2000	Laurence Olivier Award	Best New Musical		Nominated
2000	Laurence Olivier Award	Best Actress in a Musical	Siobhan McCarthy	Nominated
2000	Laurence Olivier Award	Best Performance in a Supporting Role in a Musical	Jenny Galloway	Won
2000	Laurence Olivier Award	Best Performance in a Supporting Role in a Musical	Louise Plowright	Nominated
2002	Grammy Award	Best Musical Theater Album		Nominated

=== Original Broadway production ===
Year	Award Ceremony	Category	Nominee	Result
2002	Tony Award	Best Musical		Nominated
2002	Tony Award	Best Book of a Musical	Catherine Johnson	Nominated
2002	Tony Award	Best Actress in a Musical	Louise Pitre	Nominated
2002	Tony Award	Best Featured Actress in a Musical	Judy Kaye	Nominated
2002	Tony Award	Best Orchestrations	Benny Andersson, Björn Ulvaeus and Martin Koch	Nominated
2002	Drama Desk Award	Outstanding Actress in a Musical	Louise Pitre	Nominated
2002	Drama Desk Award	Outstanding Featured Actress in a Musical	Judy Kaye	Nominated
2002	Drama Desk Award	Outstanding Featured Actress in a Musical	Karen Mason	Nominated

=== Original North American tour ===
Year	Award Ceremony	Category	Nominee	Result
2003	Helen Hayes Award	Outstanding Non-Resident Production		Nominated
2003	Touring Broadway Award	Best Musical Score	Benny Andersson and Björn Ulvaeus	Won

== Response ==
=== Box office and business ===
On 15 May 2005, Mamma Mia! exceeded the original Broadway runs of The Sound of Music, The King and I, and Damn Yankees with 1,500 performances. On 6 March 2014, it surpassed Rent to become the 8th longest-running Broadway musical and 9th longest-running show of all time with 5,124 performances, then surpassed Beauty and the Beast's 5,462 performances that same year, on 14 December, to become Broadway's 7th longest-running musical and 8th longest-running show. The Broadway run ended, with its 5,758th performance on 12 September 2015. Two years later (16 August 2017) Wicked passed Mamma Mia! and moved it down one spot, in the list of longest-running Broadway shows.

When Mamma Mia! opened in Russia, it received a positive response. As of January 2008, Mamma Mia! became the longest daily running show in the history of Russian theatre.

== See also ==
- Abbacadabra, another musical based on the songs of ABBA
