= Waterloo (album) =

1974 studio album by ABBA

Studio album by ABBA
- Released: 4 March 1974
- Recorded: 24 September 1973 – 20 February 1974
- Studios: Metronome, Stockholm, Sweden
- Genres: Europop; rock
- Length: 38:09
- Languages: English and Swedish
- Labels: Polar; Epic (UK); Atlantic (US original release)
- Producers: Benny Andersson; Björn Ulvaeus

ABBA chronology
| Ring Ring (1973) | Waterloo (1974) | ABBA (1975) |

Singles from Waterloo
- 1. "Waterloo (Swedish Version)" Released: 4 March 1974; 2. "Waterloo (English Version)" Released: 4 March 1974; 3. "Honey, Honey" Released: April 1974; 4. "Hasta Mañana" Released: April 1974; 5. "Waterloo (German Version)" Released: 5 April 1974; 6. "Waterloo (French Version)" Released: 10 May 1974; 7. "Ring Ring (1974 Remix Version)" Released: 21 June 1974

Waterloo is the second studio album by the Swedish pop group ABBA, and the first released internationally. It was originally released on 4 March 1974 in Sweden through Polar Music. The album's lead single won ABBA the 1974 Eurovision Song Contest and became a global hit, launching the group's career. The album topped the charts in Sweden and Norway while also reaching the top ten in Finland and Germany.

== Recording ==
Recording sessions for Waterloo began on 24 September 1973 with the track "Dance (While the Music Still Goes On)". This song was unusual in that it is the only ABBA track not to feature member Benny Andersson on keyboards, instead featuring American pianist John "Rabbit" Bundrick who was in Sweden at the time. Bundrick, however, was not credited on the album. Three weeks later the next two songs ("Suzy-Hang-Around" and "My Mama Said") went into the studio. A recording sheet from the day credits the artist as "ABBA", the first time the name was ever used in writing (the group had previously been called "Björn & Benny, Agnetha & Anni-Frid"), although their manager Stig Anderson had informally been calling them ABBA with the media for some time. The former of these songs marks the only time Benny Andersson sang lead on a track. Two more tracks were recorded on 17 October; "What About Livingstone" and "Honey, Honey" – the latter being the second single released from the album in most countries. "King Kong Song" was recorded on 14 November, a song which members Benny Andersson and Björn Ulvaeus today single out as one of their weakest tracks. This was also the date in which it was announced that ABBA were to appear at the Swedish selection for the 1974 Eurovision Song Contest.

From that point, recording sessions sped up and the rest of the tracks were recorded. Two songs were up for consideration for their Eurovision entry; "Waterloo" and "Hasta Mañana". The group preferred the former but felt the latter was a safer bet. Ultimately they chose "Waterloo" as it was more the direction they wished to take the group. "Waterloo" and "Watch Out" were recorded on the same day, with the latter becoming the B-side to the former.

== Release ==
Waterloo was released in March 1974. It was first released on CD in Sweden in 1988 alongside Ring Ring and the self titled album. It is the only CD version of the album to follow the original Scandinavian LP's running order. Polydor first released Waterloo, along with Ring Ring, throughout Europe in 1990, with the discs being pressed in West Germany. These discs follow the running order of the Waterloo LP that was released in The Netherlands, swapping "Watch Out" and "What About Livingstone" in the tracklist. In 1995, Polydor reissued their pressings of all of ABBA's albums in the United States. The album has been reissued in digitally remastered form several times: in 1997 as part of "The ABBA Remasters" series, then in 2001 with an updated cover artwork and some bonus tracks, again in 2005 as part of The Complete Studio Recordings box set, and most recently in 2014 as a 40th anniversary "Deluxe Edition" reissue. This version of the album entered the UK album charts.

On 5 April 2024, a new collection of vinyl products was released for the album's 50th anniversary celebration, featuring: a double-LP 45-rpm half-speed mastered gatefold version of the album; a seven-inch box set with colored discs (red, white and blue) of "Honey, Honey" / "King Kong Song", "Waterloo"/ "Watch Out" and "Waterloo (Swedish Version)" / "Honey, Honey (Swedish Version)", respectively; and individual 7-inch picture discs of these same three singles. A 10-inch limited edition "Waterloo" single was also released, featuring the four different language versions of the track. The half-speed high-quality audio was mastered by Miles Showell at Abbey Road Studios.

=== Deluxe edition ===
On 7 April 2014, Waterloo was reissued as a 2-disc deluxe edition package for its 40th anniversary. The first disc consisted of a CD version of the original album, expanded with eight bonus tracks, and featuring: all the language versions of "Waterloo" (including an alternate mix of the English version), the Swedish version of "Honey, Honey", and the 1974 US remix of "Ring, Ring".

The second disc, a DVD, contained the "International Sleeve Gallery" along with thirteen TV appearances, eight of which were performances of "Waterloo": two from the Eurovision Song Contest, with a preview performance on SVT; two from Melodifestivalen, three from Top of the Pops, and one German performance from NDR's Musik aus Studio B. The remaining TV content included performances of "Honey, Honey" on Disco (ZDF), Spotlight (ORF), and Ein Kessel Buntes (Fernsehen der DDR), as well as an interview with Frida and Stig Anderson, following the band's Eurovision victory.

The set also came with a 20-page illustrated booklet with an essay on the making of the album. It is the last release from the ABBA Deluxe Edition album series.

=== Album cover ===
The album's cover features the sub-title "Björn, Benny, Agnetha & Frida" although some editions replaced 'Agnetha' with 'Anna' – by which Agnetha Fältskog was known in some countries. The cover photo was taken at Gripsholm Castle, in Mariefred, Sweden, and features bass player Mike Watson dressed as Napoleon.

== Critical reception ==
Professional ratings
Review scores
| Source | Rating |
|---|---|
| AllMusic | 3/5 stars |
| The Encyclopedia of Popular Music | 2/5 stars |
| Ondarock | 5.5/10 |
| The Rolling Stone Album Guide | 3/5 stars |

"Waterloo" swept to victory at the Swedish heats and the group represented Sweden in Brighton, England, for the Eurovision Song Contest 1974. ABBA won the contest and "Waterloo" became not only a massive hit in Europe but all over the world (peaking at No. 6 in the US, for example). In Sweden, the album had already been released and topped the Swedish album charts for 12 weeks, becoming one of the biggest-selling Swedish albums ever to that point. In the UK the album made No. 28, the first time a foreign Eurovision act had charted an album, and it performed well in the rest of Europe.

After the Melodifestovalen victory, Swedish tabloid newspaper Aftonbladet's Christer Faleij reviewed the album on 1 March 1974, before the release of the album. Faleij gave the album a positive review in Swedish calling it an "incredibly professional production":

Without necessarily making a fuss, it can be briefly stated that the quartet is still taking a giant leap towards the international market. It's about streamlined, practical music with stylish vocals and driven arrangements. Quite in keeping with the style, it starts with "Waterloo" in Swedish and ends with the same song in English. In between, there are 10 tracks, of which at least a couple have as good a chance as "Waterloo" to really hit the spot. Personally, I believe "Honey Honey" will be another big seller. It would also have placed well in the Swedish selection. And "Watch Out" with its heavy accompaniment will also be a success. There are several themes running through the album: soft and heavy pop, a not-so-small nod to the Supremes in "What About Livingstone", a hit in "Hasta Mañana". Benny Andersson together with Björn Ulvaeus is responsible for most of the material. In three melodies, Stikkan Anderson has stepped in as a lyricist. All lyrics except the Swedish version of "Waterloo" are in English. The majority of the songs creep in and stay. They are simple, uncomplicated melody loops that are easy to understand. "Waterloo" has already passed the so-called gold mark, even though the album is not yet available in stores. This is through pre-orders. I think it will be very exciting for Swedish people in Brighton on April 6.

American magazine Cash Box reported:

[The] album is a positive blast of inspirational music. The disk has all the potential to break big here in the U.S. as it has in England and the group sounds like an enthusiastic musical powerhouse. Particularly enjoyable are "Sitting In The Palmtree." "Honey, Honey," "Ring Ring." "Suzy Hang Around,- and "Dance (While The Music Still Goes On)." If thegroup's sound begins to pick up the kind of response it has as a result of "Waterloo." look for another supergroup.

Reviews of the album were positive with Phonograph Record's Greg Shaw stating that it "might just turn out to be one of the classic début LPs of the '70s". Rolling Stone also gave the album a favourable review. In a 3-star retrospective review, Bruce Eder from AllMusic said that the album was "unusual in the group's output" due to the "variety of sounds" and because "the guys are still featured fairly prominently in some of the vocals". He wrote, in relation to "King Kong Song", that "when the women's voices jump in on the choruses, it's hard not to listen attentively; the quartet knew what a powerful weapon they had, but not quite how to use it".

== Track listing ==
The information is based on the Swedish version of the album and has been adapted from the official ABBA website. All tracks are written by Benny Andersson and Björn Ulvaeus, except where noted.

Side one
| No. | Title | Writer(s) | Length |
|---|---|---|---|
| 1. | "Waterloo" (Swedish version) | Andersson; Stig Anderson; Ulvaeus | 2:45 |
| 2. | "Sitting in the Palmtree" | | 3:39 |
| 3. | "King Kong Song" | | 3:14 |
| 4. | "Hasta Mañana" | Andersson; Anderson; Ulvaeus | 3:05 |
| 5. | "My Mama Said" | | 3:14 |
| 6. | "Dance (While the Music Still Goes On)" | | 3:05 |

Side two
| No. | Title | Writer(s) | Length |
|---|---|---|---|
| 1. | "Honey, Honey" | Andersson; Anderson; Ulvaeus | 2:55 |
| 2. | "Watch Out" | | 3:46 |
| 3. | "What About Livingstone" | | 2:54 |
| 4. | "Gonna Sing You My Love Song" | | 3:35 |
| 5. | "Suzy-Hang-Around" | | 3:11 |
| 6. | "Waterloo" (English version) | Andersson; Anderson; Ulvaeus | 2:46 |
| Total length: | | | 38:09 |

Notes

- The international edition of the album opens with the English version of "Waterloo" and closes with the English version of "Ring Ring".

=== Deluxe edition ===
Released for the album's 40th anniversary, this edition also features the Swedish version of "Waterloo" as a bonus track. All tracks are written by Benny Andersson, Björn Ulvaeus, and Stig Anderson, except where noted.

Bonus tracks
| No. | Title | Writer(s) | Length |
|---|---|---|---|
| 1. | "Ring Ring" (US remix 1974) | Andersson; Anderson; Ulvaeus; Neil Sedaka; Phil Cody | 3:06 |
| 2. | "Honey, Honey" (Swedish version) | | 2:59 |
| 3. | "Waterloo" (German version) | Andersson; Anderson; Ulvaeus; Gerd Müller-Schwanke | 2:44 |
| 4. | "Hasta mañana" (Spanish version) | Andersson; Anderson; Ulvaeus; Buddy McCluskey; Mary McCluskey | 3:09 |
| 5. | "Waterloo" (French version) | Andersson; Anderson; Ulvaeus; Alain Boublil | 2:42 |
| 6. | "Ring Ring" (1974 remix, single version) | Andersson; Anderson; Ulvaeus; Sedaka; Cody | 3:10 |
| 7. | "Waterloo" (alternate mix) | | 2:45 |

== Personnel ==
Adapted from original Swedish release's liner notes.

ABBA

- Agnetha Fältskog – lead vocals (4, 6), co-lead vocals (1, 3, 5, 7, 9, 12), backing vocals
- Anni-Frid Lyngstad – lead vocals (10), co-lead vocals (1, 3, 5, 7, 9, 12), backing vocals
- Björn Ulvaeus – acoustic guitar, lead vocals (2, 8), co-lead vocals (3, 6, 7, 11), backing vocals
- Benny Andersson – piano, Moog synthesizer, mellotron, lead vocals (11), co-lead vocals (3, 6, 7), backing vocals

Additional musicians

- Janne Schaffer – guitars
- Rutger Gunnarsson – bass guitar
- Ola Brunkert – drums
- Per Sahlberg – bass guitar (6)
- Christer Eklund – tenor saxophone (1, 12)
- Malando Gassama – congas (2)

Production

- Benny Andersson; Björn Ulvaeus – producers
- Michael B. Tretow – engineer
- Sven-Olof Walldoff – strings arrangement (7)
- Ola Lager – photography
- Ron Spaulding – album design

== Charts ==
=== Weekly charts ===
Original release
| Chart (1974) | Peak position |
|---|---|
| Australia Albums (Kent Music Report) | 18 |
| Dutch Albums (Album Top 100) | 74 |
| Finnish Albums (Suomen virallinen lista) | 2 |
| German Albums (Offizielle Top 100) | 6 |
| New Zealand Albums (RMNZ) | 38 |
| Norwegian Albums (VG-lista) | 1 |
| Swedish Albums (Sverigetopplistan) | 1 |
| UK Albums (Official Charts) | 28 |
| US Billboard 200 | 145 |
| US Cash Box Top 100 Albums | 156 |
| US Record World Albums | 153 |

40th Anniversary Edition
| Chart (2014) | Peak position |
|---|---|
| Belgian Albums (Ultratop Flanders) | 83 |
| Belgian Albums (Ultratop Wallonia) | 159 |
| Swedish Albums (Sverigetopplistan) | 49 |
| UK Albums (Official Charts) | 71 |

=== Year-end charts ===
| Chart (1974) | Position |
|---|---|
| German Albums (Offizielle Top 100) | 24 |

== Release history ==
| Region | Date | Label | Format | Catalog | Reference |
|---|---|---|---|---|---|
| Scandinavia | 4 March 1974 | Polar | LP · cassette · 8-track cartridge | POLS 252 | |
| United Kingdom | 17 May 1974 | Epic | LP · cassette | EPC 80179 | |
| Australia | May 1974 | RCA Victor | LP · cassette | VPL1-4003 | |

== Certifications and sales ==
| Region | Certification | Certified units/sales |
|---|---|---|
| Australia (ARIA) | 2× Platinum | 100,000^{^} |
| Denmark (IFPI Danmark) | Silver | 25,000 |
| Finland (Musiikkituottajat) | Gold | 25,035 |
| Germany (BVMI) | Platinum | 500,000^{^} |
| Sweden (GLF) | Diamond | 349,938 |
| United Kingdom (BPI) | Silver | 60,000^{^} |
| Yugoslavia | Silver | 18,000 |
Summaries
| Europe | — | 3,000,000 |
^{^} Shipments figures based on certification alone.
