= Waterloo (song) =

1974 song by ABBA

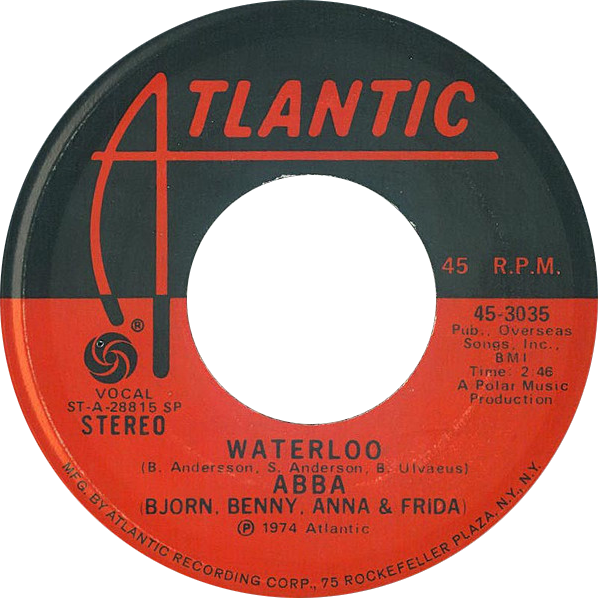
- US single of the English version

Single by ABBA

from the album Waterloo
- B-side: "Honey, Honey (Svensk Version)" (Swedish-language release); "Watch Out" (English-language release)
- Released: 4 March 1974
- Recorded: 1973
- Studio: Metronome, Stockholm, Sweden
- Genre: Europop; rock and roll; rock
- Length: 2:42
- Label: Polar; Epic; Polydor; Atlantic
- Composers: Benny Andersson; Björn Ulvaeus
- Lyricist: Stikkan Anderson
- Producers: Benny Andersson; Björn Ulvaeus

ABBA singles chronology
"Nina, Pretty Ballerina" (1973)	"Waterloo" (1974)	"Honey, Honey" (1974)

Audio sample
- Waterloo (English version): file; help

Music video
- "Waterloo" on YouTube

Eurovision Song Contest 1974 entry
- Country: Sweden
- Artists: Benny Andersson; Björn Ulvaeus; Agnetha Fältskog; Anni-Frid Lyngstad
- As: ABBA
- Language: English
- Composers: Benny Andersson; Björn Ulvaeus
- Lyricist: Stikkan Anderson
- Conductor: Sven-Olof Walldoff

Finals performance
- Final result: 1st
- Final points: 24

Entry chronology
- ◄ "You're Summer" (1973)
- "Jennie, Jennie" (1975) ►

Official performance video
- "Waterloo" on YouTube "Waterloo" (reprise) on YouTube

"Waterloo" is a song recorded by Swedish pop music group ABBA, with music composed by Benny Andersson and Björn Ulvaeus and lyrics written by Stikkan Anderson. It is the first single of the group's second album of the same name, and their first under the Atlantic label in the Canada and United States. This was also the first single to be credited to the group performing under the name ABBA. The Swedish version of the single was backed with the Swedish version of "Honey, Honey", while the English version featured "Watch Out" on the B-side.

In 1974, after winning the 14th edition of the Melodifestivalen, "Waterloo" represented Sweden in the 19th edition of the Eurovision Song Contest held in Brighton, England, winning the contest and beginning ABBA's path to worldwide fame. It topped the charts in several countries, and reached the top 10 in the United States.

In 2005, at Eurovision fiftieth anniversary competition Congratulations: 50 Years of the Eurovision Song Contest, "Waterloo" was chosen as the best song in the contest's history.

== History ==
=== Writing, recording and meaning ===
On 10 February 1973, ABBA as "Agnetha, Anni-Frid, Björn and Benny" competed with "Ring Ring" in the 13th edition of the Melodifestivalen, placing third. After this good position, Benny Andersson and Björn Ulvaeus composed the music, and Stikkan Anderson wrote the lyrics, of "Waterloo" specifically for the group to enter in the 14th edition of the Melodifestivalen.

Recording of the song commenced in 1973, with instrumental backing from Janne Schaffer (who came up with the main guitar and bass parts), Rutger Gunnarsson and Ola Brunkert. The song's production style was influenced by Phil Spector's "Wall of Sound": prior to recording "Ring Ring", engineer Michael B. Tretow had read Richard Williams's book Out of His Head: The Sound of Phil Spector, which inspired him to layer multiple instrumental overdubs on the band's recordings, becoming an integral part of ABBA's sound. Furthermore, ABBA had also originally cited the song "See My Baby Jive", by English glam rock band Wizzard, as a major influence (it was produced in the same style and has a similar structure); in the wake of their Eurovision victory, they were quoted as saying that it would not surprise them if artists such as Wizzard would consider entering the Eurovision in the future.

=== Melodifestivalen 1974 ===
In 1974, the group considered submitting "Hasta Mañana" to the 14th edition of the Melodifestivalen, but decided on "Waterloo" since it gave equal weight to both lead vocalists Agnetha Fältskog and Anni-Frid Lyngstad, while "Hasta Mañana" was sung only by Fältskog.

On 9 February 1974, ABBA competed with the Swedish-language version of "Waterloo" in the Melodifestivalen final. The song won the competition with 302 points, beating the 211 points of the runner-up. As that Melodifestivalen was organised by Sveriges Radio (SR) to select its song and performer for the 19th edition of the Eurovision Song Contest, the song became the Swedish entrant, and ABBA the performers, for Eurovision.

Subsequently, the group recorded the German and French versions of the song in March and April 1974, respectively: the French version was adapted by Alain Boublil, who would later go on to co-write the 1980 musical Les Misérables, and the German version was adapted by Gerd Müller-Schwanke. During ABBA's promotional visit to Spain, in May 1974, newspaper reports said that the group would be recording a Spanish version of the song while in the country. Because it was never released, it is not certain whether the recording for this version ever existed or if it remains unreleased.

=== Promo video ===
SR released a promo video for "Waterloo", directed by Lasse Hallström, that was recorded at SVT Studios in Stockholm at the same time as that for Ring Ring. The group appears performing the song with its four members dressed in the same outfits they wore in the Melodifestivalen and would wear at Eurovision. The video clip was incorporated into Abba's DVDs The Definitive Collection, ABBA Number Ones, ABBA: 16 Hits, ABBA Gold, and The Last Video.

=== Eurovision ===
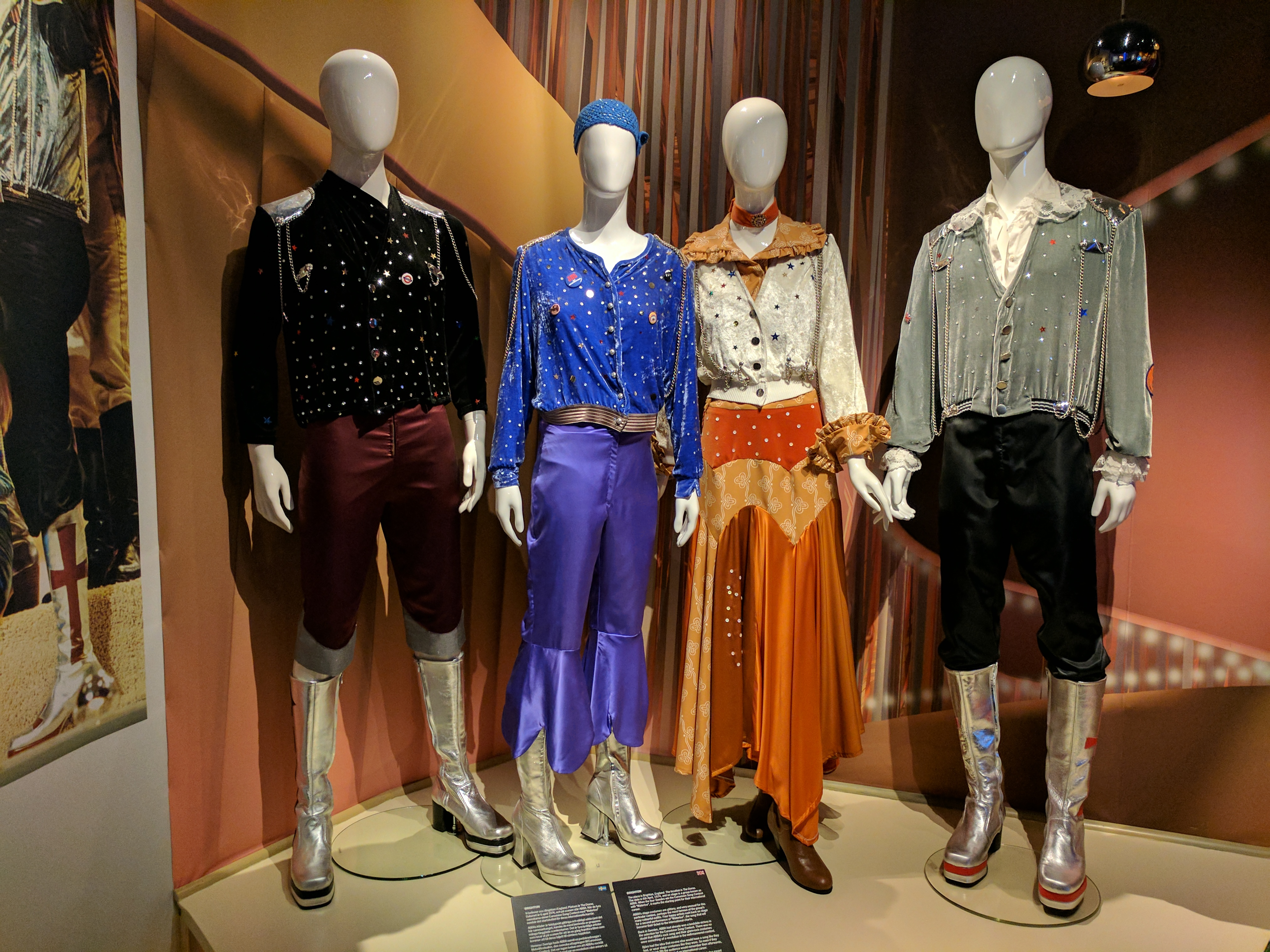
ABBA's original "Waterloo" outfits at ABBA The Museum

On 6 April 1974, the Eurovision Song Contest was held at The Dome in Brighton hosted by the BBC, and broadcast live throughout the continent. ABBA performed the English-language version of "Waterloo" eighth on the evening, following "Generacija '42" by Korni Grupa from Yugoslavia and preceding "Bye Bye I Love You" by Ireen Sheer from Luxembourg. Sven-Olof Walldoff, dressed as Napoleon, conducted the event's live orchestra in the performances of the Swedish entry.

At the end of voting, the song scored 24 points placing first and winning the contest, beating runner-up "Sì" by Gigliola Cinquetti from Italy by six points. British panelist Basil Herwald famously gave the song "nul points". Reflecting on the events 47 years later, Abba songwriter Björn Ulvaeus suggested the UK might have given his group the lowest possible score as they viewed them as the biggest possible threat to Olivia Newton-John, who was representing the UK and was considered the favourite to win.

The song differed from the standard "dramatic ballad" tradition at the contest by its flavour and rhythm, as well as by its performance. ABBA gave the audience something that had rarely been seen before in Eurovision: flashy costumes (including silver platform boots), a catchy uptempo song and simple choreography. It was the first winning entry in a language other than that of their home country; prior to 1973, all Eurovision singers had been required to sing in their country's native tongue, a restriction that was lifted briefly for the contests between 1973 and 1976 (thus allowing "Waterloo" to be sung in English), then reinstated before ultimately being removed again in 1999. Compared to later ABBA releases, the singers' Swedish accents are decidedly more pronounced in "Waterloo".

=== Aftermath ===
"Waterloo" was re-released in 2004 (with the same B-side), to celebrate the 30th anniversary of ABBA's Eurovision win, reaching No. 20 on the UK charts.

"Waterloo" was one of fourteen songs chosen by Eurovision fans and a European Broadcasting Union (EBU) reference group, from among the 992 songs that had ever participated in the contest, to participate in the fiftieth anniversary competition Congratulations: 50 Years of the Eurovision Song Contest held on 22 October 2005 in Copenhagen. It won the competition ranking as the best song in the contest's history. It received the same honour in a 14-country open vote in the run-up to the Eurovision Song Contest 2021, placing first above Sweden's winning songs in 2012 and 2015, "Euphoria" by Loreen and "Heroes" by Måns Zelmerlöw, respectively.

On 11 July 2023, at the celebrations for the 175th anniversary of London Waterloo station, where ABBA were photographed following their win at the 1974 Eurovision Song Contest, a choir performed Waterloo as part of a selection of songs.

== Track listing ==
Swedish version

1. "Waterloo" (Swedish version) – 2:45
2. "Honey Honey" (Swedish version) – 2:55

English version

1. "Waterloo" (English version) – 2:46
2. "Watch Out" – 3:46

Official versions

1. "Waterloo" (English version)
2. "Waterloo" (English alternate version)
3. "Waterloo" (French version) – recorded 18 April 1974 in Paris, France
4. "Waterloo" (French/Swedish version) – overdubs of French and Swedish versions
5. "Waterloo" (German version)
6. "Waterloo" (Swedish version)

== Critical reception ==
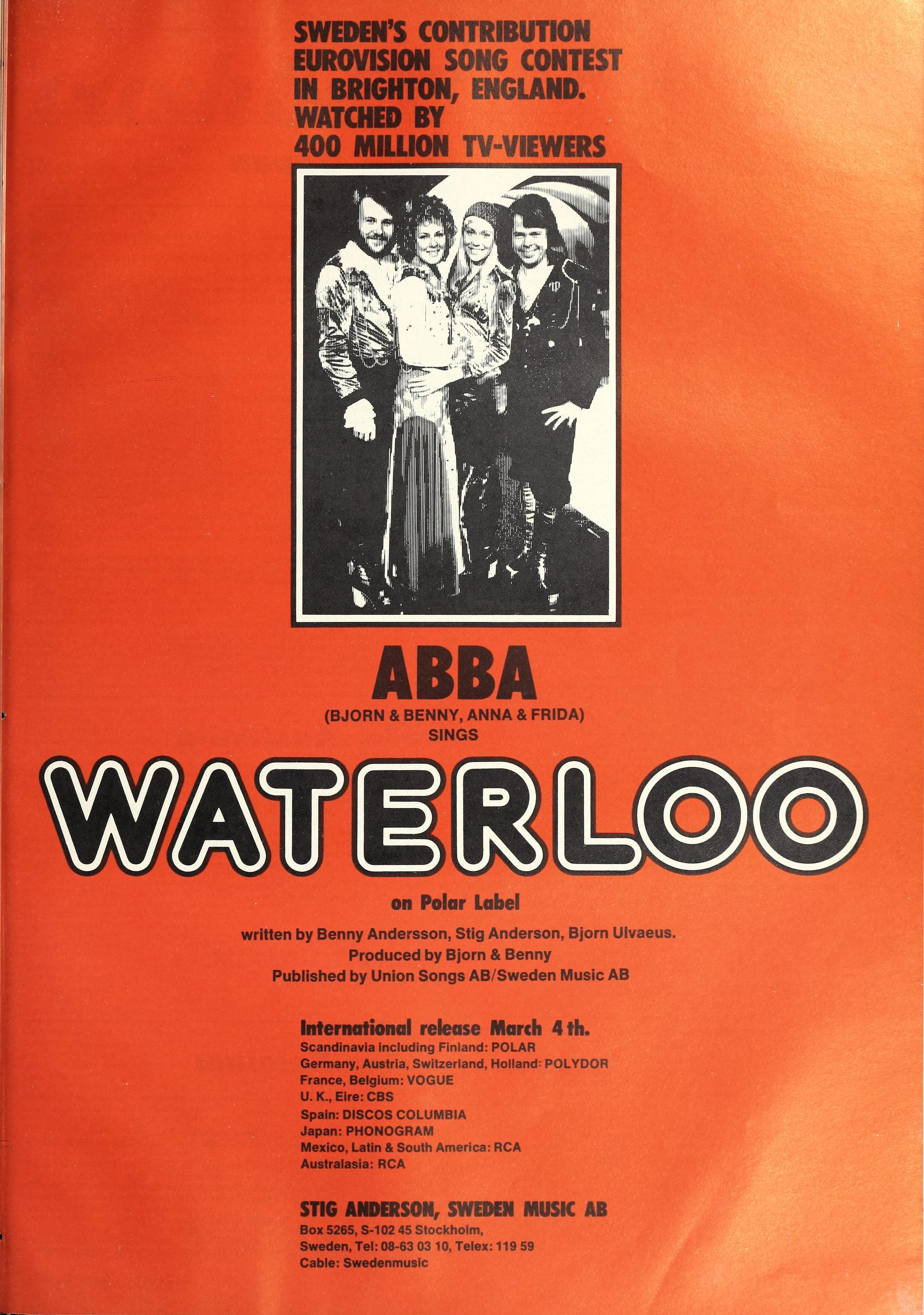
Cashbox advertisement, 9 March 1974

Cash Box said that this "is not a brash rocker, it's just solid rock with a very competent lady up front." Record World said that "Napoleon's downfall shall be this act's victory."

Harry Witchel, physiologist and music expert at the University of Bristol, named "Waterloo" the quintessential Eurovision song.

In 2017, Billboard ranked the song number 9 on their list of the 15 greatest ABBA songs, and in 2021, Rolling Stone ranked the song number 10 on their list of the 25 greatest ABBA songs.

== Commercial performance ==
The song shot to No. 1 in the UK and stayed there for two weeks, becoming the first of the band's nine UK No. 1's, and the 16th biggest selling single of the year in the UK. It also topped the charts in Belgium, Denmark, Finland, West Germany, Ireland, Norway, South Africa, and Switzerland, while reaching the Top 3 in Austria, France, the Netherlands, Spain, and ABBA's native Sweden. (The song was immensely popular in Sweden, but did not reach No. 1 there due to Sweden having a combined Album and Singles Chart at the time: at the peak of the song's popularity, its Swedish and English versions reached No. 2 and No. 3, respectively, while the No. 1 spot was held by the album Waterloo.) The song also spent 11 weeks on Svensktoppen (24 March – 2 June 1974), including 7 weeks at No. 1.

As of September 2021, it is ABBA's eleventh-biggest song in the UK, including both pure sales and digital streams.

Atlantic Records had acquired the rights to release "Waterloo" which involved a rush-release in May 1974 and a heavy promotional campaign in the USA and Canada.

Unlike other Eurovision-winning tunes, the song's appeal transcended Europe: "Waterloo" also reached the Top 10 in Australia, Canada, New Zealand, Rhodesia, and the United States (peaking at No. 6, their third-highest-charting US hit after No. 1 "Dancing Queen" in 1977 and No. 3 "Take a Chance on Me" in 1978). The Waterloo album performed similarly well in Europe, although in the US it failed to match the success of the single.

== Charts ==
=== Weekly charts (Swedish version) ===
Chart (1974)	Peak position
Sweden (Kvällstoppen)	2
Sweden (Svensktoppen)	1

==== Year-end charts (Swedish version) ====
Chart (1974)	Peak position
Sweden (Svensktoppen)	1

=== Weekly charts (English version) ===
Chart (1974)	Peak position
Australia (Kent Music Report)	4
Austria (Ö3 Austria Top 40)	2
Belgium (Ultratop 50 Flanders)	1
Belgium (Ultratop 50 Wallonia)	1
Canada (RPM)	7
Denmark (IFPI)	1
Finland (Mitä Suomi soittaa)	1
France (IFOP)	4
Ireland (IRMA)	1
Italy (Musica e dischi)	15
Netherlands (Dutch Top 40)	2
Netherlands (Single Top 100)	1
New Zealand (Listener)	3
Norway (VG-lista)	1
Rhodesia (Lyons Maid)	2
South Africa (Springbok Radio)	1
Spain (PROMUSICAE)	3
Sweden (Kvällstoppen)	1
Sweden (Tio i Topp)	1
Switzerland (Schweizer Hitparade)	1
UK Singles (Official Charts)	1
US Billboard Hot 100	6
US Cash Box Top 100	10
West Germany (GfK)	1

2026 weekly chart performance
Chart (2026)	Peak position
Israel International Airplay (Media Forest)	8

=== Year-end charts (English version) ===
Chart (1974)	Position
Australia (Kent Music Report)	36
Austria (Ö3 Austria Top 40)	7
Belgium (Ultratop Flanders)	12
Canada (RPM)	67
France (IFOP)	25
Netherlands (Dutch Top 40)	14
Netherlands (Single Top 100)	12
South Africa (Springbok Radio)	14
Switzerland (Schweizer Hitparade)	2
UK Singles (OCC)	16
US Billboard Hot 100	49
US Cash Box Top 100	84
West Germany (Official German Charts)	5

=== Certifications and sales ===
Region	Certification	Certified units/sales
Belgium	—	200,000
Denmark (IFPI Danmark)	Gold	45,000^{‡}
France	—	500,000
Kenya	—	10,000
New Zealand (RMNZ)	2× Platinum	60,000^{‡}
Portugal	—	20,000
Spain (Promusicae)	Gold	30,000^{‡}
United Kingdom (BPI) Original release	Silver	498,000
United Kingdom (BPI)	Platinum	600,000^{‡}
United States	—	800,000
Yugoslavia	Gold	100,000
Summaries
Worldwide	—	5,000,000
^{‡} Sales+streaming figures based on certification alone.

== Release history ==
Region	Date	Title	Label	Format	Catalog	Reference
Sweden	4 March 1974	"Waterloo" (Swedish) / "Honey, Honey" (Swedish)	Polar	Single	POS 1186	
Sweden	4 March 1974	"Waterloo" (English) / "Watch Out"	Polar	Single	POS 1187	
France	March 1974	"Waterloo" (French) / "Gonna Sing You My Lovesong"	Vogue	Single	45. X. 3104	
UK	5 Apr 1974	"Waterloo" / "Watch Out"	Epic	Single	EPC 2240	
Spain	April 1974	"Waterloo" / "Watch Out"	Carnaby	Single	MO 1403	
West Germany	April 1974	"Waterloo" / "Watch Out"	Polydor	Single	2040 114	
West Germany	1974	"Waterloo" (German) / "Watch Out"	Polydor	Single	2040 116	
US	May 1974	"Waterloo" / "Watch Out"	Atlantic	Single	45-3035	

== Legacy ==
=== Mamma Mia! Here We Go Again ===
"Waterloo" is featured in the 2018 film Mamma Mia! Here We Go Again performed by Hugh Skinner, as Young Harry, and Lily James, as Young Donna. This version was released on 1 June 2018 as the second single from the Mamma Mia! Here We Go Again: The Movie Soundtrack album, by Capitol and Polydor Records. It was produced by Benny Andersson.

==== Charts ====
Chart (2018)	Peak position
Hungary (Single Top 40)	40
Scottish Singles Sales (Official Charts)	70

==== Certifications ====
Region	Certification	Certified units/sales
United Kingdom (BPI)	Silver	200,000^{‡}
^{‡} Sales+streaming figures based on certification alone.

=== Other cover versions ===
- In 1986, Doctor and the Medics covered the song, reaching number 45 in the UK charts; Roy Wood, formerly lead singer of The Move and Wizzard and writer of "See My Baby Jive" performed saxophone and backing vocals. He also appeared in the video, as did Katie Boyle, Lemmy and Captain Sensible.
- In 2018, Cher covered the song on her ABBA covers album Dancing Queen. During her Here We Go Again Tour she performed "Waterloo" together with "SOS" and "Fernando". On 31 October 2018, "The Shoop Shoop Song (It's in His Kiss)" and "Take Me Home" were cut from her Classic Cher concert residency and "Waterloo", "SOS" and "Fernando" were added. On 18 September 2019, Cher also performed "Waterloo" at the season 14 finale of America's Got Talent, to promote the album and her Here We Go Again Tour.

=== Musicals ===
- The song is featured in the encore of the musical Mamma Mia! The song does not have a context or a meaning within the musical; rather, it is merely performed as a musical number in which members of the audience are encouraged to sing, dance and clap along.
- The song is performed by the cast over the closing credits of the film Mamma Mia!, but is not featured on the official soundtrack. The song is also performed in the sequel, Mamma Mia! Here We Go Again, by Hugh Skinner and Lily James.

=== Appearances in other media ===
- ABBA perform parts of the song live in the 1977 film ABBA: The Movie.
- The Australian film Muriel's Wedding (1994), features "Waterloo" in a pivotal scene in which lead Toni Collette bonds with the character played by Rachel Griffiths. The film's soundtrack, featuring five ABBA tracks, is widely regarded as having helped to fuel the revival of popular interest in ABBA's music in the mid-1990s.
- "Waterloo" features prominently in the 2015 science-fiction film The Martian. The song plays as the film's lead, played by Matt Damon, works to ready his launch vehicle for a last-chance escape from Mars.
- "Here I Go Again", the 11th episode of the third season of Legends of Tomorrow (19 February 2018), begins in medias res, with the titular time-traveling team having apparently just restored a time-transplanted Napoleon from the 1970s, where he had come into possession of a copy of the record. The song is also stuck in the head of one member of the team, until he erases his own memory to get it out.
- In "Mother Simpson", the eighth episode of the seventh season of The Simpsons, Mr. Burns plays "Ride of the Valkyries" from a tank about to storm the Simpson home, but the song is cut-off and "Waterloo" is played, to which Smithers apologizes, advising he "must have accidentally taped over that".

Preceded by "Tu te reconnaîtras" by Anne-Marie David	Eurovision Song Contest winners 1974	Succeeded by "Ding-a-dong" by Teach-In
