= Shadow Zen =

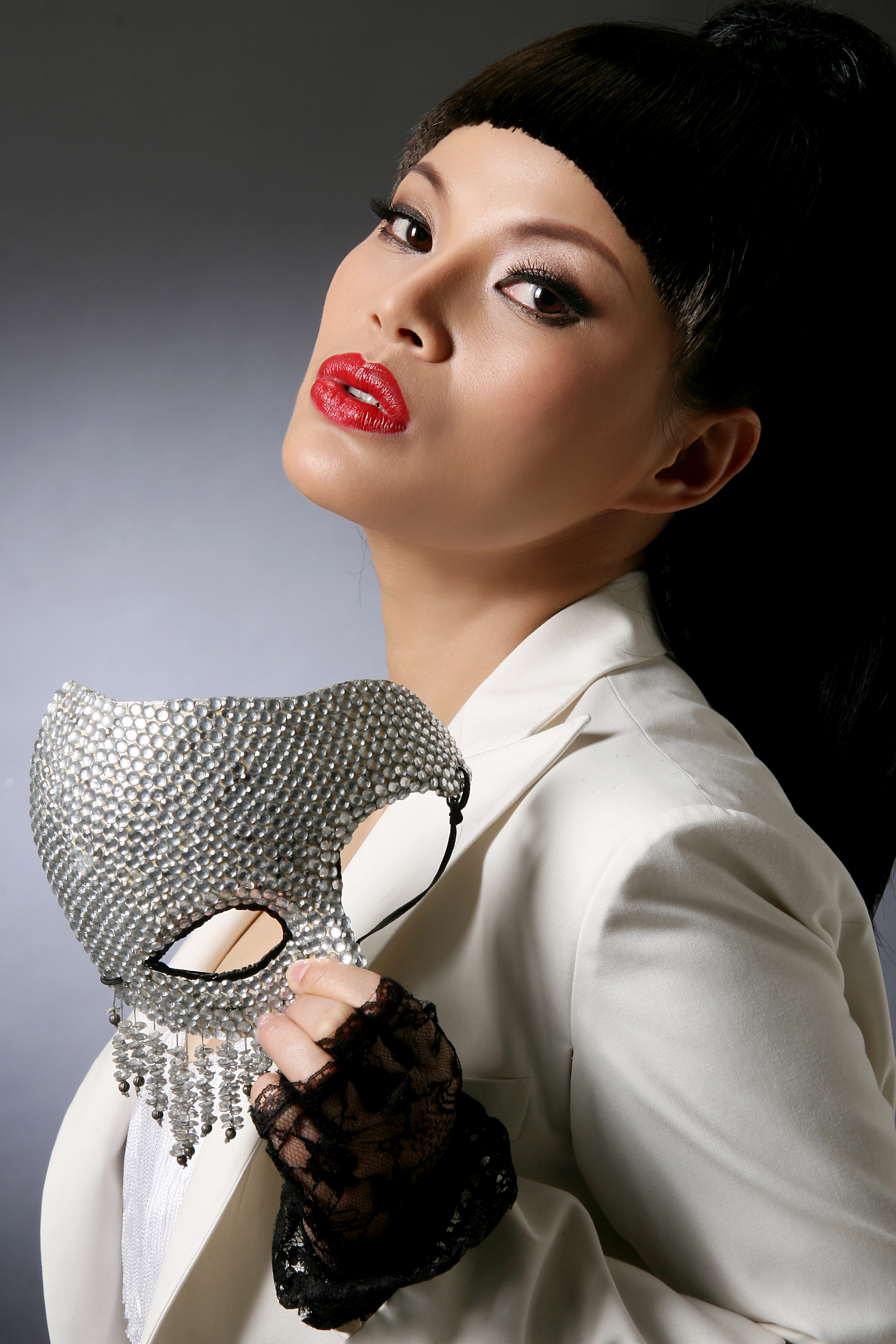
- Shadow Zen
- Born: Shadow Y. Zen; August 16, 1991 (age 34); Shanghai, China
- Occupations: Actress, singer, author, TV celebrity
- Years active: 2016–present
- Website: Official website

Zhang Aojia, known by her stage name Shadow Zen, (born 16 August 1979) is a Chinese actress, singer, author and TV celebrity, who is well known as China's Musical Queen. She is currently working on a world-wide stage by living both in Europe and Shanghai.

== Early life and career ==
Shadow was born in Shanghai. She began her stage training at the age of nine at Shanghai Children's Theatre. After graduating from Shanghai International Studies University, she went on to train at Chicago College of Performing Arts (Roosevelt University) majoring in Musical Theatre Performance. She returned to China in 2005 after her graduation from Chicago College of Performing Arts.

== Musical theatre roles ==
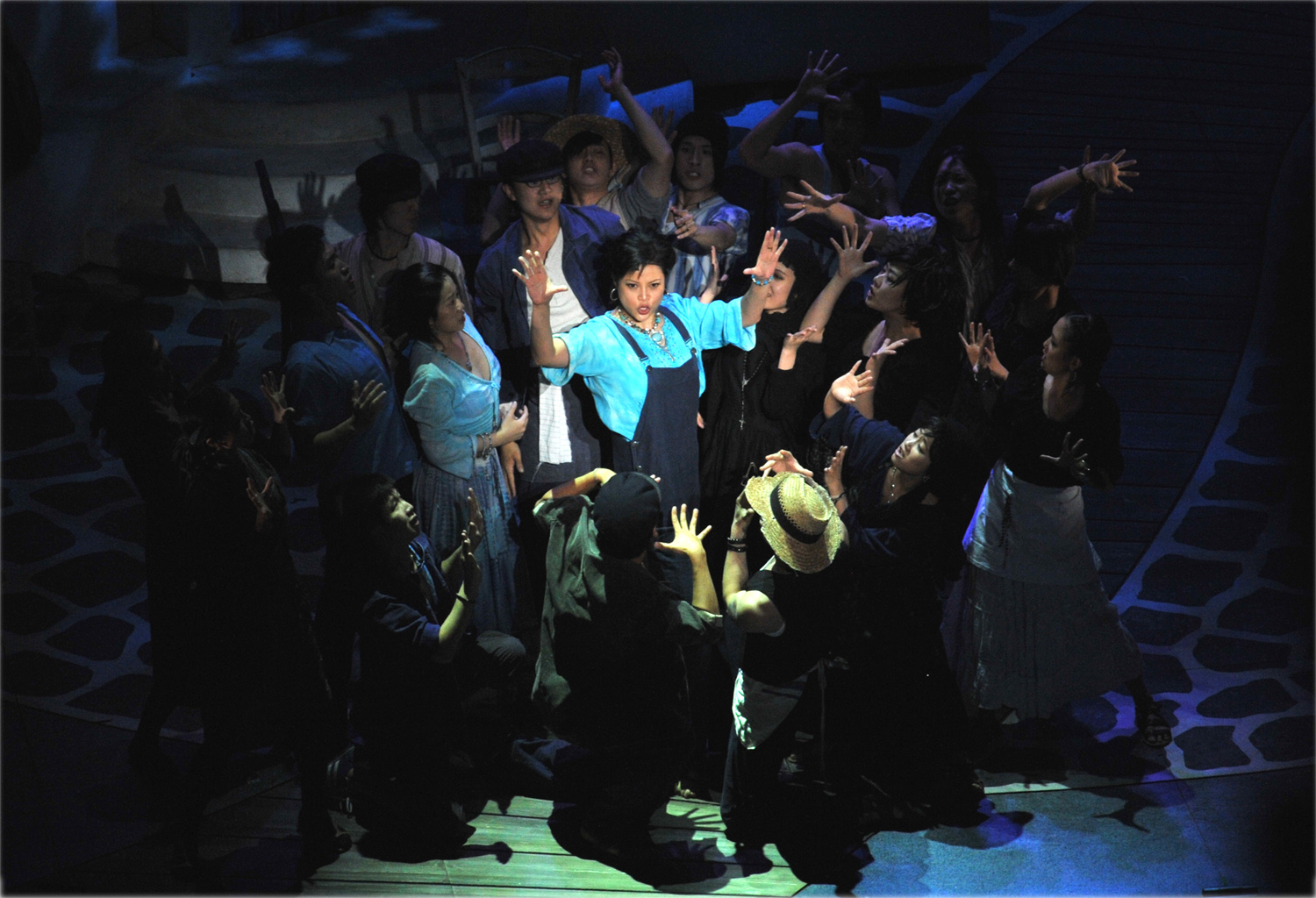
Shadow as Donna Sheridan

Leading roles in both original production and national tour of Challenge 3 VS. 3 (2002, Shanghai Children's Theatre), Drinking with the Stranger (2003, Shanghai Hardhan Theatre), Musical of the Night (2004, Shanghai Yi Hai Theatre), Jin Sha (2005, Beijing Poly Theatre), Sunrise (2006, Beijing Tian Qiao Theatre), The Beautiful Warrior (2007, Beijing Music Hall);

Leading roles and playwright in both original production and national tour of I Dreamed A Dream (2009, Beijing Capital Theatre), Me (2011, Shanghai 800 show Theatre) and Miss Shanghai (Bilingual, 2012, Shanghai Center Theatre);

From 2011 to 2013, Shadow played Donna Sheridan in Little Star's Chinese production of Mamma Mia!, which has already run 400 shows for the whole three seasons.

== Other musical works ==
She has her cabaret theatre show About Musical throughout China since 2007.

== Concert performances ==
As a concert artist, Shadow has appeared with Brandenburg Philharmonic Orchestra in New Year Concert of Opera and Musical Experts at Great Hall of the People, with China Opera and Dance Drama Theatre Orchestra in solo concert Shadow of Musical at Beijing Concert Hall, with Beijing Symphony Orchestra in Concert featuring Composer Jin Xiang’ s Opera and Musical Works at Beijing Music Hall, with Shanghai Symphony Orchestra in Classic and Famous Broadway at Shanghai Music Hall, and with Shanghai Broadcasting Symphony Orchestra in solo concert Best of Musicals at Shanghai Grand Theatre.

== Recordings ==
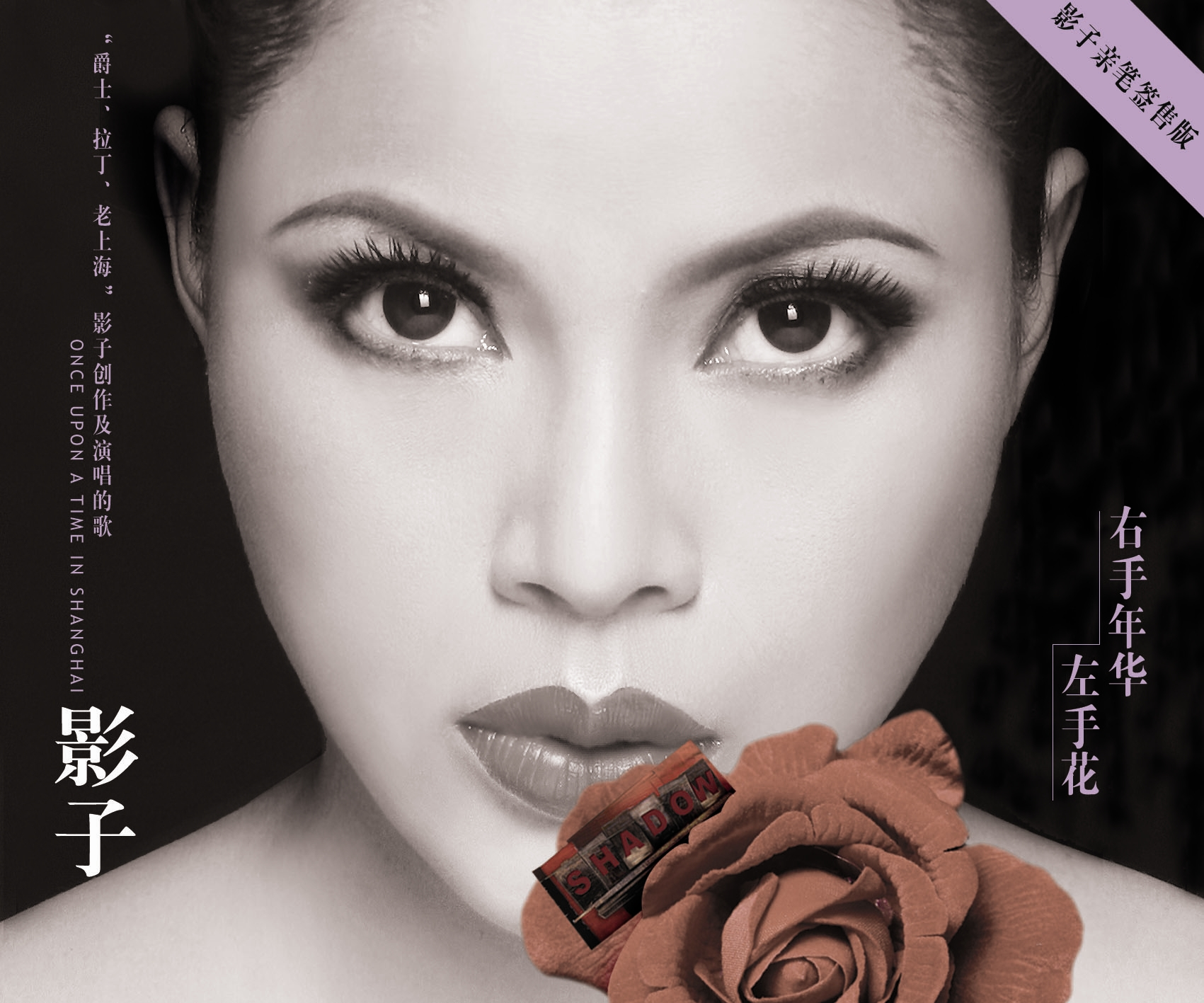
Once upon A Time in Shanghai

Shadow has made two solo recordings of the musical selections, Shadow at Broadway and Shadow at West End, two cast recordings of the musical Jin Sha and I Dreamed A Dream, one soundtrack album of the TV serials Once upon a Time in Shanghai. She has also recorded a bilingual world music solo album Go East.

== Film and television appearances ==
The Line Man (TV serials, 2004), The Longest Evening in Shanghai (movie, 2005), Flowers in the Storm (TV serials, 2006), Phoenix Talking Show (TV program, 2007), Women One Village (TV program, 2008), Super Boy (TV music show, 2010), No.1 Mission (TV reality show, 2010), Let us Sing Love Songs! (TV music show, 2010), Super Girl (TV music show, 2010), Sparkling Red Star (TV program, 2012), Women One Village (TV program, 2012), Legend of Music (TV program, 2012), Perfect Voice (TV music show, 2012), Dance Club (TV reality show, 2012), Perfect Voice (TV music show, 2012), Legend of Songs (TV music show, 2013).

== Activities ==
Shadow is a guest professor at Beijing Dance Academy, Central Academy of Fine Arts, Queens College New York (CUNY) of their Musical Theater Performance Department (major), and she is currently hosting her musical production label, the Modern Shadow Company of Performing Arts.
