= Christine Sherrill =

American musical theatre actress

- Education: Northern Illinois University (BFA); Saint Xavier University (MA)
- Occupations: Actress; singer
- Years active: 2006–present
- Spouse: Nick Placek
- Children: 3

Christine McMahon Sherrill is an American actress and singer known for her work in musical theatre. She portrayed the role of Donna Sheridan in the 2025 Broadway revival of Mamma Mia!. She had previously played the role of Donna in the North American Tour.

Sherrill is a graduate of Streamwood High School. She studied music education at Northern Illinois University and went on to earn a master of education from Saint Xavier University. She originally intended on becoming a music therapist.

Sherrill is known for her work in the Chicago area, and has been nominated for three Jeff Awards, winning Best Lead Actress in a Musical for her performance as Norma Desmond in Sunset Boulevard in 2013 at the Drury Lane Oakbrook Terrace Theatre. She was also nominated for her performance as Lina Lamont in Singin in the Rain and for the role of Celeste in the original musical Once Upon a Time in New Jersey at the Marriott Theatre. In 2015, she starred alongside Carmen Cusack and Faith Prince in the musical version of First Wives Club.

She is married to Nick Placek with whom she has three sons.
