= What About Livingstone =

Song by ABBA

from the album Waterloo
- Released: 4 March 1974
- Genre: Pop
- Length: 2:54
- Label: Polar
- Songwriters: Benny Andersson & Björn Ulvaeus
- Producers: Benny Andersson & Björn Ulvaeus

Audio video
- "What About Livingstone" on YouTube

"What About Livingstone" is a song by ABBA, released on their 1974 album Waterloo.

== Synopsis ==
The song is about the 19th-century British missionary and explorer David Livingstone. The Guardian described it as a song that "admonished Swedish youth for their disinterest in great explorers".

The song mentions Livingstone "travelling up the Nile". Livingstone made four great journeys into Africa, three of them starting in Cape Town, South Africa and the last in Zanzibar. None of the routes travelled on the Nile which lay far to the north. He may have crossed sections of the headwaters of Nile on his final expedition but he would not have known so as these areas were not considered to be in the Nile watershed until much later.

== Composition ==
The vocals are provided by Agnetha and Frida. The song has a "catchy bass synth riff" in the chorus. An "innovative vocal countermelody" in these choruses marks the start of a "steady rise in complexity when it came to vocal arrangements".

== Critical reception ==
The Guardian said the song had "weird lyrics". The Telegraph seems baffled that such a song exists, commenting "believe it or not, there’s an Abba song called What About Livingstone?". Abba - Uncensored on the Record suggests What About Livingstone and King Kong Song were novelty songs. It said What About Livingstone was "catchy" and "nice", though adds that there is nothing special about it. Bright Lights Dark Shadows: The Real Story of Abba says that both songs "get by on their whimsical charm".
