= Honey, Honey =

1974 single by ABBA

- Danish picture sleeve

Single by ABBA

from the album Waterloo
- A-side: "Ring Ring" (Austria, Germany, New Zealand, Switzerland)
- B-side: "King Kong Song" (Sweden, Denmark, Belgium); "Dance (While the Music Still Goes On)" (Australia, Canada, US); "Hasta Mañana" (Netherlands, Spain)
- Released: April 1974
- Recorded: January 1974
- Genre: Europop
- Length: 2:56
- Songwriters: Benny Andersson; Björn Ulvaeus; Stig Anderson
- Producers: Benny Andersson; Björn Ulvaeus

ABBA singles chronology
"Waterloo" (1974)	"Honey, Honey" (1974)	"Hasta Mañana" (1974)

Audio video
- "Honey, Honey" on YouTube

"Honey, Honey" is a song by the Swedish pop group ABBA. It was released as the second single in selected countries only, from their second studio album, Waterloo, after the success of the title track at the 1974 Eurovision Song Contest.

== History ==
"Honey, Honey" was written by Björn Ulvaeus, Benny Andersson and Stig Anderson, with shared vocals by Agnetha Fältskog, Anni-Frid Lyngstad and Ulvaeus. Along with the English version, ABBA also recorded "Honey, Honey" in Swedish on January 30, 1974, at Metronome Studio, Stockholm.

This was the last official recording by the group in their own language, and was released as the B-side of the Swedish "Waterloo" single. In its English format, "Honey, Honey" was released with "King Kong Song" as the B-side.

== Reception ==
"Honey, Honey" was released in several European countries, the United States, Australia and New Zealand, but not in the UK. ABBA's British record label, Epic Records, decided to release a remixed version of "Ring Ring" instead of "Honey, Honey". However, this single only reached No. 32, and a cover version of "Honey, Honey" recorded by the act Sweet Dreams, featuring vocalist Polly Brown, hit the UK top 10.

"Honey, Honey" spent 4 months in the top 5 in West Germany and also reached the top 5 in Austria, Spain and Switzerland. In the United States, "Honey, Honey" was moderately successful compared to the group's later singles. It reached No. 27 on both the Billboard Hot 100 and Adult Contemporary charts; the first ABBA single to reach the AC chart.

Cash Box called it "a sweet pop rocker, featuring tight harmonies and excellent production." Record World said that "the Scandinavian rockers take on a gentle, caloric, self-penned side."

== Track listing ==
No.	Title	Writer(s)	Length
1.	"Honey Honey"	Andersson; Anderson; Ulvaeus	2:56
2.	"Dance (While the Music Still Goes On)"	Ulvaeus; Andersson	3:05

== Official versions ==
- "Honey, Honey" (English version)
- "Honey, Honey" (Swedish version)

== Personnel ==
ABBA

- Agnetha Fältskog – lead and backing vocals
- Anni-Frid Lyngstad – lead and backing vocals
- Björn Ulvaeus – lead and backing vocals, rhythm guitar
- Benny Andersson – backing vocals, keyboards

Additional personnel and production staff

- Janne Schaffer – lead guitar
- Rutger Gunnarsson – bass
- Ola Brunkert – drums
- Martin Bylund, Anders Dahl, Gunnar Michols, Claes Nilsson, Åke Jelving, Inge Lindstedt, Alfred Pisuke, Sixten Strömvall, Harry Teike, Kryztof Zdrzalka – violins

== Charts ==
=== Weekly charts ===
Chart (1974)	Peak position
Australia (Kent Music Report)	30
Austria (Ö3 Austria Top 40)	4
Belgium (Ultratop 50 Flanders)	19
Belgium (Ultratop 50 Wallonia)	22
Canada Adult Contemporary (RPM)	8
Canada Top Singles (RPM)	18
Denmark (IFPI)	10
Finland (Suomen virallinen lista)	14
Netherlands (Dutch Top 40)	16
Netherlands (Single Top 100)	17
Spain (PROMUSICAE)	16
Switzerland (Schweizer Hitparade)	4
US Billboard Hot 100	27
US Adult Contemporary (Billboard)	27
US Cash Box Top 100 Singles	37
West Germany (GfK)	2

Chart (2008)	Peak position
Norway (VG-lista)	16

Chart (2022)	Peak position
Hungary (Single Top 40)	20

=== Year-end charts ===
Chart (1974)	Position
Canada Top Singles (RPM)	177
US (Joel Whitburn's Pop Annual)	183

== Certifications ==
Region	Certification	Certified units/sales
United Kingdom (BPI)	Silver	200,000^{‡}
^{‡} Sales+streaming figures based on certification alone.

== Release history ==
Region	Date	Title	Label	Format	Catalog	Reference
Denmark, Norway	14 Apr 1974	"Honey Honey" / "King Kong Song"	Polar	7-inch vinyl	POS 1192	
Austria, Germany, Switzerland	May 1974	"Ring Ring" (Note: 1974 Remix) / "Honey Honey" (Note: B-side flipped over for charts.)	Polydor	7-inch vinyl	2040 120	
Belgium	July 1974	"Honey Honey" / "King Kong Song"	Vogue	7-inch vinyl	45V. 3137	
Australia	Sep 1974	"Honey Honey" / "Dance (While the Music Still Goes On)"	RCA Victor	7-inch vinyl	102514	
Canada, USA	1 Sep 1974	"Honey Honey" / "Dance (While the Music Still Goes On)"	Atlantic	7-inch vinyl	45-3209	
USA	1 Sep 1974	"Honey Honey" / "Honey Honey"	Atlantic	7-inch vinyl, promo	45-3209	
Spain	Aug 1974	"Honey Honey" / "Hasta Mañana"	Carnaby	7-inch vinyl	MO 1428	
Netherlands	Nov 1974	"Honey Honey" / "Hasta Mañana"	Polydor	7-inch vinyl	2040 124	
New Zealand	Nov 1974	"Ring Ring" / "Honey Honey" (Note: Double A-side)	Family Label	7-inch vinyl	FAY 1093	
New Zealand	Dec 1974	"Honey Honey" / "Dance (While the Music Still Goes On)"	RCA Victor	7-inch vinyl	102514	
Brazil	1974	"Honey Honey" / "Dance (While the Music Still Goes On)"	RCA Victor	7-inch vinyl	101.8019	
Yugoslavia	1974	"Honey Honey" / "Ring Ring"	PGP RTB	7-inch vinyl	S 53795	
Poland	1975	"Honey Honey" / "My Mama Said"	Polskie Nagrania Muza	7-inch vinyl	S-606	
Worldwide	6 April 2024	"Honey Honey" / "King Kong Song"	Polar	7-inch vinyl, picture disc	00602455882219	

== Cover versions ==
- In 1974, British band Sweet Dreams which reached No. 10 in the UK and No. 14 in Ireland. In the U.S. the Sweet Dreams version debuted on the Hot 100 in Billboard two weeks prior to the ABBA original but ultimately lost out to the latter, the peak of the Sweet Dreams version being No. 68. In Canada, the song reached No. 59. Both the Sweet Dreams and ABBA versions of "Honey, Honey" also charted concurrently in Germany, with Sweet Dreams being the less successful with a No. 42 peak. Record World said of this version that the song "gets a spirited British reading from a group combining the old Supremes sound with very contemporary well-tempered synthesizer."
- The 2008 film Mamma Mia! features the song being sung by Amanda Seyfried (as Sophie), with Ashley Lilley (as Ali) and Rachel McDowall (as Lisa) on backup vocals. As in the stage musical itself, the vocals in the bridge are replaced with an instrumental version. This recording made No. 61 in the UK singles chart dated 2 August 2008, and No. 50 on the Australian singles charts. Released on download sales alone, it was credited to simply 'Original Cast Recording'. In 2023, the version was certified gold in the UK.
