= Hasta Mañana =

- Italian picture sleeve

Single by ABBA

from the album Waterloo
- A-side: "Honey, Honey" (Netherlands, Spain)
- B-side: "Watch Out" (Italy, South Africa)
- Released: 1974
- Recorded: December 18, 1973
- Studio: Metronome, Stockholm, Sweden
- Genre: Pop; Europop
- Length: 3:09
- Songwriters: Benny Andersson, Björn Ulvaeus, Stig Anderson
- Producers: Benny Andersson, Björn Ulvaeus

ABBA singles chronology
"Honey, Honey" (1974)	"Hasta Mañana" (1974)	"So Long" (1974)

Audio video
- "Hasta Mañana" on YouTube

"Hasta Mañana" (Spanish for "Until tomorrow" or "see you tomorrow") is the fourth track on Swedish pop group ABBA's second studio album, Waterloo. It was released in 1974 as the album's third and final single.

== Background ==
Initially fearing that "Waterloo" might be too risky to enter for the 1974 Eurovision Song Contest, the group considered performing the ballad "Hasta Mañana" instead, as they thought that it was more in style with previous Eurovision winners. Eventually, they decided on "Waterloo", primarily because it featured Agnetha Fältskog and Anni-Frid Lyngstad sharing lead vocals, whereas "Hasta Mañana" had Fältskog as the sole lead vocalist. ABBA believed that this would give the wrong impression of them to the world.

The song was still known under its original working title "Who's Gonna Love You?" when the backing track was recorded. The lyrics were later written by Stig Anderson while on a Christmas holiday to the Canary Islands and dictated over the telephone.

While the song was being recorded, they decided to give up on it at one point because none of them could sing it properly. Agnetha alone was in the studio and decided to play around with it. She felt that if she could sing it in a Connie Francis style it would work — and it did.

In Australia, "Hasta Mañana" was used as a B-side on the "So Long" single (which never charted). After being featured in the popular The Best of ABBA TV Special, broadcast in March 1976, the song was re-released and became a Top 20 hit in Australia and Top 10 hit in New Zealand.

It reached number 2 on the charts in South Africa in November 1974.

== Charts ==
Chart (1974)	Peak position
Italy (Musica e dischi)	28
South Africa (Springbok Radio)	2
Sweden (Tio i Topp)	1

Chart (1976)	Peak position
Australia (Kent Music Report)	16
New Zealand (Recorded Music NZ)	9

Chart (1980)	Peak position
Argentina (CAPIF)	4

The Boones cover

Chart (1977)	Peak position
Canada Adult Contemporary (RPM)	37
US Easy Listening (Billboard)	32

== Release history ==
Region	Date	Title	Label	Format	Catalog	Reference
South Africa, Madagascar	Sep 1974	"Hasta Mañana" / "Watch Out"	Sunshine, EMI	7-inch vinyl	SUN 8, GBS 101	
Italy	1974	"Hasta Mañana" / "Watch Out"	Dig-It International Records	7-inch vinyl	MM 0031	
Japan	1974	"Hasta Mañana" / "Honey, Honey"	Philips	7-inch vinyl	SFL-1867	
Portugal	1974	"Hasta Mañana" / "Honey, Honey"	Polydor	7-inch vinyl	2040 124	
New Zealand	1975	"Hasta Mañana" / "So Long"	RCA Victor	7-inch vinyl	102560	
Argentina	1980	"Hasta Mañana (Spanish version)" / "Al Andar"	RCA Victor	7-inch vinyl	41A-3209	
Chile, Peru	1980	"Hasta Mañana (Spanish version)" / "Al Andar"	RCA Victor	7-inch vinyl	31028	

== Cover versions ==
- A recording by ABBA featuring Polar Music artist Lena Andersson on lead vocals was a 1974 Svensktoppen hit, as well as a cover version by dance band Schytts the same year. Lena Andersson also recorded German and Swedish language versions of the song, all using the original ABBA backing track. This recording was a Swedish #1 single in 1975.
- In 1977, American Christian singer Debby Boone, daughter of singer Pat Boone, included a cover of the song as the B-side of her 1977 #1 hit, "You Light Up My Life", which became the best-selling single of the 1970s. The family group The Boones had recorded and released an earlier version.
- In 1992, Swedish dance group Army of Lovers released a version on the Swedish compilation ABBA - The Tribute.
