= King Kong Song =

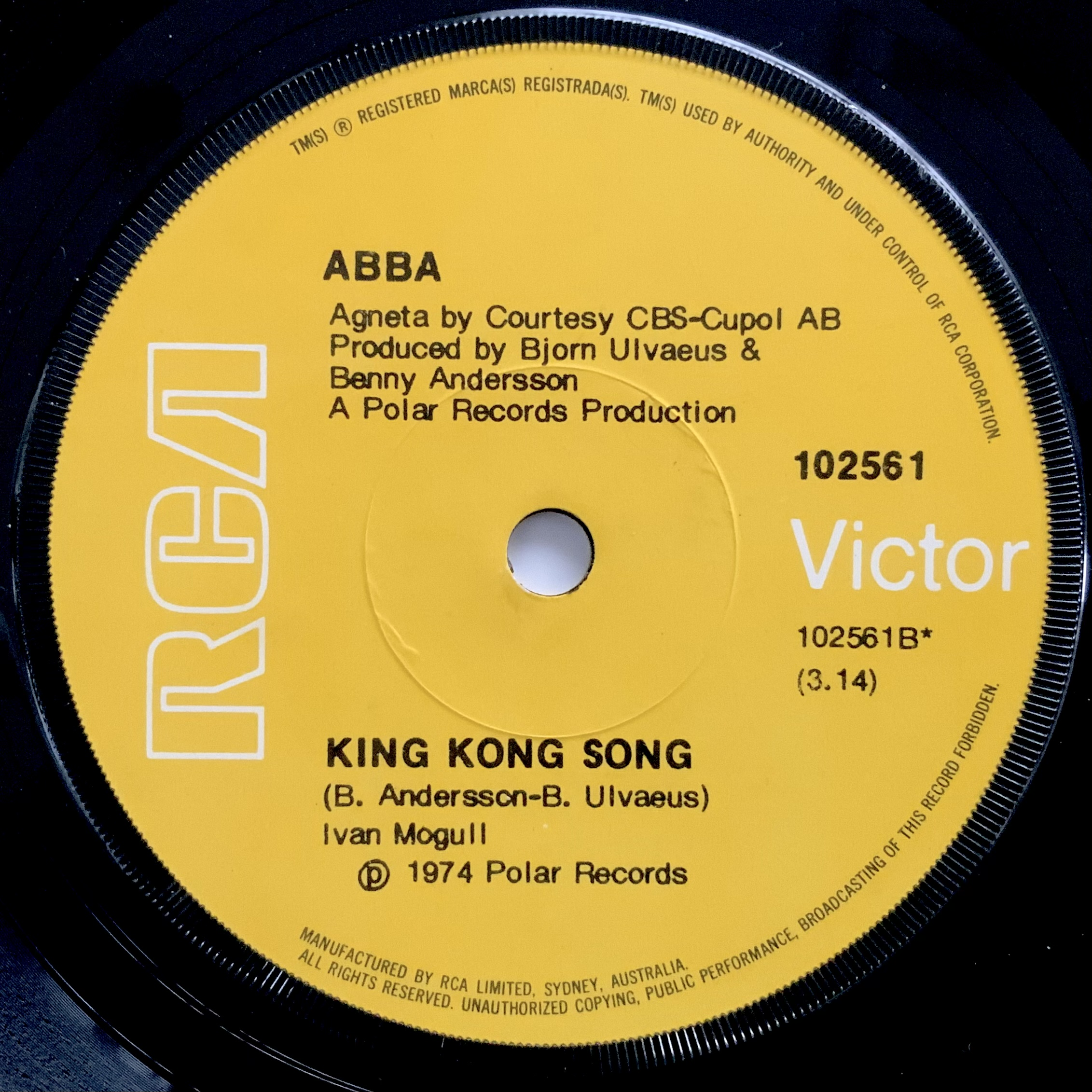

Song by ABBA

from the album Waterloo
- A-side: "Honey, Honey" (Sweden); "I've Been Waiting for You" (Australia, New Zealand)
- Released: November 1974
- Recorded: 14 November 1973
- Studio: Metronome, Stockholm
- Genre: Hard rock; glam rock; glam metal
- Length: 3:11
- Label: Polar Music
- Songwriters: Benny Andersson; Björn Ulvaeus
- Producers: Benny Andersson; Björn Ulvaeus

ABBA singles chronology
"So Long" (1974)	"King Kong Song" (1974)	"I Do, I Do, I Do, I Do, I Do" (1975)

Audio video
- "King Kong Song" on YouTube

"King Kong Song" (working title "Mr. Sex") is a song written and composed by Benny Andersson and Björn Ulvaeus and first recorded in 1973 by Swedish pop group ABBA, included on their album Waterloo. The songwriters later considered it one of their weakest tracks.

In 1974, the song competed in the Swedish radio chart show Tio i topp, where it stayed in the charts for four shows and peaked at number 4. "King Kong Song" was the international B-side to "Honey, Honey" and the B-side to "I've Been Waiting for You" in New Zealand and in Australia, where it reached number 49.

== Charts ==
Chart (1974–1975)	Peak position
Australia (Kent Music Report)	94
Sweden (Tio i Topp)	4
