= Sven-Olof Walldoff =

Swedish musician, composer, conductor, music arranger

- Born: 2 May 1929; Lerbäck, Sweden
- Died: 7 June 2011 (aged 82); Masthugget, Sweden
- Years active: 1956–2011

Sven-Olof Walldoff (2 May 1929 – 7 June 2011) was a Swedish record producer, composer and orchestra conductor who is best known for conducting the orchestra for ABBA's song "Waterloo" for the Eurovision Song Contest 1974, wearing a Napoleon costume.

Walldoff also collaborated on ABBA's first album Ring Ring. He has composed the music for the movies The Seduction of Inga, Georgia, Georgia, The White Wall, and Jungle Adventure Campa Campa. Besides ABBA, he also worked with Anita Lindblom, Agnetha Fältskog, Lill-Babs, Östen Warnerbring, Gunnar Wiklund, Zarah Leander, and Brita Borg.
