= Dance (While the Music Still Goes On) =

Song by ABBA

from the album Waterloo
- Released: 4 March 1974
- Recorded: 24 September 1973
- Genre: Pop rock
- Length: 3:05
- Label: Polar
- Songwriters: Björn Ulvaeus; Benny Andersson
- Producers: Björn Ulvaeus; Benny Andersson

"Dance (While The Music Still Goes On)" is a song written and recorded by the Swedish pop group ABBA, released in the 1974 album Waterloo. It was the first song written and recorded for the album, with work on the song beginning on 24 September 1973. The song is a love-ballad narrating the last dance in an ending romance.

== Composition ==
The song was written by Björn Ulvaeus and Benny Andersson. The vocals for the verses of the song were provided by Agnetha Fältskog. The lead-vocals sung during chorus were shared by all four band members, including Björn and Benny, a rarity for songs produced by the band. Notably, Dance (While the Music Still Goes On) is the only ABBA song not to feature Benny on the keyboard, but instead credits John Bundrick, an American pianist who was in Sweden at the time. The features multi-layered instruments, including electric guitar, background drumming, and a moog synthesizer, played by Benny Andersson.

The beat and melody of the song is heavily influenced by the sound of Phil Spector, specifically his work on the 1963 hit "Be My Baby" by the Ronettes. While creating the Waterloo album, Michael Tretow, ABBA's lead producer at the time, drew influence from the music book Out of His Head: The Sound of Phil Spector.

== Lyrics ==
"Dance (While The Music Still Goes On)" is written from the perspective of a lover encouraging their partner to make the most of their ending relationship and "dance". The lyrics urge the partner to forget about the uncertain future and enjoy the current moment: "It's gonna be our last goodbye, Don't think about tomorrow, Dance and forget our time is gone".

== Reception ==
Benny said of his song “It’s very close to those early sixties Phil Spector type of songs that we really liked." Carl Magnus Palm praised the 'title track' as a "piece of glam energy filtered through ABBA's Nordic Spector production values." AllMusic said the song "is on the money, as the embodiment of the Euro-disco sound". Based on the sales of the Waterloo album, Polar had considered to release "Dance (While The Music Still Goes On)" as a single.

== Svenne and Lotta version ==
"Dance (While The Music Still Goes On"

Single by Svenne & Lotta

from the album Svenne & Lotta/2
- B-side: "He Is Your Brother"
- Released: 1974
- Recorded: 1974
- Length: 3:15
- Label: Polar
- Songwriters: Benny Andersson; Björn Ulvaeus
- Producer: Claes af Geijerstam

Svenne & Lotta singles chronology
"Breakin' Up Is Hard to Do" (1973)	"Dance (While The Music Still Goes On" (1974)	"Bang-A-Boomerang" (1975)

In 1974, Svenne and Lotta Hedlund released a cover of ABBA's "Dance (While the Music Still Goes On)" as a single internationally with a version of "He Is Your Brother" as the B-side. In Denmark, where the duo gained popularity, the single peaked at number 2 in the Danish Top 10 chart. The song also appeared on the Swedish Poporama chart. The duo subsequently also recorded a Swedish language version, titled "Kom ta en sista dans med mig", peaking at number 2 in the Svensktoppen chart in June 1975.

== See also ==
- List of songs recorded by ABBA
