= Mamma Mia! The Movie Soundtrack =

Soundtrack album by Mamma Mia! film cast
- Released: July 8, 2008
- Recorded: 2007–2008
- Genre: Pop
- Length: 69:57
- Labels: Decca; Polydor
- Producers: Benny Andersson; Björn Ulvaeus (executive)

Mamma Mia! film cast chronology
Mamma Mia! The Movie Soundtrack (2008)	Mamma Mia! Here We Go Again: The Movie Soundtrack (2018)

Professional ratings
Review scores
Source	Rating
AllMusic	(negative)

Mamma Mia! The Movie Soundtrack is the soundtrack album for the 2008 jukebox musical film Mamma Mia!, based on the 1999 stage musical of the same name. Released on July 8, 2008, by Decca and Polydor Records in the United States and internationally, respectively, it features performances by the film's cast including Meryl Streep, Amanda Seyfried, Pierce Brosnan, Dominic Cooper, Stellan Skarsgård, Colin Firth, Julie Walters, Christine Baranski, Ashley Lilley, and Rachel McDowall. The recording was produced by Benny Andersson who along with Björn Ulvaeus had produced the original ABBA recordings. Additionally, many of the musicians from the original ABBA recordings participated in making the soundtrack album. In keeping with the setting, the musical arrangements featured the use of traditional Greek instruments, most noticeably the bouzouki. The deluxe edition of the soundtrack album was released on November 25, 2008.

The album was nominated for a Grammy Award for Best Compilation Soundtrack Album for Motion Picture, Television or Other Visual Media.

== Track listing ==
CD tracklist
No.	Title	Writer(s)	Performer(s)	Length
1.	"Honey, Honey"	Benny Andersson; Björn Ulvaeus; Stig Anderson	Amanda Seyfried; Ashley Lilley; Rachel McDowall	3:08
2.	"Money, Money, Money"	Andersson; Ulvaeus	Meryl Streep; Julie Walters; Christine Baranski	3:06
3.	"Mamma Mia"	Andersson; Ulvaeus; Anderson	Meryl Streep	3:34
4.	"Dancing Queen"	Andersson; Ulvaeus; Anderson	Meryl Streep; Julie Walters; Christine Baranski	4:04
5.	"Our Last Summer"	Andersson; Ulvaeus	Colin Firth; Pierce Brosnan; Stellan Skarsgård; Amanda Seyfried; Meryl Streep	2:57
6.	"Lay All Your Love on Me"	Andersson; Ulvaeus	Dominic Cooper; Amanda Seyfried	4:29
7.	"Super Trouper"	Andersson; Ulvaeus	Meryl Streep; Julie Walters; Christine Baranski	3:53
8.	"Gimme! Gimme! Gimme! (A Man After Midnight)"	Andersson; Ulvaeus	Amanda Seyfried; Ashley Lilley; Rachel McDowall	3:51
9.	"The Name of the Game"	Andersson; Ulvaeus; Anderson	Amanda Seyfried	4:55
10.	"Voulez-Vous"	Andersson; Ulvaeus	full cast	4:35
11.	"SOS"	Andersson; Ulvaeus; Anderson	Pierce Brosnan; Meryl Streep	3:19
12.	"Does Your Mother Know"	Andersson; Ulvaeus	Christine Baranski; Philip Michael	3:01
13.	"Slipping Through My Fingers"	Andersson; Ulvaeus	Meryl Streep; Amanda Seyfried	3:50
14.	"The Winner Takes It All"	Andersson; Ulvaeus	Meryl Streep	4:57
15.	"When All Is Said and Done"	Andersson; Ulvaeus	Pierce Brosnan; Meryl Streep	3:17
16.	"Take a Chance on Me"	Andersson; Ulvaeus	Julie Walters; Stellan Skarsgård; Colin Firth; Philip Michael; Christine Baranski	4:01
17.	"I Have a Dream"	Andersson; Ulvaeus	Amanda Seyfried	4:22
18.	"Thank You for the Music" (hidden track)	Andersson; Ulvaeus	Amanda Seyfried	3:44
Total length:				69:57

Notes

- On the CD pressings, "Thank You for the Music" is a hidden track which begins after 30 seconds of silence following "I Have a Dream", making track 17's total length 8:36.

iTunes version
No.	Title	Writer(s)	Length
17.	"I Have a Dream (ABBA)"	Andersson; Ulvaeus	4:22
18.	"Thank You for the Music (ABBA)"	Andersson; Ulvaeus	3:44

=== Deluxe edition ===
The Deluxe Edition of the soundtrack features the original soundtrack (with no new songs) and a bonus DVD that features a "Behind the Music" special that shows some of the recording process for the movie, as well as a music video for "Gimme! Gimme! Gimme! (A Man After Midnight)" featuring Amanda Seyfried. The booklet for the deluxe edition is different from the original, containing all the lyrics, an article written by Musical Director Martin Lowe, taping location info, and additional photos from the movie.

=== Limited vinyl edition ===
In 2017, a limited run of the soundtrack was released onto vinyl in the US, and was sold exclusively by Barnes & Noble. As part of 'Vinyl Week', in March 2018, HMV released an exclusive limited edition of the soundtrack on picture discs. With only 1000 produced, 2 are included which contain high quality images on both sides.

== Commercial performance ==
The album peaked at #1 in the USA on the Billboard 200 albums chart in August 2008. It was certified Platinum by the RIAA on August 18, 2008, and has sold 1,694,000 copies in the United States as of July 2014.

While the album was originally ineligible for the Official UK Albums Chart, it peaked atop the Official Soundtrack Albums Chart for 15 consecutive weeks and was outselling the top 10 albums in the UK Albums Chart. Following the release of Mamma Mia! Here We Go Again, the album entered the UK chart for the first time, peaking at number 5 on the chart. In New Zealand, the album debuted at number 8 on July 14, 2008, and climbed to number one the following week. In Greece, it peaked at number one on the international chart and number 1 on the main albums chart for many weeks. In Australia, the album reached #1 in its second week on the ARIA Albums Chart, knocking off the highly successful Coldplay album Viva la Vida or Death and All His Friends. In Austria, peaked at No. 1 for 6 weeks and returned to the top 10, at No. 8, 10 years after its release due to the release of the sequel Mamma Mia! Here We Go Again.

"Honey, Honey" has also charted at #16 on the Norwegian Singles Chart and #50 on the Australian ARIA Singles Chart, due to high download sales. Other tracks selling well enough to chart in Australia include "Gimme! Gimme! Gimme! (A Man After Midnight)" (#70), "Lay All Your Love on Me" (#85), "Dancing Queen" (#96) and "Mamma Mia" (#98).

== Personnel ==
=== Cast ===
- Amanda Seyfried as Sophie Sheridan
- Meryl Streep as Donna Sheridan
- Pierce Brosnan as Sam Carmichael
- Stellan Skarsgård as Bill Anderson
- Colin Firth as Harry Bright
- Julie Walters as Rosie Mulligan
- Christine Baranski as Tanya Chesham-Leigh
- Dominic Cooper as Sky
- Philip Michael as Pepper

=== Musicians ===
- Benny Andersson – piano, keyboards
- Rutger Gunnarsson – bass guitar, bouzouki
- Per Lindvall – drums
- Lasse Wellander – guitars, bouzouki
- Jörgen Stenberg – percussion
- Lasse Jonsson – acoustic guitars
- Jan Bengtson – flute, piccolo, baritone saxophone
- Pär Grebacken – recording, clarinet, saxophone
- Perra Moraeus – alto saxophone
- Leif Lindvall – trumpet
- Calle Jakobsson – tuba
- Kalle Moraeus – bouzouki, guitar, violin

== Charts ==
=== Weekly charts ===
Chart (2008)	Peak position
Argentine Albums (CAPIF)	8
Australian Albums (ARIA)	1
Austrian Albums (Ö3 Austria)	1
Belgian Albums (Ultratop Flanders)	5
Belgian Albums (Ultratop Wallonia)	7
Brazilian Albums (ABPD)	9
Canadian Albums (Billboard)	1
Croatian International Albums (HDU)	27
Czech Albums (ČNS IFPI)	1
Danish Albums (Hitlisten)	1
Dutch Albums (Album Top 100)	5
Europe (European Top 100 Albums)	3
Finnish Albums (Suomen virallinen lista)	1
French Albums (SNEP)	8
German Albums (Offizielle Top 100)	2
Greek Albums (IFPI)	1
Hungarian Albums (MAHASZ)	1
Irish Albums (IRMA)	23
Mexican Albums (Top 100 Mexico)	2
New Zealand Albums (RMNZ)	1
Norwegian Albums (VG-lista)	1
Polish Albums (ZPAV)	1
Portuguese Albums (AFP)	1
Russian Albums (2M)	20
Scottish Albums (Official Charts)	13
Slovenian Albums (IFPI)	1
Spanish Albums (Promusicae)	1
Swedish Albums (Sverigetopplistan)	1
Swiss Albums (Schweizer Hitparade)	1
UK Albums (Official Charts)	5
UK Compilation Albums (Official Charts)	1
UK Soundtrack Albums (Official Charts)	1
US Billboard 200	1
US Soundtrack Albums (Billboard)	1

Chart (2018)	Peak position
Polish Albums (ZPAV)	25
Scottish Albums (Official Charts)	4
UK Albums (Official Charts)	5
UK Soundtrack Albums (Official Charts)	2
US Billboard 200	21
US Soundtrack Albums (Billboard)	3

=== Year-end charts ===
Chart (2008)	Position
Australian Albums (ARIA)	6
Austrian Albums (Ö3 Austria)	3
Belgian Albums (Ultratop Flanders)	50
Belgian Albums (Ultratop Wallonia)	94
Canadian Albums (Billboard)	11
Dutch Albums (Album Top 100)	48
French Albums (SNEP)	99
German Albums (Offizielle Top 100)	23
New Zealand Albums (RMNZ)	3
Swiss Albums (Schweizer Hitparade)	12
US Billboard 200	24
US Soundtrack Albums (Billboard)	3

Chart (2009)	Position
Austrian Albums (Ö3 Austria)	21
French Albums (SNEP)	120
Swiss Albums (Schweizer Hitparade)	73
US Billboard 200	46
US Soundtrack Albums (Billboard)	5

Chart (2011)	Position
French Albums (SNEP)	140

Chart (2018)	Position
Irish Albums (IRMA)	32
UK Albums (OCC)	44
US Soundtrack Albums (Billboard)	22

Chart (2021)	Position
Icelandic Albums (Tónlistinn)	93

Chart (2022)	Position
Belgian Albums (Ultratop Flanders)	194
Icelandic Albums (Tónlistinn)	96

Chart (2023)	Position
Austrian Albums (Ö3 Austria)	64
Belgian Albums (Ultratop Flanders)	169

Chart (2024)	Position
Belgian Albums (Ultratop Flanders)	172

== Certifications ==
Region	Certification	Certified units/sales
Australia (ARIA)	2× Platinum	140,000^{^}
Belgium (BRMA)	Gold	15,000^{*}
Brazil (Pro-Música Brasil)	Platinum	60,000^{*}
Canada (Music Canada)	Platinum	80,000^{^}
Denmark (IFPI Danmark)	5× Platinum	100,000^{‡}
Finland (Musiikkituottajat)	Platinum	23,253
GCC (IFPI Middle East)	Platinum	6,000^{*}
Germany (BVMI)	Platinum	200,000^{^}
Greece (IFPI Greece)	2× Platinum	30,000^{^}
Hungary (MAHASZ)	6× Platinum	36,000^{‡}
Ireland (IRMA)	4× Platinum	60,000^{^}
Italy sales in 2008	—	105,000
Italy (FIMI) sales + streams since 2009	2× Platinum	100,000^{‡}
Lebanon (IFPI Middle East)	Platinum	2,000
Mexico (AMPROFON)	Gold	40,000^{^}
New Zealand (RMNZ)	4× Platinum	60,000^{‡}
Norway (IFPI Norway)	Platinum	30,000^{*}
Poland (ZPAV)	Diamond	100,000^{*}
Portugal (AFP)	2× Platinum	40,000^{^}
Russia (NFPF)	Platinum	20,000^{*}
Spain (Promusicae)	Platinum	80,000^{^}
Sweden (GLF)	3× Platinum	120,000^{^}
Switzerland (IFPI Switzerland)	Platinum	30,000^{^}
United Kingdom (BPI)	7× Platinum	2,100,000^{‡}
United States (RIAA)	Platinum	1,694,000
Summaries
Europe (IFPI)	3× Platinum	3,000,000^{*}
Worldwide	—	7,700,000
^{*} Sales figures based on certification alone.^{^} Shipments figures based on certification alone.^{‡} Sales+streaming figures based on certification alone.

== Accolades ==
- Grammy Award
  - Best Compilation Soundtrack Album for Motion Picture, Television or Other Visual Media—nominated
