= Judy Craymer =

English musical theatre producer

Judy Craymer CBE
- Born: Judith Sarah Jarman Craymer; 26 October 1957 (age 68); London, England
- Education: Mount School, Mill Hill; Guildhall School of Music and Drama
- Occupation: Theatre producer
- Notable work: Mamma Mia!
- Awards: CBE (2020), FGS

Judith Sarah Jarman Craymer CBE (born 26 October 1957) is an English creator and producer of musical theatre who has also worked in the film, television and music industries. She is the founder of Littlestar Services Ltd. Craymer worked on Mamma Mia!, which has been seen by more than 65 million people worldwide. Ten years after the film adaptation grossed more than $600 million around the world, Craymer produced an all-new original movie musical based on the songs of ABBA, Mamma Mia! Here We Go Again. Since opening in July 2018 the film has become the most successful live musical movie sequel of all time grossing just less than $400 million. Craymer was nominated for the "Carl Foreman award for special achievement by a British director, writer or producer in their first feature film" at the 62nd British Academy Film Awards for the film version of Mamma Mia! She has been dubbed "the greatest showbiz impresario" of the first decade of the 21st century and has consequently been entered in Debrett's.

== Life and career ==
Born in London in 1957, Judy Craymer graduated from the Guildhall School of Music and Drama in 1977. She worked as a stage manager for the Haymarket Theatre in Leicester, the Old Vic Theatre, London, on the original production of Cats for Cameron Mackintosh and for the Really Useful Theatre Company. In 1982 she became Tim Rice’s production assistant and went on to be executive producer for Chess.

In 1987, Craymer moved into film and television production. Her credits include White Mischief, starring Charles Dance and Greta Scacchi, and Neville's Island, starring Martin Clunes and Timothy Spall. Craymer also produced various live comedy specials for Channel 4.

In 1999, Craymer returned to her working partnership with Benny Andersson and Björn Ulvaeus. She had been nurturing an idea for several years after working with them on Chess which was to become Mamma Mia! It took Craymer 10 years to persuade Andersson and Ulvaeus to give her the rights to the songs. Craymer's inspiration for the musical was the song "The Winner Takes It All". They were impressed by the team Craymer had gathered around her to create the show; Phyllida Lloyd (a "cerebral director blessed with a popular touch") and "highly savvy writer" Catherine Johnson. In 1996 Craymer formed Littlestar Services Ltd with Andersson and Ulvaeus to produce Mamma Mia!, which opened at the Prince Edward Theatre in London's West End on 6 April 1999 and swiftly became a huge global success.

Mamma Mia! has become a global juggernaut since 1999, having now played in more than 40 countries in all six continents, and in 16 different languages. It has set the record for premiering in more cities faster than any other musical in history. The show has been nominated for numerous Olivier and Tony awards and was the first West End and Broadway musical to be performed in Chinese. Mamma Mia! is the 8th longest running show in Broadway history and one of only five musicals to have run for more than 10 years on the Great White Way. Mamma Mia! is in its 22nd year in London's West End at the Novello Theatre and has grossed over $2 billion at the box office.

This success naturally attracted the interest of Hollywood, and in 2005 and 2006 Craymer made a deal with Universal Pictures to make a film of Mamma Mia! Unusually for Hollywood, the project was helmed by the three women who created it, with Craymer, Phyllida Lloyd and Catherine Johnson reprising their roles as producer, director and writer on the film. Mamma Mia!, starring Meryl Streep, Pierce Brosnan, Colin Firth, Julie Walters and Christine Baranski, opened in 2008 and was the fifth highest-grossing film of the year. It is the highest worldwide grossing live action musical film of all time. It is also the UK's fastest and best selling DVD of all time, and in 2013, was announced as Amazon UK's best-selling DVD of all time.

More recently, Craymer also produced Viva Forever!, a musical based on the songs of the Spice Girls, which was written by Jennifer Saunders and opened at the Piccadilly Theatre in late 2012. According to critics, the show failed to reach the levels of other work she was associated with, despite it generating over £4,000,000 in pre-opening ticket sales.

Ten years after the film Mamma Mia! grossed more than $600 million around the world, Craymer produced an all-new original movie, extending her initial concept. A meeting with Richard Curtis provided the idea of a prequel/sequel which led to Ol Parker writing and directing Mamma Mia! Here We Go Again, reuniting the original cast of Meryl Streep, Pierce Brosnan, Colin Firth, Stellan Skarsgård, Julie Walters, Dominic Cooper, Amanda Seyfried and Christine Baranski to reprise their roles. They were joined by Lily James, Jessica Keenan Wynn, Alexa Davies, Hugh Skinner, Josh Dylan, Jeremy Irvine plus Andy García and Cher joined the Mamma Mia! family. Since opening in July 2018 the movie has become the most successful live musical movie sequel of all time grossing just less than $400 million.

Already Member of the Order of the British Empire (MBE), Craymer was appointed Commander of the Order of the British Empire (CBE) in the 2020 Birthday Honours for services to theatre and charity.

In May 2021, it was announced that Judy Craymer is to co-produce a biopic of Cher's life in partnership with Cher herself.

In September 2021, Judy was appointed Chairman of the Board and Independent Non-Executive Director of Universal Music Group. She retired from the Board in 2023.

In 2022 Craymer was honoured with the Variety Club Silver Heart Award for Outstanding Global Achievement in Cinema, Theatre and Music.

Craymer is co-executive producer of the entertainment show Mamma Mia! I Have a Dream, which aired on ITV1 and ITVX in October 2023.

== Publications ==
Craymer is the co-author, alongside Abba founder members Benny Andersson and Björn Ulvaeus, of Mamma Mia! How Can I Resist You, which looks in depth at the songs of Abba as well as the impact of the musical. The book was published by Weidenfeld & Nicolson in 2006. The paperback edition, released in 2008, also covers the success of Mamma Mia! The Movie.

== Other interests ==
In 2010 Craymer was awarded the "Breast Cancer Research Foundation Humanitarian award in memory of Sandra Taub", in recognition of her fund raising for Breast Cancer Research, having closely linked Mamma Mia! with the charity’s fundraising efforts.

Her early interest in competitive showjumping ("Horses were my obsession as a teenager and you never lose that love") led to her becoming an ambassador for the sport in 2011.

Since the end 2019, Judy has partnered with the UK charity Target Ovarian Cancer to help raise awareness and funds.

== Awards ==
- In 2002 Craymer was named as a Woman of the Year "for her foresight and determination in producing and staging the world wide musical hit Mamma Mia!".
- In 2005, she was placed eighth in the Real Business list of Top 50 women.
- In 2007 she came ninth in the Management Today list of Britain’s Top 100 Entrepreneurs. Also in 2007, Craymer was awarded an MBE in Queen's birthday honours list for services to the music industry.
- In 2008, Women in Film jointly awarded the ITV Achievement of the Year Award to Craymer, Catherine Johnson and Phyllida Lloyd.
- In 2009 she was nominated for the BAFTA Carl Foreman Award for Special Achievement.
