= Coombe Hill (Cotswolds) =

Protected area in Gloucestershire, England

- Site of Special Scientific Interest
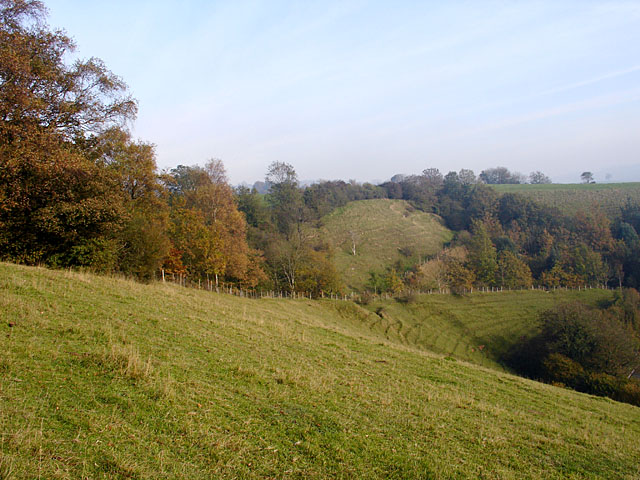
- Coombe Hill Lower slopes
- Location of Coombe Hill.
- Area of search: Gloucestershire
- Grid reference: ST765942
- Coordinates: 51.646101°N 2.341029°W
- Interest: Biological
- Area: 15.4 ha (38 acres)
- Notification date: 1994

Coombe Hill (grid reference ST765942) is a 15.4-hectare (38-acre) biological Site of Special Scientific Interest in Gloucestershire, notified in 1994.

The site lies within the Cotswold Area of Outstanding Natural Beauty and the Cotswold Hills Environmentally Sensitive Area. It is near Wotton-under-Edge. It is moderately steep, and mainly faces south.

== Flora ==
The hill is a large, unimproved limestone grassland pasture area, with an ungrazed area and an edge of broadleaved woodland (along the western boundary). This site is of special notification because of its large area of flower rich grassland. It is specifically a site for the nationally rare Limestone Woundwort (Stachy alpina). A nearby site (Wotton Hill SSSI) supports this rare plant also.

== SSSI Source ==
- Natural England SSSI information on the citation
- Natural England SSSI information on the Coombe Hill, Stroud units
