= Wotton-under-Edge Town Hall =

Municipal building in Wotton-under-Edge, Gloucestershire, England

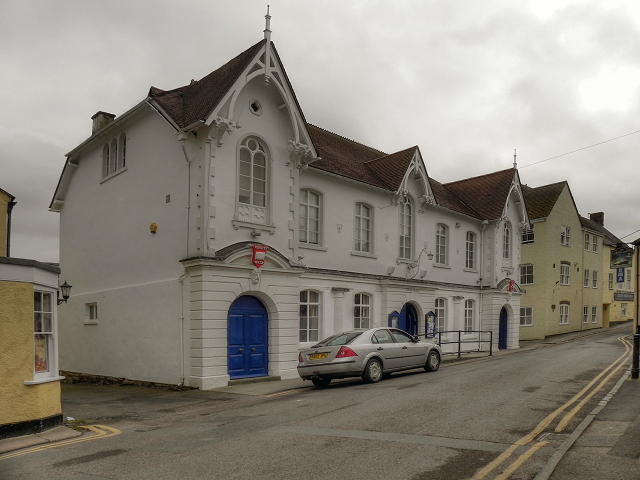
- Wotton-under-Edge Town Hall

- Shown in Gloucestershire
- 51.6371°N 2.3538°W
- Location: Market Street, Wotton-under-Edge

History
- Built: 1700

Site notes
- Architectural style: Gothic Revival style

Listed Building – Grade II
- Official name: Town Hall
- Designated: 23 June 1952
- Reference no.: 1341570

Wotton-under-Edge Town Hall is a municipal building in Market Street, Wotton-under-Edge, Gloucestershire, England. The structure, which operates as a community events venue, is a Grade II listed building.

== History ==
The building was commissioned as a market hall: the site chosen was an area known as Stony Chipping where regular markets were held. It was designed in the neoclassical style, built in stone and was completed in 1700. It was arcaded on the ground floor, so that markets could be held, with an assembly hall on the first floor. The assembly room was supported by fifteen Doric order columns laid out in three rows. The assembly hall was a popular venue for public meetings in the mid-19th century.

The arcading on the ground floor was infilled and the first floor refaced in the Gothic Revival style under the guidance of a restoration committee in 1872. Further enhancements were made in 1884. The new design involved a symmetrical main frontage of seven bays facing onto Market Street with the end bays projected forward as pavilions. The central bay featured a round headed doorway with voussoirs, set in a rusticated surround, with a tall round headed casement window with tracery on the first floor, and a gable above. The flanking bays contained segmental headed casement windows on both floors, separated on the ground floor by the original Doric order columns. The end bays also contained round headed doorways and were fenestrated in a similar style to the central bay but were surmounted by larger gables. Internally, the principal room was the main hall on the first floor.

The borough council, which had met in the main hall on the first floor, was abolished under the Municipal Corporations Act 1883. The Wotton-under-Edge Friendly Society continued to operate from offices in the building. The assets of the corporation, including the town hall, were transferred to the newly formed Wotton-under-Edge Town Trust in 1890. Rolls of honour to recognise local service personnel who had served in the First World War were installed in the building in 1920.

The ground floor was subsequently used for regular "Town Hall Teas", which raise money for local charities, while the first floor was used for larger events.
