= Mamma Mia! Here We Go Again =

2018 film by Ol Parker

- Theatrical release poster
- Directed by: Ol Parker
- Screenplay by: Ol Parker
- Story by: Richard Curtis; Ol Parker; Catherine Johnson
- Based on: Characters by Catherine Johnson
- Produced by: Judy Craymer; Gary Goetzman
- Starring: Christine Baranski; Pierce Brosnan; Dominic Cooper; Colin Firth; Andy García; Lily James; Amanda Seyfried; Stellan Skarsgård; Julie Walters; Cher; Meryl Streep
- Cinematography: Robert Yeoman
- Edited by: Peter Lambert
- Music by: Benny Andersson; Björn Ulvaeus; Anne Dudley
- Production companies: Playtone; Littlestar Productions; Legendary Pictures; Perfect World Pictures
- Distributed by: Universal Pictures
- Release dates: 16 July 2018 (Hammersmith Apollo); 20 July 2018 (United Kingdom and United States)
- Running time: 114 minutes
- Countries: United Kingdom; United States
- Language: English
- Budget: $75 million
- Box office: $482.4 million

Mamma Mia! Here We Go Again is a 2018 jukebox musical romantic comedy film written and directed by Ol Parker, from a story by Parker, Catherine Johnson, and Richard Curtis. It is the sequel and prequel to the 2008 film Mamma Mia!, which in turn is based on the 1999 eponymous musical using the music of ABBA. The film features an ensemble cast, including Christine Baranski, Pierce Brosnan, Dominic Cooper, Colin Firth, Andy García, Lily James, Amanda Seyfried, Stellan Skarsgård, Julie Walters, Cher, Meryl Streep, Alexa Davies, Jessica Keenan Wynn, Josh Dylan, Jeremy Irvine, and Hugh Skinner. Both a prequel and a sequel, the plot is set after the events of the previous film, and is intersected with flashbacks to Donna's youth in 1979, with some scenes from the two time periods mirroring each other.

Due to the financial success of the first film, Universal Pictures had long been interested in a sequel. The film was officially announced in May 2017, with Parker hired to write and direct. In June 2017, many of the original cast confirmed their involvement, with James being cast in the role of Young Donna that July. Filming took place from August to December 2017 in Croatia (most prominently Vis), Bordeaux, Stockholm, Oxford, Hampton and at Shepperton Studios. A British and American joint venture, the film was co-produced by Playtone, Littlestar Productions, Perfect World Pictures, and Legendary Entertainment.

Mamma Mia! Here We Go Again was premiered at the Hammersmith Apollo in London on 16 July 2018, and was released in the United Kingdom and the United States on 20 July 2018, ten years to the week after its predecessor's release, in both standard and IMAX formats. The film received generally positive reviews; critics considered it an improvement over its predecessor and praised the performances and musical numbers. It was a box office success, grossing $482 million worldwide.

== Plot ==
In 1979, a young Donna Sheridan graduates from Oxford's New College with her best friends, Rosie and Tanya, and dreams of the Greek island Kalokairi. Her mother, Ruby, is a famous singer and is always away on tour so she does not attend Donna's graduation. Fed up with her mother's constant absence and determined to spend her life making memories, Donna travels to Kalokairi to find her destiny.

Years later, (Note: The events are set five years after Mamma Mia! (2008).) Donna's daughter, Sophie, is in Kalokairi preparing the grand reopening of the Hotel Bella Donna in honour of her recently deceased mother. Harry and Bill cannot attend due to overseas obligations and Sophie also feels estranged from her husband, Sky, who has been offered a job in New York City.

In Paris, Donna meets a man named Harry Bright. They have sex before Donna leaves for Greece. When she misses her boat to Kalokairi, Bill Anderson gives her a lift in his sailboat, where they dance and flirt. En route, they help stranded fisherman Alexio to return to shore in time to save the love of his life from marrying someone else. Unbeknownst to Donna, Harry has followed her to Greece, however he arrives too late and she sails off with Bill.

In the present, Rosie and Tanya arrive and Sophie shows them the renovated hotel. This mirrors the past, when Donna explores the abandoned farmhouse that would eventually become the hotel. A storm then breaks out and Donna discovers a trapped horse, and soothes it with the assistance of Sam Carmichael. In the present, a storm destroys both the decorations and cuts off ferries to Kalokairi, to Sophie's dismay.

Sam, who lives in a cabin on the island, reassures Sophie that she can never disappoint her mother, as he once did. Before Sophie was born, Donna and Sam were enjoying a whirlwind romance which ended badly when she discovered he was engaged. Heartbroken, Donna breaks up with Sam and tearfully watches him leave the island, while the present Sam reassures Sophie how important she was to her.

Following Sam's departure, Donna is visited by Tanya and Rosie, who cheer her up by performing as Donna and the Dynamos. Bill returns to the island, and she joins him on his boat, much to the chagrin of Rosie, who fell for Bill. While they are gone, Sam returns, having ended his engagement for Donna, but is saddened to hear she is with another.

Donna discovers she is pregnant but has no idea which one of her three recent lovers is the father. Bill's great-aunt Sofia overhears Donna's wish to stay on the island and reveals she owns the abandoned farmhouse where she has been staying. Donna happily accepts her offer to stay there, where she later gives birth to Sophie.

In the present, Sophie tells Rosie and Tanya about her problems with Sky, and Rosie explains how she and Bill broke up. Meanwhile, Bill, Harry, and Sky leave their ventures abroad to support Sophie but are told there are no boats to Kalokairi. However, Alexio recognises Bill so he offers the trio safe boat passage to the island as gratitude for Bill saving his relationship. Bill convinces everyone to join them for the Kalokairi party. When the guests arrive, Bill and Rosie reunite over their mutual grief over Donna's death, and Sophie tells Sky she is pregnant and never felt closer to her mother.

The celebration is disrupted when Ruby arrives, despite not being invited. Ruby explains that Sky tracked her down, and she wants to build a relationship with her granddaughter. Sophie then performs with the Dynamos in honour of Donna. Ruby is proud, and expresses slight but sincere grief over her daughter's death. Afterwards, the hotel manager, Señor Fernando Cienfuegos, reveals that he is Ruby's long-lost lover from 1959, so they are joyously reunited.

Months later, Sophie gives birth to her baby boy, Donny. At the christening, Donna's ghost proudly watches, and they have a final moment before Donna fully passes on.

== Cast ==
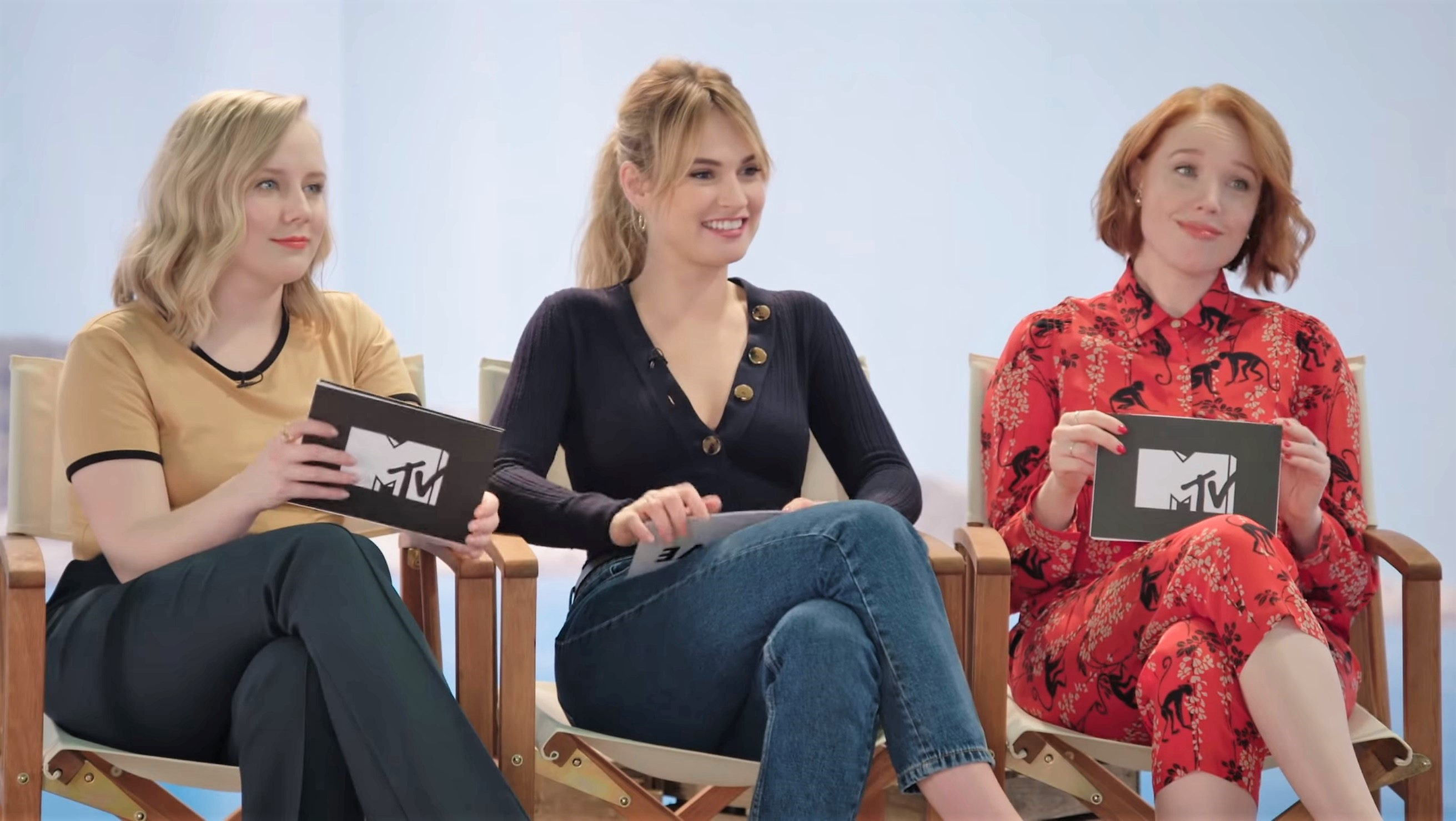
Left to right: Alexa Davies, Lily James, Jessica Keenan Wynn, on MTV International in 2018

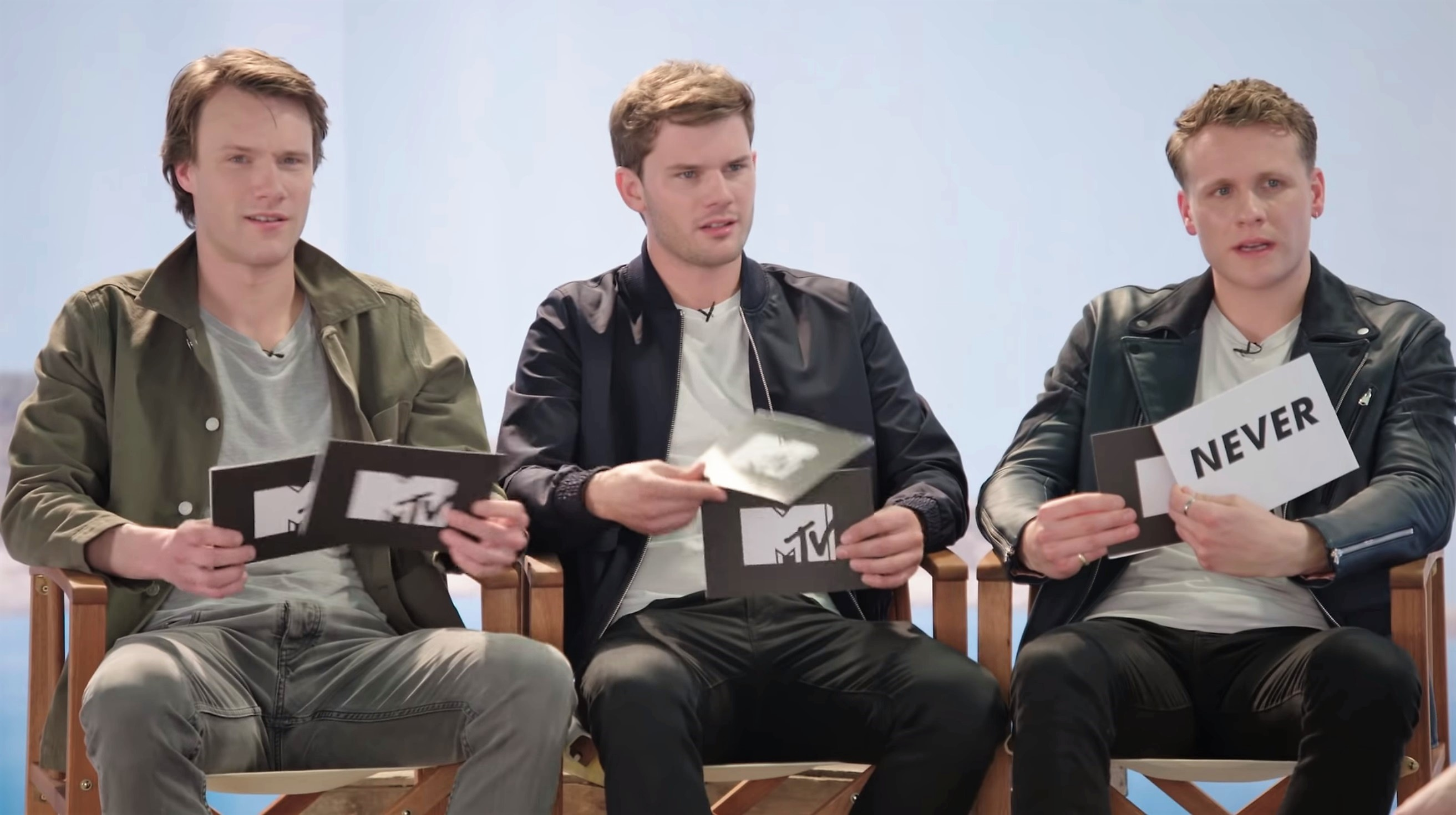
Left to right: Hugh Skinner, Jeremy Irvine, Josh Dylan, on MTV International in 2018

- Christine Baranski as Tanya Chesham-Leigh
  - Jessica Keenan Wynn as young Tanya
- Pierce Brosnan as Sam Carmichael
  - Jeremy Irvine as young Sam
- Dominic Cooper as Sky Rymand, Sophie's husband
- Colin Firth as Harry Bright
  - Hugh Skinner as young Harry
- Andy García as Señor Fernando Cienfuegos, the Mexican manager of the Hotel Bella Donna, who had an affair with Ruby in 1959
- Meryl Streep as Donna Sheridan-Carmichael
  - Lily James as young Donna
- Amanda Seyfried as Sophie Sheridan
- Stellan Skarsgård as Bill Anderson
  - Skarsgård also plays Kurt Anderson, Bill's obese twin brother.
  - Josh Dylan as young Bill
- Julie Walters as Rosie Mulligan
  - Alexa Davies as young Rosie
- Cher as Ruby Sheridan, Donna's mother
- Maria Vacratsis as Sofia, Bill's great-aunt
- Celia Imrie as the Vice-Chancellor of the University of Oxford, where Donna, Rosie, and Tanya studied
- Omid Djalili as a Greek customs officer
- Gerard Monaco as Alexio
- Panos Mouzourakis as Lazaros, Sofia's son and Bill's cousin once removed
- Naoko Mori as Yumiko
- Togo Igawa as Mr. Tatyama
- Anastasia Hille as Dr. Inge Horvath
- Jonathan Goldsmith as Don Rafael Cienfuegos, Fernando Cienfuegos's brother
- Björn Ulvaeus as a university professor (uncredited)
- Benny Andersson as the pianist in the Parisian restaurant during "Waterloo" (uncredited)

== Musical numbers ==
A soundtrack album was released on 13 July 2018, by Capitol and Polydor Records in the United States and internationally, respectively. The album was produced by Benny Andersson, who also served as the album's executive producer alongside Björn Ulvaeus and Judy Craymer. Each song is featured within the film, with the exception of "I Wonder (Departure)" and "The Day Before You Came".

1. "When I Kissed the Teacher" – Young Donna and the Dynamos, Vice-Chancellor
2. "I Wonder (Departure)" – Young Donna and the Dynamos^{†}
3. "One of Us" – Sophie and Sky
4. "Waterloo" – Young Harry and Young Donna
5. "Why Did It Have to Be Me?" – Young Bill, Young Donna and Young Harry
6. "I Have a Dream" – Young Donna
7. "Kisses of Fire" – Lazaros
8. "Andante, Andante" – Young Donna
9. "The Name of the Game" – Young Donna
10. "Knowing Me, Knowing You" – Young Donna and Young Sam, Sam and Sophie
11. "Mamma Mia" – Young Donna and the Dynamos
12. "Angel Eyes" – Rosie, Tanya, and Sophie
13. "Dancing Queen" – Sophie, Rosie, Tanya, Sam, Bill, and Harry
14. "I've Been Waiting for You" – Sophie, Rosie, and Tanya
15. "Fernando" – Ruby, Fernando
16. "My Love, My Life" – Young Donna, Donna, Sophie
17. "Super Trouper" – Ruby, Donna, Rosie, Tanya, Sophie, Sky, Sam, Bill, Harry, Fernando, Young Donna, Young Rosie, Young Tanya, Young Bill, Young Sam, and Young Harry
18. "The Day Before You Came" – Donna^{†}
- ^{†} Songs featured on the soundtrack album but omitted from the film.

Additionally, short and instrumental versions of other ABBA songs were included in the film, but omitted from the soundtrack. In chronological order:

1. "Thank You for the Music" – Sophie
2. "Our Last Summer" – Instrumental
3. "I Let the Music Speak" – Instrumental
4. "SOS" – Sam
5. "Take a Chance on Me" – Instrumental
6. "Under Attack" – Instrumental
7. "Hasta Mañana" – Helen Sjöholm (radio/voiceover)
8. "Hole in Your Soul" – Lazaros
9. "Money, Money, Money" – Lazaros
10. "Slipping Through My Fingers" – Instrumental
11. "Chiquitita" – Instrumental

== Production ==
=== Development ===
Mamma Mia! Here We Go Again was announced on 19 May 2017, with a release date of 20 July 2018. It was written and directed by Ol Parker. On 27 September 2017, Benny Andersson confirmed 3 ABBA songs that would be featured in the film: "When I Kissed the Teacher", "I Wonder (Departure)", and "Angeleyes". "I Wonder (Departure)" was cut from the film, but is included on the soundtrack album.

=== Casting ===
On 1 June 2017, it was announced that Seyfried would return as Sophie. Later that month, Dominic Cooper confirmed that he would return for the sequel, along with Streep, Firth and Brosnan as Sky, Donna, Harry, and Sam, respectively. In July 2017, Baranski was also confirmed to return as Tanya. On 12 July 2017, Lily James was cast to play the role of young Donna. On 3 August 2017, Jeremy Irvine and Alexa Davies were also cast in the film, with Irvine playing Brosnan's character Sam in a past era, and Hugh Skinner to play Young Harry, Davies as a young Rosie, played by Julie Walters. On 16 August 2017, it was announced that Jessica Keenan Wynn had been cast as a young Tanya, who is played by Baranski. Julie Walters and Stellan Skarsgård also reprised their roles as Rosie and Bill, respectively. On 16 October 2017, it was announced that singer and actress Cher had joined the cast, in her first on-screen film role since 2010. The part was written specifically for Cher, and she got to choose Andy García as her romantic partner.

=== Filming ===
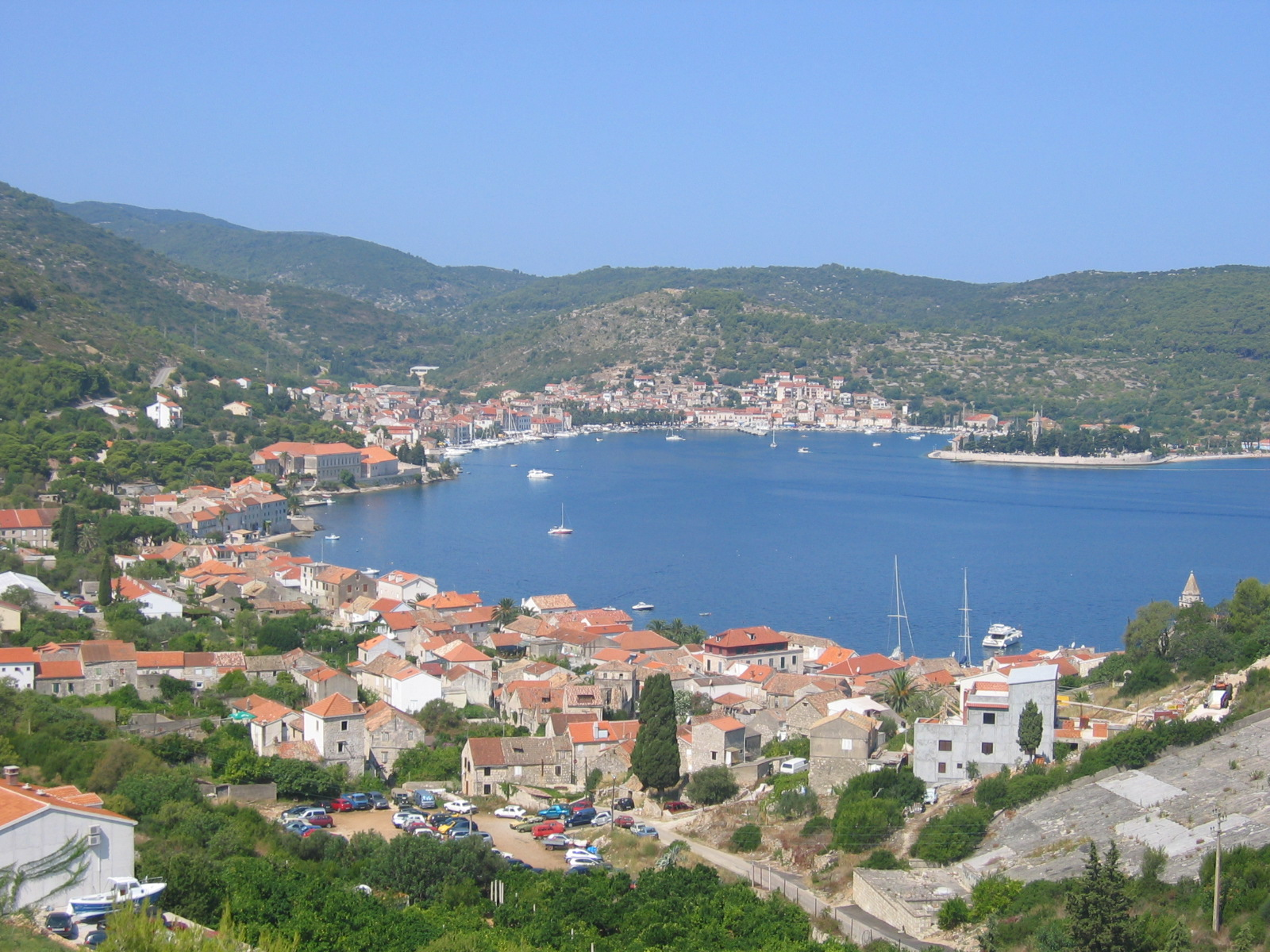
The film was filmed on the Croatian island of Vis

Principal photography on the film began on 12 August 2017, in Croatia, including the island of Vis. In October 2017, the cast gathered at Shepperton Studios in Surrey, England, to film song and dance numbers with Cher. Filming wrapped on 2 December 2017.

== Release ==
Mamma Mia! Here We Go Again was released on 20 July 2018, by Universal Pictures, in the United Kingdom, United States and other selected countries in both standard and IMAX formats. The film premiered on 16 July 2018, at the Hammersmith Apollo in London. The film is dedicated to the memory of production designer Alan MacDonald.

=== Marketing ===
The first trailer for the film was released on 21 December 2017, in front of Pitch Perfect 3, another Universal Pictures film. Cher performed "Fernando" at the Las Vegas CinemaCon on 25 April 2018, after footage of the film was shown. Universal sponsored YouTube stars the Merrell Twins to perform a cover version of the song "Mamma Mia" to promote the film.

== Home media ==
Mamma Mia! Here We Go Again was released via digital copy on 9 October 2018, and released on DVD, Blu-ray, and 4K UHD Combo Pack on 23 October 2018. The film debuted at the top of the NPD VideoScan First Alert chart for the week ending on 27 October 2018. It retained the top spot on the chart for the week ending on 3 November 2018.

== Reception ==
=== Box office ===
Mamma Mia! Here We Go Again grossed $120.6 million in the United States and Canada, and $281.6 million in other territories, for a total worldwide gross of $482.3 million, against a production budget of $75 million.

In June 2018, three weeks prior to its release, official industry tracking had the film debuting to $27–33 million, which increased to as much as $36 million by the week of its release. It made $14.3 million on its first day, including $3.4 million from Thursday night previews. It went on to debut to $35 million, finishing second, behind fellow newcomer The Equalizer 2 ($36 million), and besting the opening of the first film ($27.8 million) by over 24%. It fell 57% to $15.1 million in its second weekend, finishing second behind newcomer Mission: Impossible – Fallout. In its third weekend the film grossed $9 million, dropping to fourth place, and $5.8 million in its fourth weekend, finishing seventh.

In the United Kingdom, the film grossed $12.7 million in its opening weekend, topping the box office and achieving the fourth biggest opening for a film in 2018. In its second weekend of international release, the film made $26.6 million (for a running total of $98.6 million). Its largest new markets were France ($1.7 million), Poland ($1.3 million), Switzerland ($223,000) and Croatia ($151,000), while its best holdovers were Australia ($9.5 million), the UK ($8.6 million) and Germany ($8.2 million). In the United Kingdom, the film was the second highest-grossing film of 2018, following Avengers: Infinity War.

=== Critical response ===
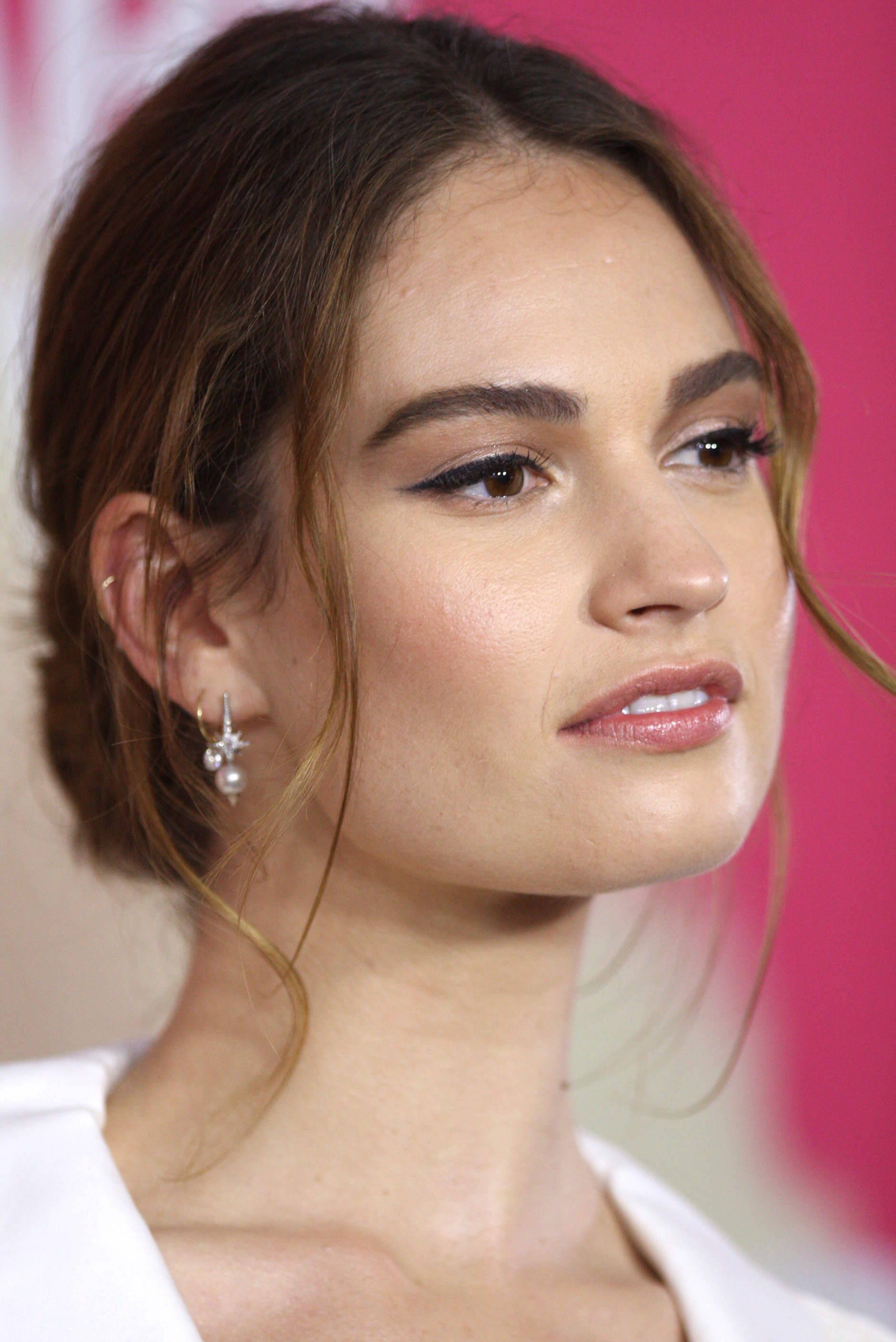
Lily James' performance as Young Donna was praised by critics as a "breakout" role.

On review aggregator website Rotten Tomatoes, the film holds an approval rating of 80% based on 274 reviews, with an average of 6.3/10. The website's critics consensus reads, "Mamma Mia! Here We Go Again doubles down on just about everything fans loved about the original—and my my, how can fans resist it?" On Metacritic the film has a weighted average score of 60 out of 100 based on 46 critics, indicating "mixed or average reviews". Audiences polled by CinemaScore gave the film an average grade of "A−" on an A+ to F scale, the same score as its predecessor, while PostTrak reported filmgoers gave it an 83% overall positive score.

Peter Bradshaw of The Guardian termed the sequel as "weirdly irresistible" and gave it three out of five stars. He described his reaction to the first film as "a combination of hives and bubonic plague", but concedes that this time, the relentlessness and greater self-aware comedy made him smile. He concludes: "More enjoyable than I thought. But please. Enough now." Mark Kermode of The Observer gave the film five stars and commented, "This slick sequel delivers sharp one-liners, joyously contrived plot twists and an emotional punch that left our critic reeling."

Peter Travers of Rolling Stone awarded the film two and a half stars out of five, noting the absence of Streep for the majority of the film hindered his enjoyment, and saying, "her absence is deeply felt since the three-time Oscar winner sang and danced her heart out as Donna Sheridan". Lindsay Bahr of Associated Press awarded the film three out of four stars, calling it "wholly ridiculous", but complimenting its self-awareness. She also praised James' performance and singing talent. Richard Roeper of the Chicago Sun-Times gave the sequel a mixed review, awarding it two stars out of four, criticising the reprises of "Dancing Queen" and "Super Trouper" as uninspired, and feeling that some of the musical numbers dragged the pacing. He considered the younger counterparts to the main characters "energetic" and "likeable". Stephanie Zacharek of Time gave the film a mixed review, writing "Mamma Mia! Here We Go Again is atrocious. And wonderful. It's all the reasons you should never go to the movies. And all the reasons you should race to get a ticket."

=== Accolades ===
Award	Date of ceremony	Category	Nominee(s)	Result	Ref.
Costume Designers Guild Awards	19 February 2019	Excellence in Contemporary Film	Michele Clapton	Nominated	
European Film Awards	2019	People's Choice Award for Best European Film	Mamma Mia! Here We Go Again	Nominated	
Hollywood Music in Media Awards	2019	Best Soundtrack Album	"Mamma Mia! Here We Go Again: the Soundtrack"	Nominated	
Hollywood Music in Media Awards	2019	Outstanding Music Supervision – Film	Becky Bentham	Nominated	
People's Choice Awards	11 November 2018	The Comedy Movie of 2018	Mamma Mia! Here We Go Again	Nominated	
People's Choice Awards	11 November 2018	Female Movie Star	Lily James	Nominated	
People's Choice Awards	11 November 2018	Comedy Movie Star	Amanda Seyfried	Nominated	
Online Film & Television Association	2019	Best Adapted Song	"Fernando", performed by Cher	Nominated	

== Sequel ==
In June 2020, Judy Craymer announced that a third film was in development, with the producer confirming that some of the new ABBA songs written for the band's reunion could feature in the soundtrack, although stating that the COVID-19 pandemic had caused delays with development of the project. After months of postponement, ABBA released their new album Voyage in November 2021.

In an interview with BBC Two's Newsnight in May 2023, Andersson expressed his scepticism about the prospect of a sequel, describing it as "wishful thinking" and saying he would not like to see a sequel made unless there were substantial changes. In October 2023, Craymer reaffirmed that a third film "will happen".
