= Charles Blagden =

English physician and scientist

Charles Brian Blagden
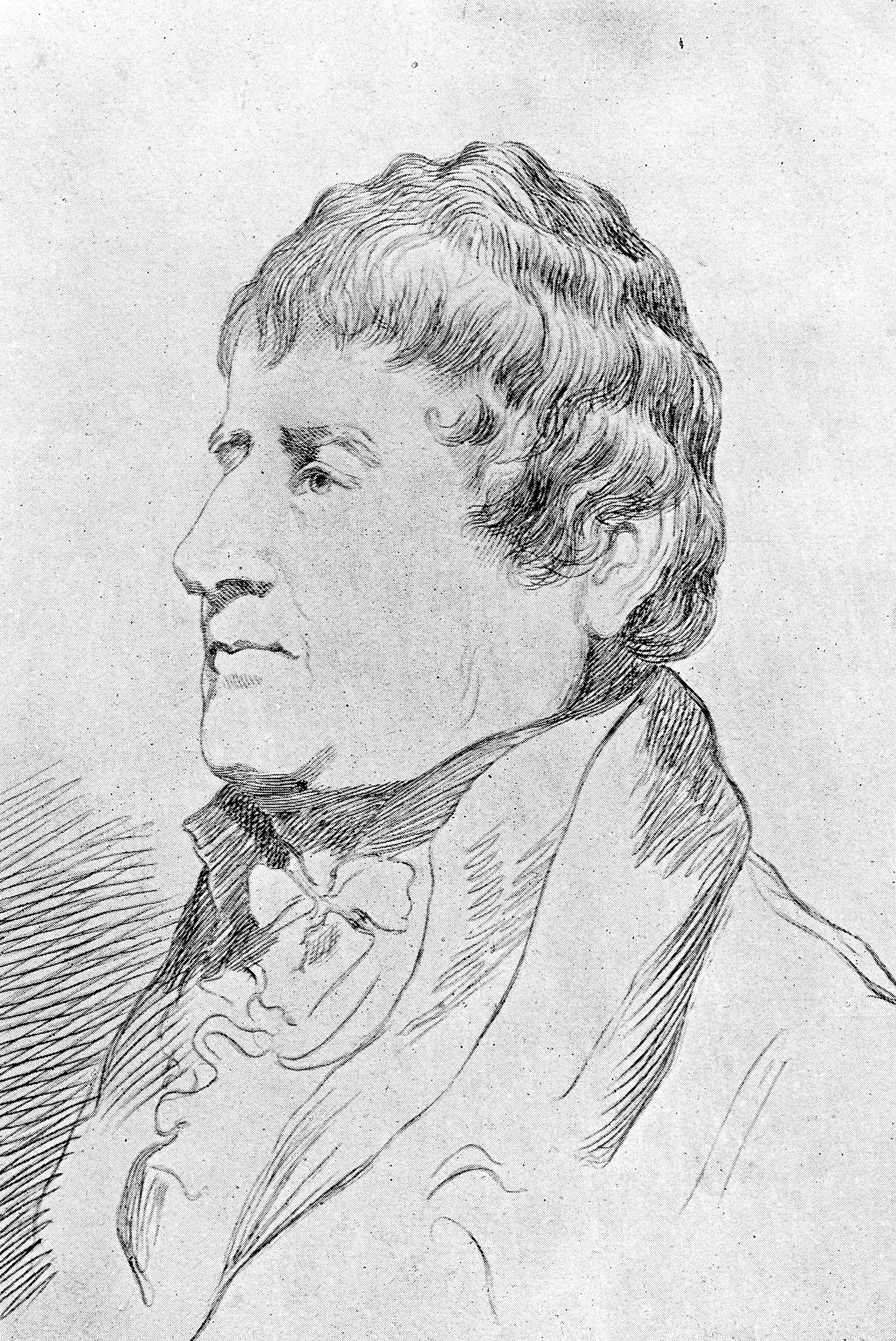
- Portrait by Mary Dawson Turner
- Born: 17 April 1748; Wotton-under-Edge, Gloucestershire
- Died: 26 March 1820 (aged 71); Arcueil, France
- Known for: Studies of perspiration and the freezing point of solutions
- Awards: Copley Medal (1788)

Sir Charles Brian Blagden FRS (17 April 1748 – 26 March 1820) was an English physician and chemist. He served as a medical officer in the Army (1776–1780) and later held the position of Secretary of the Royal Society (1784–1797). Blagden won the Copley Medal in 1788 and was knighted in 1792.

He died in Arcueil, France in 1820, and was buried at Père Lachaise Cemetery in Paris.

== Early life ==
Blagden was born in Wooten-under-Edge in Gloucestershire. He was a younger son of John Blagden (1715–1750) and Elizabeth Phelps (1716–1784). His family was part of the local textile industry. Of his youth, he stated that he "was denied the advantages of either public school or college education". Nonetheless, he studied medicine at the University of Edinburgh and graduated as a doctor in 1768. He was elected a fellow of the Royal Society in 1772. In 1776, he became an army surgeon. During the American War of Independence, he served on the hospital ship HMS Pigot. In 1780, he returned to a medical post in Plymouth but in late 1782 or early 1783 left for London to become an assistant and amanuensis to Henry Cavendish.

== Science ==
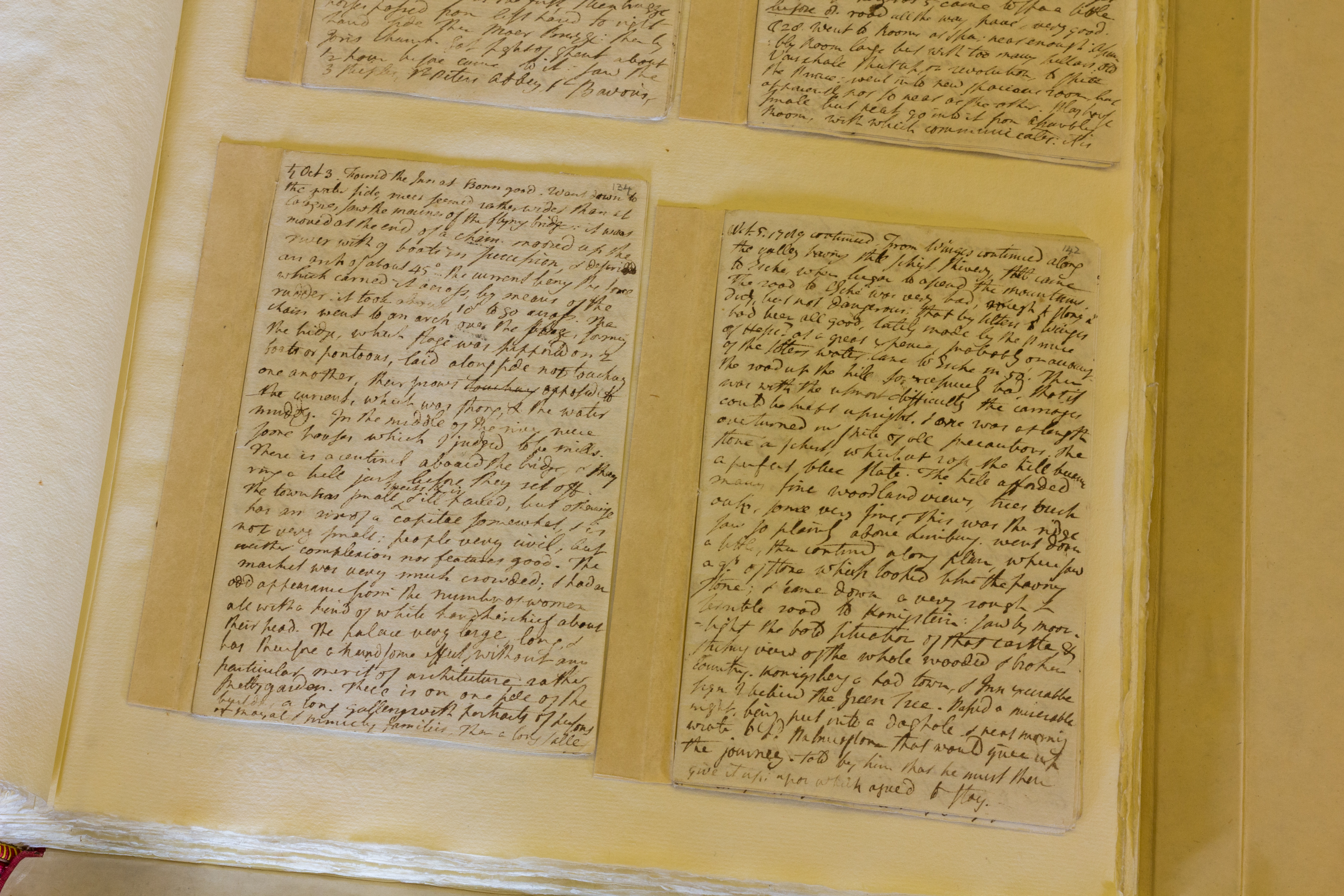
Blagden collection at the Royal Society

In June 1783, Blagden, then assistant to Henry Cavendish, visited Antoine Lavoisier in Paris and described how Cavendish had created water by burning "inflammable air". Lavoisier's dissatisfaction with the Cavendish's "dephlogistinization" theory led him to the concept of a chemical reaction, which he reported to the Royal Academy on 24 June 1783, effectively founding modern chemistry. He was elected a Foreign Honorary Member of the American Academy of Arts and Sciences in 1789. He was elected to the American Philosophical Society in 1789.

Blagden experimented on human ability to withstand high temperatures. In 1775 he showed that human beings could withstand room temperatures as high as 260 degrees Fahrenheit (127 degrees Celsius). In his report to the Royal Society in 1775, he was first Western scientist to officially recognise the role of perspiration in thermoregulation.

Blagden's experiments on how dissolved substances like salt affected the freezing point of water led to the discovery that the freezing point of a solution decreases in direct proportion to the concentration of the solution, now called Blagden's Law.
