= Catherine Johnson (playwright) =

British playwright

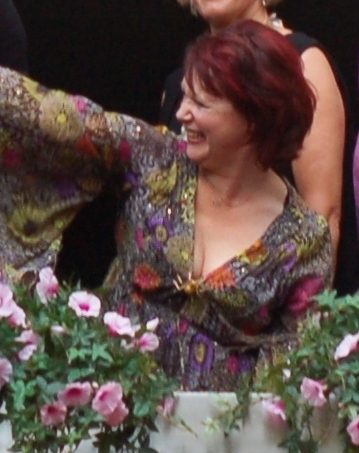
- Born: 14 October 1957 (age 69); Suffolk, England, UK
- Occupations: Playwright, screenwriter
- Writing career
- Notable work: Mamma Mia!
- Notable awards: Bristol Old Vic/HTV Playwriting award Thames Television Best Play award UK Film Council script award

Catherine Johnson (born 14 October 1957) is a British playwright, producing works for stage and television. She is best known for writing the ABBA-inspired musical Mamma Mia! and screenplay for the musical's film adaptation. The film became the highest-grossing British picture of all time in the UK to that point, and the biggest selling UK DVD of all time in January 2009. She also co-wrote the 2018 sequel, Mamma Mia! Here We Go Again.

Johnson grew up in Wickwar near Wotton-under-Edge in Gloucestershire, and attended Katharine Lady Berkeley's School in Wotton. She was expelled from school at 16, married at 18 and divorced by the age of 24. She moved to Bristol and finding herself unemployed and with one child to support and another on the way she spotted a notice in the local paper for the Bristol Old Vic/HTV West playwriting competition. She wrote Rag Doll, using the pseudonym Maxwell Smart, a play about incest and child abuse, which won the competition and was staged by the Bristol Old Vic. Further plays for the Bush Theatre in London, Bristol Old Vic and Show of Strength followed along with work on television series including Casualty, Love Hurts and Byker Grove.

In 2007 Johnson instituted The Catherine Johnson Award for Best Play written by the five Pearson Playwrights' Scheme bursary winners from the previous year. Catherine won a bursary from the scheme in 1991. Catherine is a patron of the Wotton Electric Picture House in Wotton-under-Edge, Bristol's Myrtle Theatre Company and Arts and Community in Thornbury.

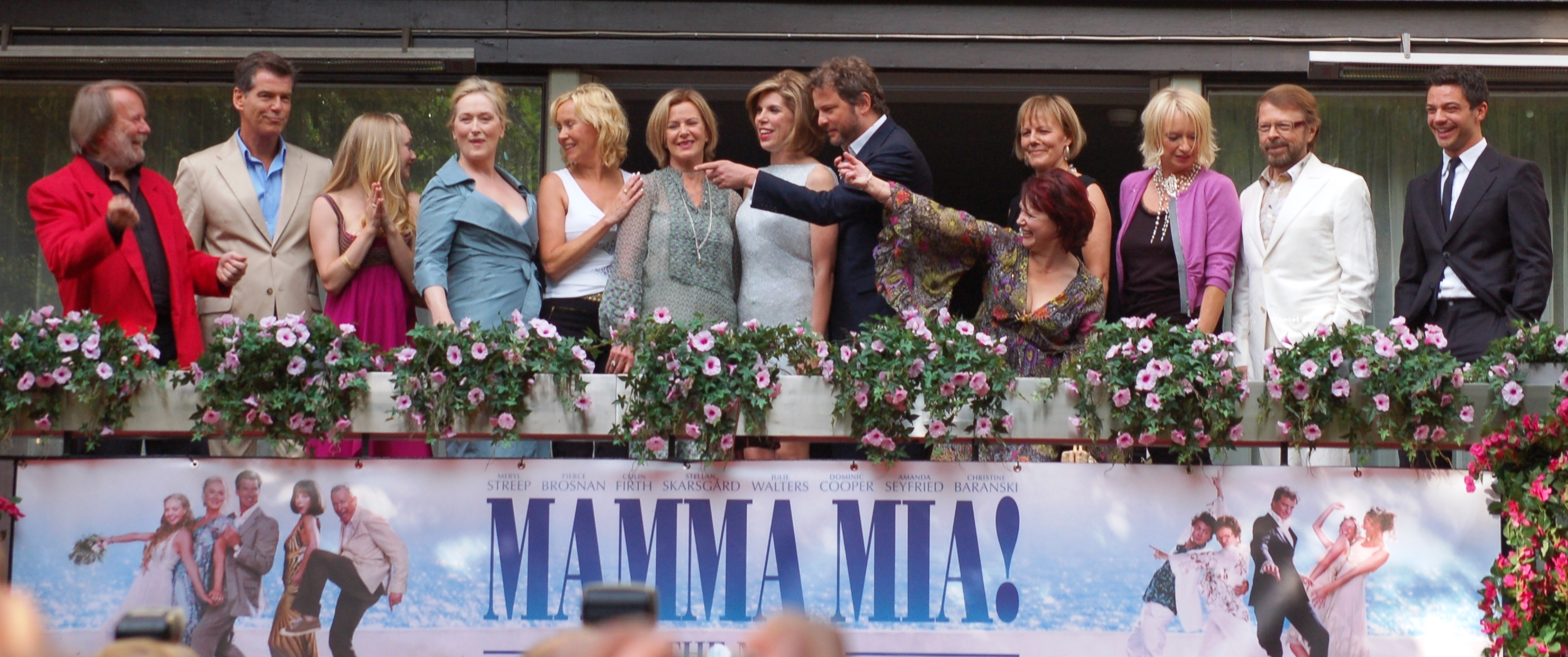
Johnson (5th from right) with the cast of Mamma Mia! and ABBA members

== Credits ==
=== Stage ===
- Rag Doll (Bristol Old Vic Studio) (Winner BOV/HTV Playwriting Award) 1988
- Boys Mean Business (Bush Theatre) 1989
- Dead Sheep (Bush Theatre) (Co-winner Thames TV Best Play Award) 1991
- Too Much Too Young (Bristol Old Vic and London Bubble) 1992
- Where's Willy? (Bristol Old Vic) 1994
- Renegades (Bristol Old Vic) 1995
- Shang-a-Lang (Bush Theatre & tour) 1998
- Mamma Mia! (LittleStar) 1999
- Little Baby Nothing (Bush Theatre) 2003
- Through The Wire (Shell Connections, RNT) 2005
- Through The Wire (new version) (Myrtle Theatre, Bristol 2006)
- City of One (Myrtle Theatre, Bristol 2008)
- Trade It? (Show of Strength), Bristol 2008, contributor
- Suspension (Bristol Old Vic) 2009

=== Television series ===
- Casualty (Season 7, 1992, episodes 5 & 13) BBC
- Love Hurts (Season 2, episodes 5 & 7; Season 3 episodes 1, 2, 3, & 10) BBC
- Band of Gold (Series 3, episodes 5 & 6) Granada TV
- Byker Grove (Series 9) BBC
- Love in the 21st Century (episodes 2, 3 & 5) Channel 4
- Linda Green (episode 3) BBC

=== Television films ===
- Rag Doll (HTV)
- Just Like Eddie (HTV)
- Where's Willy? (HTV)
- Sin Bin (BBC)
- Forget You Ever Had Children (Picture Palace/ITV) in production
- Dappers (pilot – in production) BBC

=== Feature films ===
Mamma Mia! (film series)

- Mamma Mia! The Movie – screenplay
- Mamma Mia! Here We Go Again – story

== Awards ==
Her career accolades to date include the Bristol Old Vic/HTV Playwriting award (1987), and the Thames Television Writer-in-Residence and Best Play awards (1991) Mamma Mia! was also nominated for an Olivier Award for Best New Musical (2000) and for a Tony Award for Best Book of a Musical Book (2002). Catherine received The UK Film Council script award at The Women in Film and TV 2008 Awards and also jointly with Judy Craymer and Phyllida Lloyd, The ITV achievement of the year award. Mamma Mia! was named Best Musical at the UK National Film Awards in September 2008, and was nominated for the Golden Globe Award for Best Motion Picture – Musical or Comedy in December 2008. In January 2009, Mamma Mia! was nominated for the Outstanding British Film award at the BAFTA 62nd British Academy Film Awards.

== See also ==
- Mamma Mia! (musical)
- Mamma Mia!
