= Wotton Electric Picture House =

Historical local town cinema

- Wotton Cinema
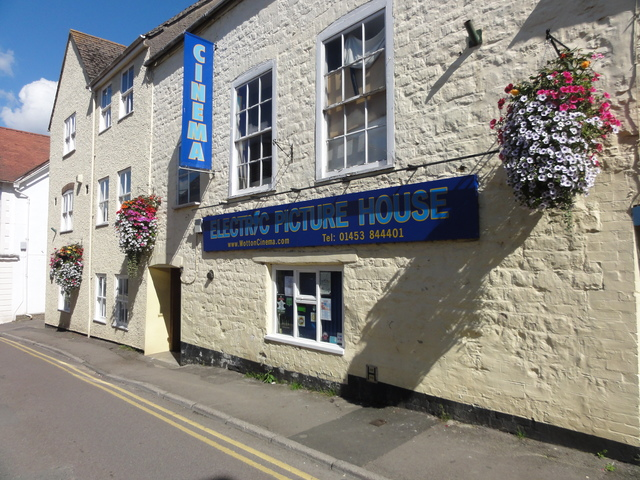
- Interactive map of Wotton Electric Picture House
- Former names: The Town Cinema (1993–2002)
- Address: 18A Market Street, Wotton-under-Edge; Gloucestershire; England
- Coordinates: 51.636944°N 2.353889°W
- Owner: The Electric Picture House Cinema Ltd (since 2014)
- Capacity: 100
- Current use: Cinema

Construction
- Opened: 1913
- Years active: 1913 - 1960; 1963 - 1965; 1993 - 2002; 2005 - Present

Website
- www.wottoncinema.com

Wotton Electric Picture House (also known as Wotton Cinema and previously The Town Cinema) is a cinema in Wotton-under-Edge, Gloucestershire, England. The cinema hosts one screen, with a laser projector.

Originally opening in 1913, it has been under the management of The Electric Picture House Cinema Ltd. since 2014. The cinema is one of the oldest in the country, and, in 2007, became one of the first in the country to use digital projection.

== History ==
=== 1910s to 1920s ===
In 1911, Mr. and Mrs. William Coe purchased the Crown Inn, on Market Street, which had been de-licensed.

In 1913, an upstairs room previously operating as a Banqueting Room for the Crown Inn, was opened as the Electric Picture House to show silent films, becoming a popular attraction. By 1920, there were too few seats to meet the demand of the local area.

Opening in 1921, a new auditorium was constructed following the demolishing of old stables, seating 220 people.

=== 1930s to 1965 ===
In 1930, sound equipment was installed in the cinema, allowing for sound-films to be shown for the first time at the venue, increasing popularity, as nearby cinemas, notably those in Thornbury and Dursley, had not yet upgraded.

During the Second World War, the cinema remained open, showing both black and white and colour films, the latter requiring more power to run the equipment, resulting in gas being used alongside the cinema's generator, causing Market Street's streetlights to dim during the showing of a colour film. The cinema remained popular following the end of the war.

In 1947, Mr. and Mrs. Coe sold the cinema to Mr. C. M. Jenner, a retired farmer, who continued to run it with his daughter and son-in-law for over a decade.

In 1960, following a decrease in ticket sales due to the increasing popularity of television, Mr. Jenner closed the cinema.

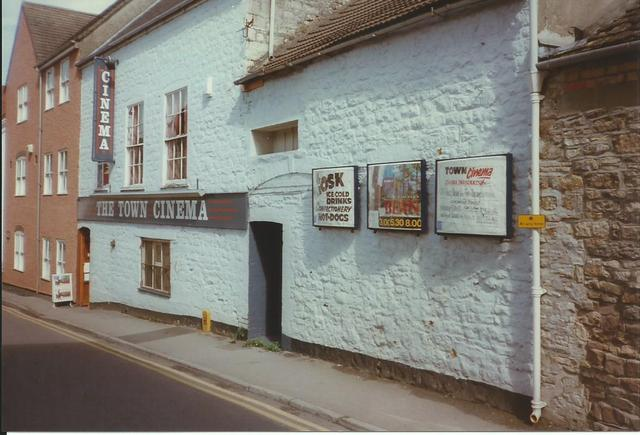
The cinema pictured in August 1997, under the name of The Town Cinema.

In 1963, the cinema re-opened under the ownership of the cinema's pre-closure projectionist, Michael Chappell and fellow projectionist, Adrian Wicks. The cinema remained open for around 18 months before closing again, in 1965.

=== 1965 to 2002 ===
Following its closure, the cinema was purchased by Synwell Boxing Club, the auditorium re-purposed for Bingo. The boxing club continue to occupy the upstairs space today.

In 1993, the cinema once again re-opened under the ownership of Andy Coudry and Jess Elton, under the name of the Town Cinema. After nine years of operating, the cinema closed again in 2002.

=== 2005 to 2020s ===
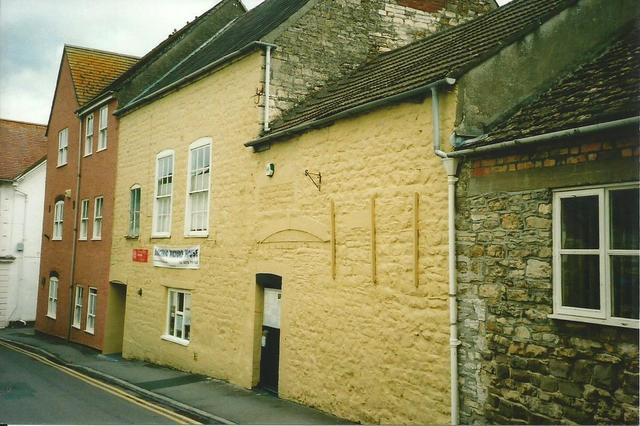
The cinema pictured in 2006, having recently re-opened a year before.

Local residents, wishing to keep the cinema open, began fundraising, searching for sponsors and obtaining permissions to re-open the cinema. Two years after its closure, in November 2005, the cinema opened again, under the name of the Electric Picture House and with 100 seats, run by Jeff and Janet Walshe, who had also overseen the reconstruction of the auditorium, as well as a number of volunteers.

In 2007, the cinema became one of the first in the country to begin using digital projection, and in 2013 installed satellite equipment to show live theatre productions.

In late 2013, following decreasing ticket sales and the retirement of Jeff and Janet Walshe, Gareth Negus and Samantha Osborn took over operations as a commercial operator, following almost a decade of an entirely volunteer team. This had been the plan for the cinema since its reopening.

By 2014, Negus and Osborn had increased the number of screenings and begun utilising paid staff as well as volunteers.

In 2015, management passed over to Negus and Osborn's own company, The Electric Picture House Cinema Ltd.

The cinema closed during the COVID-19 pandemic in the United Kingdom, reopening later in 2020 with reduced seating, before returning to standard seating.

As of January 2026, Negus and Osborn still operate the cinema under their company, screening at least one film a day, in the evening, with occasional matinee screenings.

== Notable Patrons ==
- Catherine Johnson, Playwright (born 1957)
