= Wotton Hill =

Hill in Gloucestershire, England

- Site of Special Scientific Interest
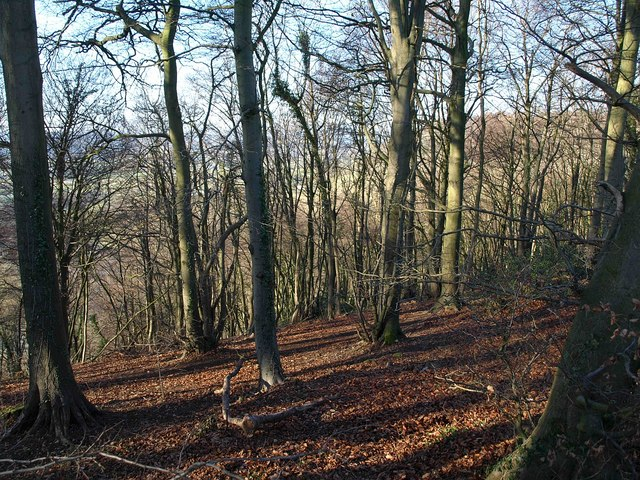
- Westridge Wood (looking down scarp slope from the Cotswold Way)

- Location within Gloucestershire
- Location of Wotton Hill.
- Area of search: Gloucestershire
- Grid reference: ST753942
- Coordinates: 51.6465°N 2.35765°W
- Interest: Biological/Geological
- Area: 26.1 ha (64 acres)
- Notification date: 1954

Wotton Hill (grid reference ST753942) is a hill on the edge of the Cotswold Hills in Gloucestershire, England, 0.5 miles (0.80 km) north of Wotton-under-Edge. The Cotswold Way passes over the hill.

The escarpment forms a 26.1-hectare (64-acre) biological and geological Site of Special Scientific Interest in Gloucestershire, notified in 1954 and ratified in 1986.

The site is in the Cotswolds Area of Outstanding Natural Beauty and is divided into 5 units of assessment. The site is owned by the National Trust and the Gloucestershire Wildlife Trust owns and manages unit 2, which is called Old London Road reserve.

== Location ==
Wotton Hill lies on the Jurassic limestone scarp of the Cotswolds and includes disused quarries. It is an area of woodland, scrub, grassland and old quarries. It is to the west of the Coombe Hill SSSI.

== Woodland ==
Westridge Wood (unit 1) and Conygre Wood (unit 3) are the two main areas of ancient woodland, which are mostly beech. Ash and pedunculate oak are widespread, and other trees include field maple and locally small-leaved lime. Historically the woods were managed as coppice and old stools remain present. The woodland is now high forest with an understorey, and a rich flora which is characteristic of beech woods. Ground flora includes nettle-leaved bellflower, goldenrod, spurge laurel and tutsan. stinking hellebore and wood barley (Hordelymus europaeus) may also be found. The site is one of only two United Kingdom sites for the nationally rare limestone woundwort which is found and monitored in Old London Road reserve (unit 2). It is also now reported present in Westridge Wood and Conygre Wood.

Conygre Wood is listed in the 'Cotswold District' Local Plan 2001-2011 (on line).

== Grassland, scrub and quarries ==
The woods are linked by unimproved limestone grassland and scrub. (unit 5). The scrub and grassland in the disused quarries (unit 4) provides a good habitat for butterflies, which include chalkhill blue and brown argus.

== Geology ==
There are important exposures of rocks of the lower and middle Jurassic Periods. The lowest part of the exposure consists of Cotswold Sand Formation which is overlain by the 'Cephalopod bed'. The 'Cephalopod bed' exposure is relatively thick and contains valuable fossil molluscs ammonites. The 'Cephalopod bed' is overlain by the 'scissum' beds (Leckhampton Limestone) of the Middle Jurassic, Aalenian Stage. The upper exposure consists of lower Inferior Oolite (Fiddler’s Elbow Limestone and Frocester Hill Oolite). This is overlain by Upper 'Trigonia' Grit.

== SSSI Source ==
- Natural England SSSI information on the citation
- Natural England SSSI information on the Wotton Hill units

== Old London Road reserve ==
- Natural England SSSI information on Old London Road, Unit 2

=== Location ===
This reserve (grid reference ST755943) is a 0.22-hectare (0.54-acre) site on the top of the Cotswold scarp, which is one and a half miles north of Wotton-under-Edge. It was purchased by the Gloucestershire Wildlife Trust in 1972, primarily to safeguard one of the only two remaining British locations of limestone woundwort. It lies on Inferior Oolitic limestone and is part of a row of small narrow fields known locally as 'The Cupboards'. It lies between the Old London Road and the ancient Conygre Wood; the wood is on the steep-sloping scarp.

=== Plants ===
Limestone woundwort is protected under the 1981 Wildlife and Countryside Act, and was found in the area in 1897 by Mr C Buckenall. It has not been previously recorded in the United Kingdom. Another site was then discovered in Denbighshire. The plant grows in mountainous regions in central and southern Europe, and its alternative name is alpine woundwort. When the reserve was purchased only a few limestone woundwort plants remained. Dr M Martin (Bristol University) grew some from local seed. These were transplanted into the site. In a good season, a number of flowering spikes can be seen beneath the hedgerow on the site.

The hedgerow supports a diverse woodland flora which includes wood anemone, bluebell, ramsons (wood garlic), nettle-leaved bellflower and wood millet. The hedge comprises hawthorn, buckthorn, dogwood, hazel, ash, spindle and traveller's-joy. The fields support grassland flowers such as common fleabane, agrimony, cuckooflower, marjoram and bulbous buttercup.

=== Invertebrates and birds ===
The hedgerow and fields support many butterflies including chalkhill blue and silver-washed fritillary. Birdlife includes long-tailed tit, blackcap and robin.

=== Conservation ===
The prime aim is to increase the numbers of limestone woundwort, which are now reported present in the woodland units of the SSSI. Nettles are kept under control and the hedgerow is laid. Meadows are cut in June.

== Publications ==
- Kelham, A, Sanderson, J, Doe, J, Edgeley-Smith, M, et al., 1979, 1990, 2002 editions, 'Nature Reserves of the Gloucestershire Trust for Nature Conservation/Gloucestershire Wildlife Trust'
- 'Old London Road Nature Reserve near Wotton-under-Edge', (undated), Gloucestershire Wildlife Trust
