= Mamma Mia! (film) =

2008 film by Phyllida Lloyd

- North American theatrical release poster
- Directed by: Phyllida Lloyd
- Screenplay by: Catherine Johnson
- Based on: Mamma Mia! by Catherine Johnson
- Produced by: Judy Craymer; Gary Goetzman
- Starring: Meryl Streep; Pierce Brosnan; Colin Firth; Stellan Skarsgård; Julie Walters; Dominic Cooper; Amanda Seyfried; Christine Baranski
- Cinematography: Haris Zambarloukos
- Edited by: Lesley Walker
- Music by: Benny Andersson; Björn Ulvaeus
- Production companies: Universal Pictures; Relativity Media; Playtone; Littlestar Productions
- Distributed by: Universal Pictures
- Release dates: June 30, 2008 (Leicester Square); July 10, 2008 (United Kingdom); July 18, 2008 (United States)
- Running time: 109 minutes
- Countries: United States; United Kingdom (Note: Mamma Mia! is listed as a production of both the United States and United Kingdom, attributed to multiple sources:)
- Language: English
- Budget: $52 million
- Box office: $708.2 million

Mamma Mia! (promoted as Mamma Mia! The Movie) is a 2008 jukebox musical romantic comedy film directed by Phyllida Lloyd and written by Catherine Johnson, based on her book from the 1999 musical. The film features an ensemble cast, including Meryl Streep, Pierce Brosnan, Colin Firth, Stellan Skarsgård, Julie Walters, Dominic Cooper, Amanda Seyfried, and Christine Baranski. The film follows a young bride-to-be named Sophie who invites three men to her upcoming wedding, with the possibility that any of them could be her real father.

Principal photography primarily took place on the Greek island of Skopelos from August to September 2007, with ABBA members Benny Andersson and Björn Ulvaeus composing the film's score. Mamma Mia! premiered at the Leicester Square in London on June 30, 2008, before being released in the United Kingdom on July 10, and in the United States on July 18, by Universal Pictures. It received mixed reviews from critics and was a box-office success, grossing $708.2 million worldwide on a $52 million budget, becoming the fifth highest-grossing film of 2008. A sequel, titled Mamma Mia! Here We Go Again, was released on July 20, 2018, with much of the cast returning.

== Plot ==
On the fictional Greek island of Kalokairi (Greek for 'summer'), bride-to-be Sophie Sheridan reveals to her bridesmaids that she has secretly invited three men to her wedding without telling her mother, Donna: Irish-American architect Sam Carmichael, Swedish travel writer Bill Anderson, and British banker Harry Bright. One of the three is Sophie's biological father, though she doesn't know which, and she wants him to give her away at the wedding; she believes that after spending time with each of them, she will learn who fathered her.

When the three men arrive at Kalokairi, Sophie explains she sent the wedding invitations, not Donna, but does not reveal that she believes one of them is her father. She hides the men in Donna's goat house, and they hesitantly agree not to reveal themselves yet, as it is a surprise.

As Donna is working on the goat house, she spies on them. Dumbfounded to find herself facing her former lovers, she demands they leave. Donna confides in her old friends Tanya and Rosie, who have also arrived for the wedding, that she truly does not know which of the three fathered Sophie.

Sophie finds the men aboard Bill's sailboat and they sail around Kalokairi, with the men bonding with Sophie and telling her stories of Donna's carefree youth. Sophie attempts to tell her fiancé Sky about her ploy but loses her nerve.

At Sophie's bachelorette party, Donna is distressed by the three men's presence, but Rosie and Tanya assure her that they will take care of them. Sophie talks with each man alone.

- Bill learns that Donna received the money for her villa from his great-aunt Sofia whereas he had understood the money was bequeathed "to family"; as a result, they believe he is her father and she asks him to give her away but keep their secret until the wedding.
- Sam deduces (rightly or wrongly) that he is her father and asks who is giving her away. She says "no-one" and Sam offers. They agree to keep it a secret until the wedding.
- Harry similarly deduces (rightly or wrongly) and states that he'll walk her down the aisle, giving her no chance to decline.

In the morning, Donna attempts to comfort Sophie and offers to cancel the wedding; Sophie reacts angrily, saying she wants to avoid her mother's mistakes. Sam attempts to discuss the wedding with Donna, and both realize they still have feelings for each other. Sophie admits her actions to Sky and asks for his help, but he reacts angrily to her deception.

As they prepare for the wedding Donna admits to Sophie that her mother disowned her after she got pregnant, but she could not be more proud of having her. Sophie then asks Donna to give her away, to which Donna happily agrees.

As the bridal party and guests enter the chapel Sam intercepts Donna, who reveals the pain she felt over losing him. At the wedding, Sam reveals that he had ended his engagement, but returned to find Donna had gone off with another man (Bill).

The three men agree with Sophie that they do not want the paternity confirmed, each agreeing to be one-third of a father for Sophie. Sophie suggests to Sky that they postpone their wedding and travel the world. Sam proposes to Donna, revealing that he is divorced and has always loved her. She happily accepts and they marry on the spot.

== Cast ==
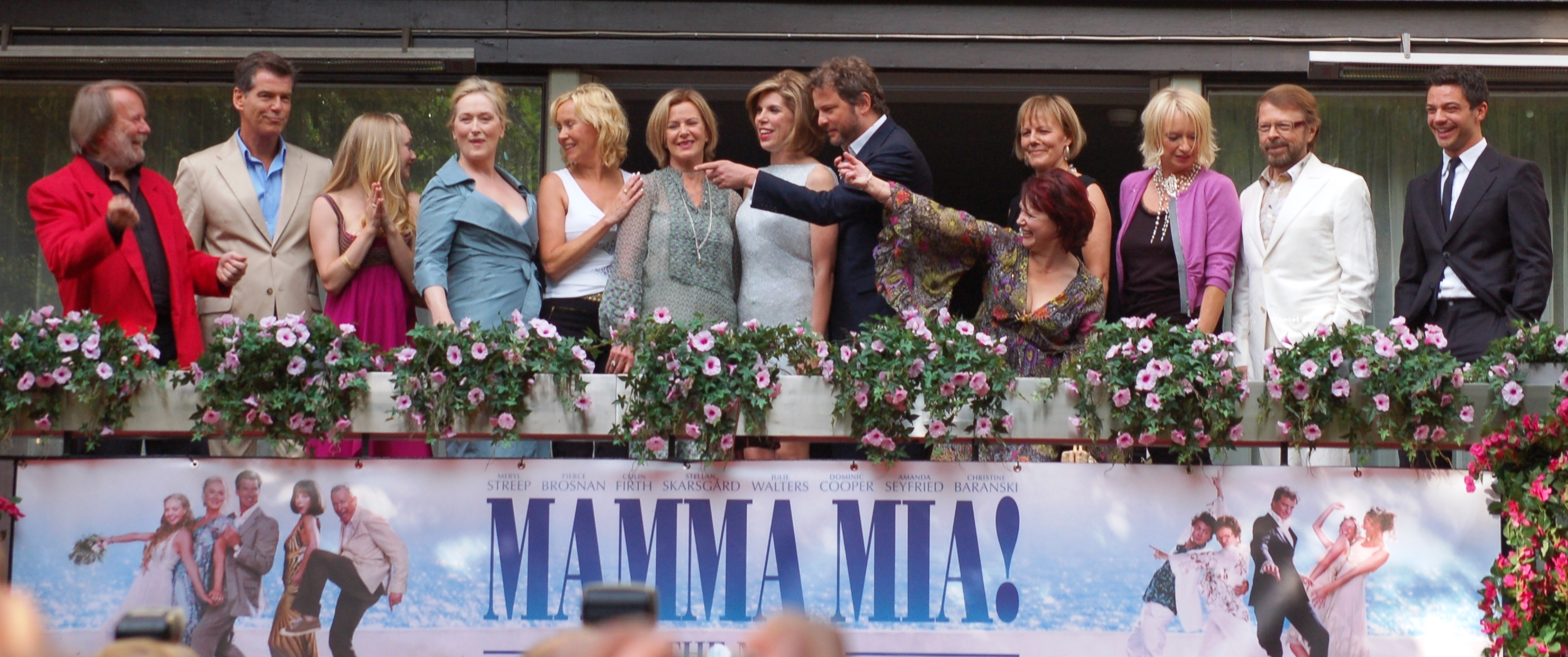
ABBA appeared together with the film's cast and crew in 2008. (Left to right: Benny Andersson, Pierce Brosnan, Amanda Seyfried, Meryl Streep, Agnetha Fältskog, Anni-Frid Lyngstad, Christine Baranski, Colin Firth, Catherine Johnson, Phyllida Lloyd, Judy Craymer, Björn Ulvaeus and Dominic Cooper)

- Meryl Streep as Donna Sheridan, Sophie's mother and the owner of the hotel Villa Donna in Greece
- Pierce Brosnan as Sam Carmichael, Sophie's possible father and an Irish-American architect
- Colin Firth as Harry Bright, Sophie's possible father and a British banker
- Stellan Skarsgård as Bill Anderson, Sophie's possible father, a Swedish sailor and travel writer
- Julie Walters as Rosie Mulligan, one of Donna's former bandmates in Donna and the Dynamos; an unmarried, fun-loving author
- Dominic Cooper as Sky Rymand, Sophie's fiancé who is designing a website for the hotel
- Amanda Seyfried as Sophie Sheridan, Donna's 20-year-old daughter and Sky's fiancée
- Christine Baranski as Tanya Chesham-Leigh, Donna's other former bandmate; a rich three-time divorcée
- Rachel McDowall as Lisa, a close friend of Sophie and her bridesmaid
- Ashley Lilley as Ali, a close friend of Sophie and her bridesmaid
- Ricardo Montez as Stavros
- Enzo Squillino Jr. as Gregoris, one of Donna's employees
- Philip Michael as Pepper, a bartender and Sky's best man who takes an interest in Tanya
- Chris Jarvis as Eddie, a friend of Sky and Pepper
- Juan Pablo Di Pace as Petros, Harry's partner
- Niall Buggy as Father Alex, a wedding priest
- Benny Andersson as "Dancing Queen" piano player (uncredited)
- Spencer Kayden as Agnes (uncredited)
- Björn Ulvaeus as Greek god (uncredited)

== Soundtrack ==
A soundtrack album was released on July 7, 2008, by Decca in the United States and Polydor internationally. The recording was produced by Benny Andersson. The album features sixteen musical numbers from the film, including a hidden track. The album was nominated at the 51st Annual Grammy Awards for Best Compilation Soundtrack Album for Motion Picture, Television or Other Visual Media. The deluxe edition of the soundtrack album was released on November 25, 2008.

1. "I Have a Dream" (Prologue) – Sophie
2. "Honey, Honey" – Sophie, Ali and Lisa
3. "Money, Money, Money" – Donna, Tanya and Rosie
4. "Mamma Mia" – Donna
5. "Chiquitita" – Rosie, Tanya and Donna^{†}
6. "Dancing Queen" – Tanya, Rosie and Donna
7. "Our Last Summer" – Harry, Bill, Sam, and Sophie
8. "Lay All Your Love on Me" – Sky and Sophie
9. "Super Trouper" – Donna, Tanya and Rosie
10. "Gimme! Gimme! Gimme! (A Man After Midnight)" – Sophie, Ali and Lisa
11. "Voulez-Vous" – Donna, Sam, Tanya, Rosie, Harry, Bill, Sky, Ali, Lisa and Pepper
12. "SOS" – Sam and Donna
13. "Does Your Mother Know" – Tanya and Pepper
14. "Slipping Through My Fingers" – Donna and Sophie
15. "The Winner Takes It All" – Donna
16. "I Do, I Do, I Do, I Do, I Do" – Sam and Donna^{†}
17. "When All Is Said and Done" – Sam and Donna
18. "Take a Chance on Me" – Rosie, Bill, Tanya, Pepper, and Harry
19. "Mamma Mia" (Reprise) – Donna, Tanya, Rosie, Harry, Sam, Bill, Sky, Sophie, Ali, Lisa, Pepper
20. "I Have a Dream" – Sophie
21. "Dancing Queen" (Reprise) – Tanya, Rosie, and Donna
22. "Waterloo" – Donna, Rosie, Tanya, Sam, Bill, Harry, Sky, and Sophie^{†}
23. "Thank You for the Music" (End Credits) – Sophie^{§}
- ^{†} Featured in the film, but omitted from the soundtrack album.
- ^{§} Included on the soundtrack album as a hidden track.

== Production ==
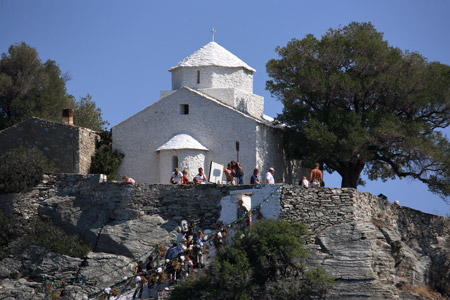
The Agios Ioannis chapel during filming of the wedding scene for Mamma Mia!.

Most of the outdoor scenes were filmed on location at the small Greek islands of Skopelos and Skiathos, in Thessaly (between August 29 and September 2007), and the seaside hamlet of Damouchari in the Pelion area of Greece. On Skopelos, Kastani beach on the southwest coast was the film's main location site. The producers built a beach bar and jetty along the beach but removed both set pieces after production wrapped. The wedding procession was filmed at the Agios Ioannis Chapel near Glossa.

A complete set for Donna's Greek villa was built at the 007 stage at Pinewood Studios and most of the film was shot there. Real trees were used for the set, watered daily through an automated watering system and given access to daylight to keep them growing. The part of the film where Brosnan's character, Sam, leaves his New York office to go to the Greek Island was actually filmed at the Lloyd's building on Lime Street in the City of London. He dashes down the escalators and through the porte-cochere, where yellow cabs and actors representing New York mounted police were used for verisimilitude.

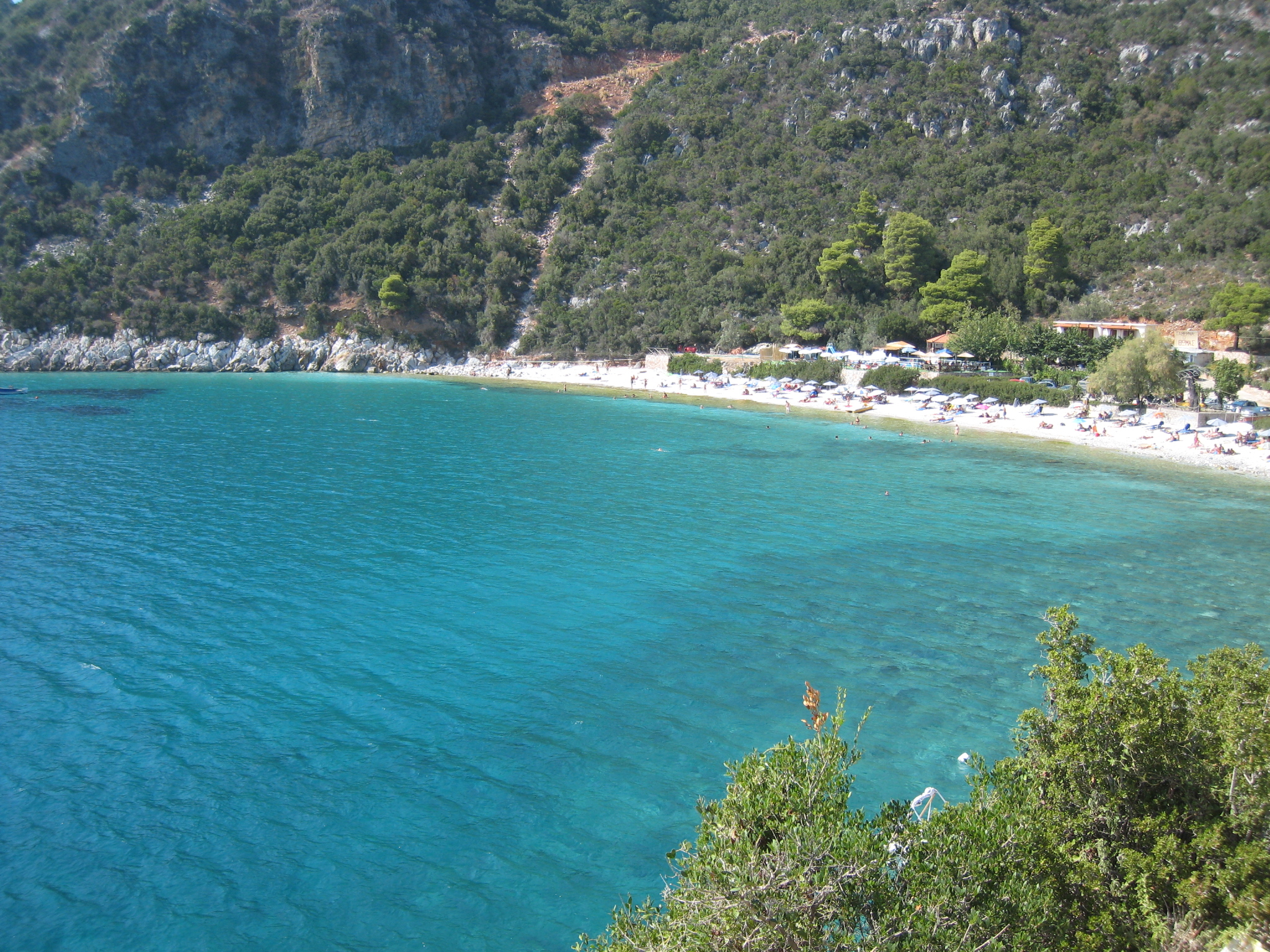
The film was shot partly on the Greek island of Skopelos.

The Fernando, Bill Anderson's yacht in the film, was the ketch Tai-Mo-Shan, built in 1934 by H. S. Rouse at the Hong Kong and Whampoa dockyards.

Meryl Streep took opera singing lessons as a child, and as an adult, she had previously sung in several films, including Postcards from the Edge, Silkwood, Death Becomes Her, and A Prairie Home Companion. She was a fan of the stage show Mamma Mia! after seeing it on Broadway in September 2001, saying that she found the show to be an affirmation of life in the midst of the destruction of 9/11.

Amy Adams, Brittany Murphy, Busy Philipps, Evan Rachel Wood, Jessica Biel, Kirsten Dunst, Leighton Meester, Mandy Moore, and Zooey Deschanel auditioned for the role of Sophie. Tom Hanks auditioned for a role in the film, but he was rejected as his singing was "too bad". Adam Sandler, Donny Osmond, John Travolta, and John Turturro were all considered for the role of Sam Carmichael. Robin Williams, Steve Buscemi, Paul Giamatti, and Jim Carrey were all considered for the role of Harry Bright. Eric Bana, Hugo Weaving, David Hasselhoff, and Jim Belushi were all considered for the role of Bill Anderson. Jennifer Coolidge, Catherine O'Hara, and Caroline Rhea were all considered for the role of Donna.

== Release ==
Though the world premiere of the film occurred elsewhere, most of the media attention was focused on the Swedish premiere, where Anni-Frid Lyngstad and Agnetha Fältskog joined Björn Ulvaeus and Benny Andersson with the cast at the Rival Theatre in Mariatorget, Stockholm, owned by Andersson, on July 4, 2008. It was the first time all four members of ABBA had been photographed together since 1986.

=== Home media ===
In November 2008, Mamma Mia! became the fastest-selling DVD of all time in the UK according to Official UK Charts Company figures. It sold 1,669,084 copies on its first day of release, breaking the previous record (held by Titanic) by 560,000 copies. By the end of 2008, the Official UK Charts Company declared that it had become the biggest-selling DVD ever in the UK, with one in every four households owning a copy (over 5 million copies sold). The record was previously held by Pirates of the Caribbean: The Curse of the Black Pearl with sales of 4.7 million copies.

In the United States, the DVD made over $30 million on its first day of release. Mamma Mia! was released on DVD and Blu-ray on December 16, 2008. By December 31, 2008, Mamma Mia! became the bestselling DVD of all time in Sweden with 545,000 copies sold.

== Reception ==
=== Box office ===
Mamma Mia! grossed $144.3 million in the United States and Canada, and $563.8 million in other territories, for a worldwide total of $708.2 million, against a production budget of $52 million. In its initial release, it became the highest-grossing live-action musical of all time, the highest-grossing film directed by a woman, and the highest-grossing adaptation of a Broadway musical. Its records have since been surpassed by Bill Condon's Beauty and the Beast, Patty Jenkins' Wonder Woman (both 2017), and Jon M. Chu's Wicked (2024), respectively. Mamma Mia! was additionally the third highest-grossing film of 2008 internationally, with a cume of $458.4 million, and the thirteenth-highest-grossing film of 2008 in North America, with $144.1 million.

The film made $9.6 million on its opening day in the United States and Canada, as well as $27.6 million on its opening weekend, ranking #2 at the box office, behind The Dark Knight. At the time, it made Mamma Mia! the record-holder for the highest grossing opening weekend for a movie based on a Broadway musical, surpassing Hairspray's box office record in 2007 and later surpassed by Into the Woods. In the United Kingdom, Mamma Mia! grossed £69.2 million as of January 23, 2009; it is the thirteenth highest-grossing film of all time at the UK box office. The film opened at number one in the UK, taking £6.6 million on 496 screens. It managed to hold on to the top spot for two weeks, narrowly keeping Pixar's WALL-E from reaching number one in its second week.

When released on July 3, 2009, in Greece, the film grossed $1.6 million in its opening weekend, reaching number one at the Greek box office.

=== Critical response ===
Mamma Mia! received mixed reviews upon release. The review aggregator website Rotten Tomatoes reported that out of 186 critic reviews, 54% of them were positive, with an average rating of 5.8/10. The site's consensus reads, "This jukebox musical is full of fluffy fun but rough singing voices and a campy tone might not make you feel like 'You Can Dance' the whole 90 minutes." Metacritic assigned the film a weighted average score of 51 out of 100, based on 37 critics, indicating "mixed or average" reviews. Audiences polled by CinemaScore gave the film an average grade of "A−" on an A+ to F scale.

BBC Radio 5 Live's film critic Mark Kermode admitted to enjoying the film, despite describing the experience as "the closest you get to see A-List actors doing drunken karaoke". Peter Bradshaw of The Guardian was more negative, giving it one star, and expressed a "need to vomit". Bob Chipman of Escape to the Movies said it was "so base, so shallow and so hinged on meaningless spectacle, it's amazing it wasn't made for men". The Daily Telegraph stated that it was enjoyable but poorly put together: "Finding the film a total shambles was sort of a shame, but I have a sneaking suspicion I'll go to see it again anyway." Angie Errigo of Empire said it was "cute, clean, camp fun, full of sunshine and toe tappers."

The casting of actors not known for their singing abilities led to some mixed reviews. Variety stated that "some stars, especially the bouncy and rejuvenated Streep, seem better suited for musical comedy than others, including Brosnan and Skarsgård." Brosnan, especially, was savaged by many critics: his singing was compared to "a water buffalo" (New York Magazine), "a donkey braying" (The Philadelphia Inquirer) and "a wounded raccoon" (The Miami Herald), and Matt Brunson of Creative Loafing Charlotte said he "looks physically pained choking out the lyrics, as if he's being subjected to a prostate exam just outside of the camera's eye."

In 2025, it was one of the films voted for the "Readers' Choice" edition of The New York Times' list of "The 100 Best Movies of the 21st Century," finishing at number 183.

=== Accolades ===
Award	Date of ceremony	Category	Recipient(s)	Result	Ref.
ACE Eddie Awards	February 15, 2009	Best Edited Feature Film – Comedy or Musical	Lesley Walker	Nominated	
American Music Awards	November 23, 2008	Favorite Soundtrack	Mamma Mia! The Movie Soundtrack	Nominated	
British Academy Film Awards	February 8, 2009	Outstanding British Film	Mamma Mia!	Nominated	
British Academy Film Awards	February 8, 2009	Best Film Music	Benny Andersson and Björn Ulvaeus	Nominated	
British Academy Film Awards	February 8, 2009	Carl Foreman Award for Special Achievement by a British Director, Writer or Producer for their First Feature Film	Judy Craymer	Nominated	
Costume Designers Guild Awards	February 17, 2009	Excellence in Contemporary Film	Ann Roth	Nominated	
Empire Award	March 29, 2009	Best Soundtrack	Benny Andersson and Björn Ulvaeus	Won	
Golden Globe Awards	January 11, 2009	Best Motion Picture – Musical or Comedy	Mamma Mia!	Nominated	
Golden Globe Awards	January 11, 2009	Best Actress – Motion Picture Comedy or Musical	Meryl Streep	Nominated	
Golden Raspberry Awards	February 21, 2009	Worst Supporting Actor	Pierce Brosnan	Won	
Golden Reel Awards	February 21, 2009	Best Sound Editing – Music in a Musical Feature Film	Tony Lewis, Martin Lowe, Robert Houston	Won	
Grammy Awards	February 8, 2009	Best Compilation Soundtrack Album for Motion Picture, Television or Other Visual Media	Mamma Mia! The Movie Soundtrack	Nominated	
Irish Film and Television Awards	February 14, 2009	Best International Actress	Meryl Streep	Won	
MTV Movie Awards	May 31, 2009	Best Breakthrough Female Performance	Amanda Seyfried	Nominated	
National Movie Awards	September 8, 2008	Best Musical	Mamma Mia!	Won	
National Movie Awards	September 8, 2008	Best Female Performance	Meryl Streep	Won	
National Movie Awards	September 8, 2008	Best Male Performance	Pierce Brosnan	Nominated	
National Movie Awards	September 8, 2008	Best Male Performance	Colin Firth	Nominated	
People's Choice Awards	January 7, 2009	Favorite Movie Comedy	Mamma Mia!	Nominated	
People's Choice Awards	January 7, 2009	Favorite Cast	Mamma Mia!	Nominated	
People's Choice Awards	January 7, 2009	Favorite Song from a Soundtrack	"Mamma Mia"	Won	
Rembrandt Awards	March 9, 2009	Best Female Actress	Meryl Streep	Won	
Rembrandt Awards	March 9, 2009	Best International Actress	Meryl Streep	Won	
Rembrandt Awards	March 9, 2009	Best International Film	Phyllida Lloyd	Won	
Satellite Awards	December 14, 2008	Best Actress in a Motion Picture, Comedy or Musical	Meryl Streep	Nominated	

== Sequel ==
Mamma Mia! Here We Go Again was announced on May 19, 2017, and premiered on July 18, 2018. It was written and directed by Ol Parker. It was announced that Seyfried, Cooper, Streep, Firth and Brosnan would be returning. In July 2017, Lily James was confirmed to portray young Donna. The film took almost five months to film and was released in London and Sweden on July 16, 2018, and was released worldwide on July 20, 2018. The film was a commercial success and made $402 million worldwide with a $75 million budget. Reviews were generally positive, with critics praising the performances and musical numbers. The film was released digitally on October 9, 2018, and on DVD on October 23, 2018. It held the top spot on the charts for the week ending November 3, 2018.

== See also ==
- Buona Sera, Mrs. Campbell, a 1968 film about a woman who does not know which of three men is the father of her daughter, which some critics speculate Mamma Mia! was based upon.
- Lace, a 1984 miniseries about a daughter who tries to figure out which of three women is her mother.
- Mamma Mia, a television episode of the series 30 Rock that was heavily influenced by Mamma Mia!.
