= Wotton-under-Edge =

Market town in Gloucestershire, England

Coordinates: 51.638°N 2.349°W

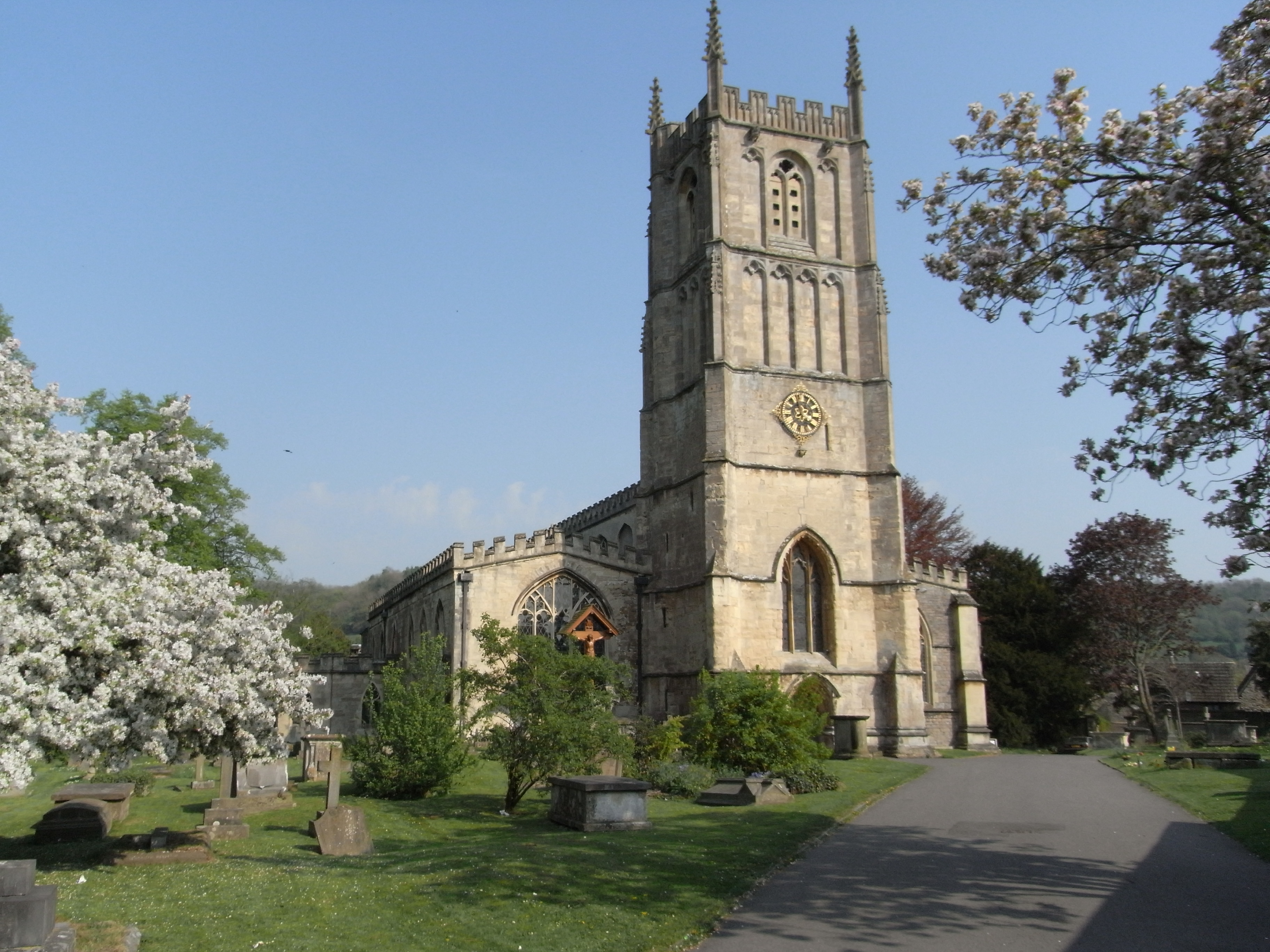
- St Mary the Virgin, Wotton-under-Edge

- Location within Gloucestershire
- Population: 5,632 (2021 Census)
- OS grid reference: ST758933
- Civil parish: Wotton-under-Edge
- District: Stroud
- Shire county: Gloucestershire
- Region: South West
- Country: England
- Sovereign state: United Kingdom
- Post town: WOTTON-UNDER-EDGE
- Postcode district: GL12
- Dialling code: 01453
- Police: Gloucestershire
- Fire: Gloucestershire
- Ambulance: South Western
- UK Parliament: Stroud

Wotton-under-Edge /ˈwʊtən/ is a market town and civil parish in the Stroud district of Gloucestershire, England. Near the southern fringe of the Cotswolds, the Cotswold Way long-distance footpath passes through the town. In 2021 the parish had a population of 5,632.

== History ==
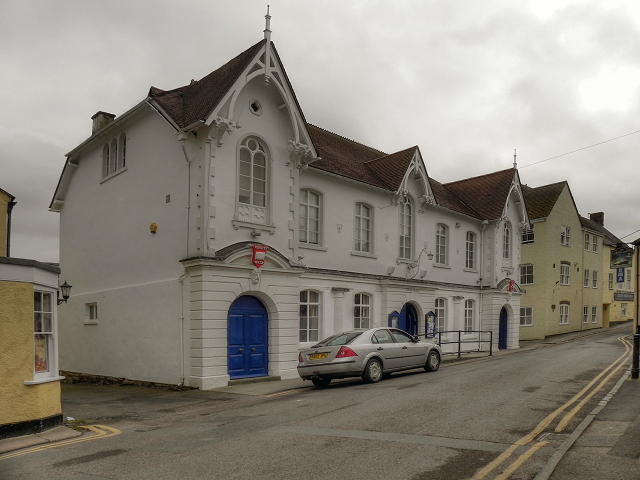
Wotton-under-Edge Town Hall

The first record of the town is in an Anglo-Saxon Royal Charter of King Edmund I, who in AD 940 leased four hides of land in Wudetun to Eadric. The name Wudetun means the enclosure, homestead or village (tun) in or near the wood (wude). The "Edge" refers to the limestone escarpment of the Cotswold Edge which includes the hills of Wotton Hill and Tor Hill that flank the town. In the 1086 Domesday Book listing, Wotton was in the hundred of Dudstone. Kingswood Abbey was founded in 1139, but all that remains is a 16th-century Cistercian gatehouse. Nearby historical buildings include the Tudor houses of Newark Park and Owlpen Manor, both open to the public at set times. The medieval former public house The Ancient Ram Inn dates back to 1145. The original town was burnt down during the reign of King John (1199–1216); it was rebuilt in 1252 and a charter granted to Johanna de Berkeley authorising her to hold a market and a three-day annual fair on the Feast of the Cross. In 1272 the inhabitants of the borough were authorised to elect one of their members as a Mayor, a practice that continued every year until 1886.

St Mary the Virgin was consecrated in 1283, and is the oldest and largest church in the town. The Katharine Lady Berkeley's Grammar School was established in 1384 and is now a comprehensive named Katharine Lady Berkeley's School although the present modern building is a little outside of the town on the way to the village of Kingswood. The British School was established in the village in 1835.

The Battle of Nibley Green occurred near the Ancient Ram Inn in 1470 (or 1469 under the calendar of the time), when the building was owned by Thomas Talbot, 2nd Viscount Lisle. William de Berkeley, 1st Marquess of Berkeley led the forces that beat the Viscount, and after the battle his men sacked the manor. Overlooking the town on the top of Wotton Hill are a collection of trees planted in the 19th century to commemorate the Battle of Waterloo. These are situated on the site that housed one of the early warning beacons used to warn England of the approach of the Spanish Armada in 1588.

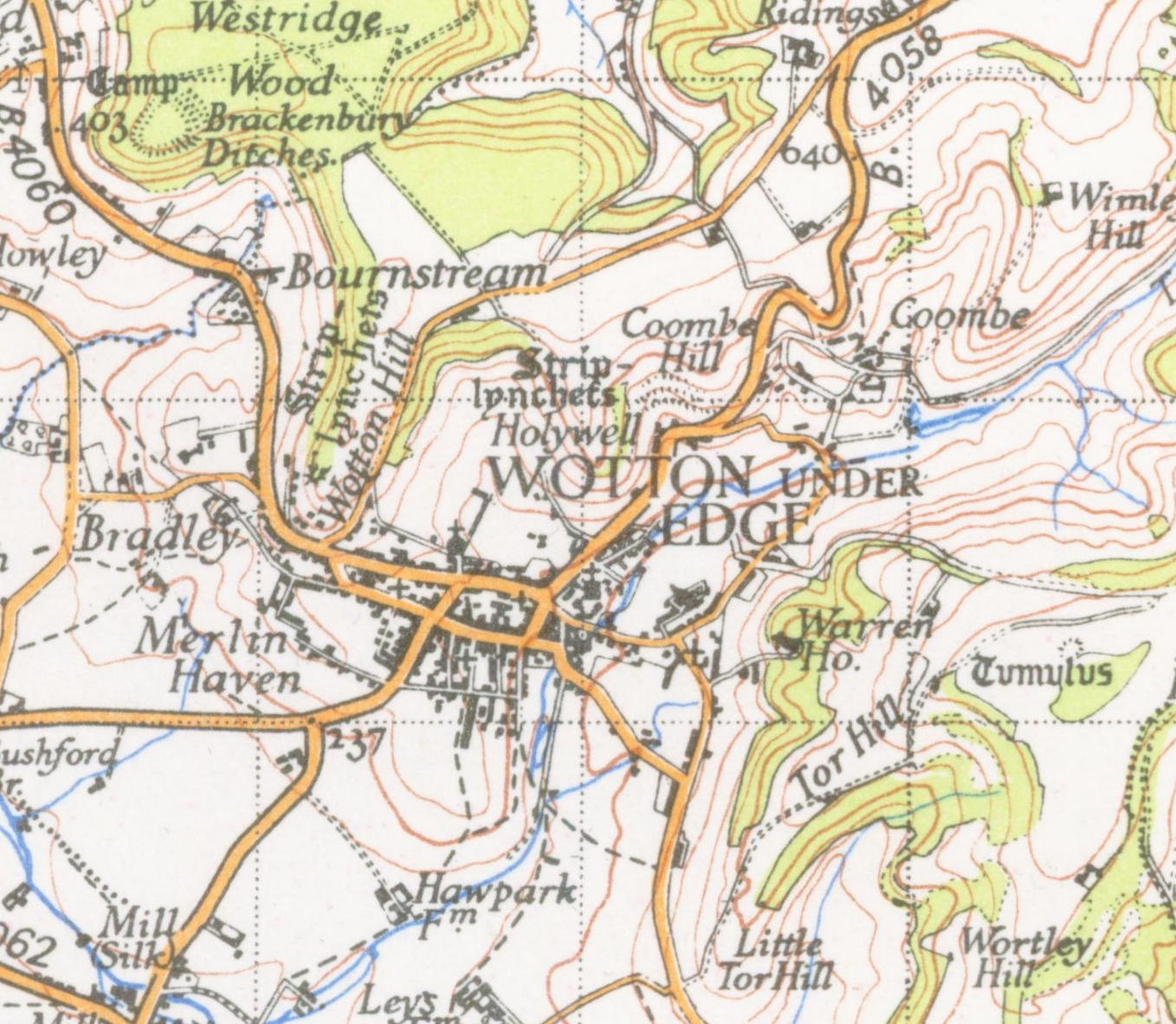
A map of Wotton-under-Edge from 1946

New Mills, founded in 1810, prospered by supplying both sides in the Napoleonic Wars but after a century of decline the mill was near to closing in 1981 when it was acquired by Renishaw plc.

Wotton-under-Edge Town Hall was substantially rebuilt in 1872. The town's corporation status was abolished in 1886 following the Municipal Corporations Act 1883 (46 & 47 Vict. c. 18).

== Governance ==
An electoral ward with the same name exists. The ward mainly covers Wotton-under-Edge but also stretches to North Nibley. The total population of the ward taken at the 2011 census was 6,510.

== Facilities ==
The town has several pubs and a hotel, and a range of takeaways and restaurants. It has several active social groups, such as Scouts, a gardening club and the Wotton Lions. In 1958, local people and school students built the town swimming pool, which was completed in 1961. Subsequently the pool has had solar and electric heating installed. In 1999 with the fund raising support of community groups, a retractable enclosure was fitted to prolong the swimming season. In 2015, a skate park was opened.

In 2002, following the closure of the local cinema, a group of volunteers raised funds for a refurbishment to become one of the first digital cinemas in the UK. It re-opened in 2005 as a 100-seat facility inside an old stable yard, once part of the Crown Inn which closed in 1911. Films were first shown in the old Banqueting Hall of the Inn and moved to the stable yard some years later, due to the popularity of films. The Wotton Electric Picture House (the original name) is now a thriving venue.

On the hills immediately to the east, the Wotton-under-Edge BT Tower formed part of the microwave communication network between Bristol, Corsham and London during the Cold War before decommissioning, and remains a prominent local landmark (albeit without its distinctive horn aerials). Nearby Newark Park is operated by the National Trust as a heritage attraction within walking distance of the town, along with the Neolithic long barrow on a prominent position atop Blackquarries Hill.

== Media ==
Local news and television programmes are provided by BBC West and ITV West Country. Television signals are received from the Mendip TV transmitter. Local radio stations are BBC Radio Gloucestershire, Heart West, Greatest Hits Radio South West and Edge Radio, a community based station which started broadcasting during the COVID-19 pandemic in 2020. The town is served by the local newspaper, Gazette Series.

== Transport ==
=== Road ===
Wotton-under-Edge is on the B4058 road and is 5 miles (8.0 km) from the M5 motorway.

=== Rail ===
Brunel's Bristol and Gloucester Railway passes within 2 miles (3.2 km) of Wotton-under-Edge, following a curve to the west to stay on the gentler Vale of Berkeley and avoid Wotton Hill, Nibley Knoll and Stinchcombe Hill as it heads north. It carries a wide mix of local, intercity and freight trains. The nearest railway station on this line is Cam & Dursley, 7 miles (11 km) north of the town centre.

Charfield station, 2.5 miles (4.0 km) to the west, was opened in 1844 and closed in 1965 during the Beeching cuts, leaving Wotton with no rail access. A branch line from Charfield to Wotton was authorised in 1899 under the Light Railways Act, but never constructed.

Following the successful reopening of neighbouring Yate in 1989 and Cam & Dursley in 1994, plans to reopen Charfield station were developed by the West of England Combined Authority in 2021; a planning application was submitted in September 2022, with planning permission granted in March 2023. A "Greenway" is also proposed to allow traffic-free walking and cycling between Wotton, Kingswood and Charfield.

=== Bus ===
Bus services link the town to Charfield, Dursley, Yate, Chipping Sodbury, Nailsworth, Stroud, and Thornbury, but run infrequently. Wotton is not part of WECA, but Katherine Lady Berkeley's school is served by the WESTlink on-demand bus, a short walk from the town centre and available to the public Monday-Saturday.

=== Hiking routes ===
- The Cotswold Way follows a route down Wotton Hill and through the centre of the town, making it a popular stopover with hikers.
- The Slow Ways traffic-free accessible walking project connects Wotton to Dursley, Yate, Thornbury, Tetbury and Sherston.
- The Monarch's Way passes within 2.5 miles (4.0 km) of Wotton through nearby Tresham and Hawkesbury Upton.

== Notable people ==
- More Adey (1858–1942) – art critic
- Ian Alexander – footballer
- Thomas de Berkeley, 5th Baron Berkeley (d.1417)
- John Biddle – Unitarian
- Charles Blagden – physician
- Sophie Brzeska – writer.
- Bruce Chatwin – writer. Chatwin and his wife Elizabeth owned the house Holwell Farm from the mid-1960s to the 1980s.
- Ann Dinham – born Ann Orchard, later Ann Riddiford and then Ann Foster; exiled to Tasmania in 1851 for "inciting a burglary".
- U. A. Fanthorpe – poet
- Sir Matthew Hale – Lord Chief Justice (1671–1676)
- Matthew Blagden Hale – bishop
- Evan Hayward – Member of Parliament
- Mark Horton – archaeologist
- Edward Jenner – Physician and scientist. Attended the local grammar school (The Katharine Lady Berkeley's Grammar School)
- Catherine Johnson – playwright
- Richard Knill – missionary
- James Lees-Milne and his wife Alvilde Lees-Milne – writers, lived at Alderley Grange for 13 years during the 1960s and 70s.
- Ian MacDonald (1948–2003) – music critic and author
- Sir Isaac Pitman – creator of Pitman Shorthand, Pitman Place is named after him
- Mark Porter – doctor
- Sean Rigg – footballer
- Jamie Stephens – footballer
- Ella Stevens – racing driver
