= Alexa Davies =

Welsh actress

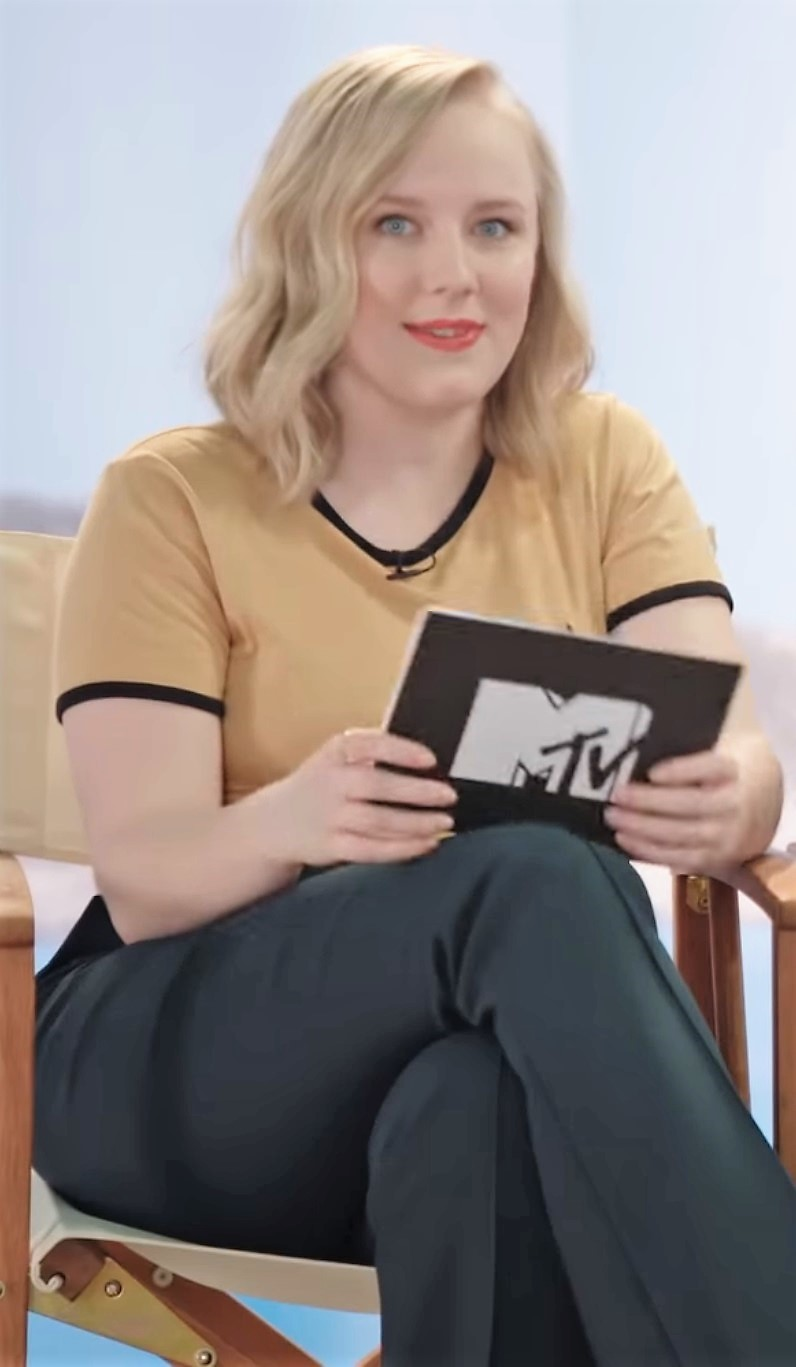
- Davies on MTV International in 2018
- Born: Rhyl, Wales
- Occupation: Actress
- Years active: 2012–present

Alexa Davies is a Welsh actress best known for her roles as Aretha in Raised by Wolves, Kate in Detectorists, Yvonne in Cradle to Grave, young Rosie in Mamma Mia! Here We Go Again, and Meg in Dead Pixels.

She grew up in Rhyl, Denbighshire.

== Filmography ==
=== Film ===
Year	Title	Role	Notes
2012	Vinyl	Flora	
2012	Bunking Off	Scarlet	Short film
2014	X+Y	Rebecca Dunn	
2015	Absolutely Anything	Sandwich Girl	
2015	Dusha shpiona	Alexa Nottingham	Also known as The Soul of a Spy
2016	Spaceship	Lucidia	
2017	The Sense of an Ending	Receptionist	
2017	Sticky	Karen	
2018	Mamma Mia! Here We Go Again	Young Rosie	
2020	Misbehaviour	Sue	
2021	I Am a Unicorn	Daisy	Short film
2022	The Debutante	Hyena	Short film. Based on the short story by Leonora Carrington
2024	Wolf	Sammy	Short film
2026	Effi O Blaenau	Gemma	

=== Television ===
Year	Title	Role	Notes
2012	New Tricks	Jess Kemp	Series 9; episode 6: "Love Means Nothing in Tennis"
2012	Doctors	Naomi Taggart	Series 14; episode 112: "An Appropriate Adult"
2012	Little Crackers	Hilary	Series 3, episode 5: "Alison Steadman's Little Cracker: The Autograph"
2013–2016	Raised by Wolves	Aretha Garry	Series 1 & 2; 13 episodes
2014	The Midnight Beast	Hope's Friend	Series 2; episodes 1 & 5: "The Twilight Beast" and "They Came Upon a Midnight Beast"
2014	Holby City	Kayleigh Ormerod	Series 16; episode 22: "Exit Strategy: Part One"
2014	Trying Again	Waitress	Episode 6
2014	Cuckoo	Chastity	Series 2; episode 4: "Funeral"
2015	Cradle to Grave	Yvonne	Mini-series; 6 episodes
2015–2017	Detectorists	Kate	Series 2 & 3; 10 episodes
2016	The Five	Alexa Mills	Mini-series; episodes 4 & 6
2016	Avatards	Meg	Mini-series; episodes 1–3
2016	Suspects	Daisy Bellamy	Series 5; episode 1: "The Enemy Within: Part 1"
2017	Harlots	Betsey Fletcher	Series 1; episodes 1–8
2017	Grantchester	Luella	Series 3; episode 5
2018	Down the Caravan	Carrie	Television film
2019–2021	Dead Pixels	Meg	Series 1 & 2; 12 episodes
2020	Silent Witness	Lucie Hudson	Series 23; episodes 5 & 6: "Seven Times: Parts 1 & 2"
2020	White House Farm	Julie Mugford	Mini-series; episodes 1–6
2020	Honour	Keilly Jones	Mini-series; episodes 1 & 2
2021–2023	COBRA	Audrey Hemmings	Series 2 & 3; 12 episodes
2022	Four Lives	Kiera	Also known as The Barking Murders. Mini-series; episodes 1–3
2022	Sneakerhead	Clare	Episodes 1–3
2022–2024	Funny Woman	Marjorie Harrison	Series 1 & 2; 10 episodes
2023	The Long Shadow	Ruth Bundey	Mini-series; episodes 5–7
2025	Call the Midwife	Norma Lasley	Series 14; episode 3
2025	Play for Today	Jade	Episode: "Big Winners"
2026	Unchosen	Hannah	6 episodes
2026	Believe Me	PC Ellis	Episode 2
TBA	Agatha Christie's Tommy & Tuppence	Fran	Mini-series; episode 5
