= Ashley Lilley =

Scottish actress and singer

Ashley-Anne Lilley is a Scottish actress and singer. She made her debut in the 2008 film Mamma Mia!.

== Early life ==
Lilley was born in Rothesay, Bute. At the age of 12, she won a place with the National Youth Music Theatre. At 15, she enrolled at the Italia Conti Academy of Theatre Arts in London, and graduated in 2004.

== Career ==
Lilley is primarily a stage actress, with a small number (five, starting with one episode of M.I. High in 2008 and ending with one episode of Lip Service in 2010) of film and television roles. She starred as Lucille Frank in a production of Jason Robert Brown's Parade at the Edinburgh fringe festival in 2005. She then joined the UK tour of Cole Porter's Anything Goes in the role of Hope Harcourt. She made her film debut as Ali in 2008 in Mamma Mia!, appeared in the 11-minute short Cat Eats Dog (2009), and the romantic drama film Letters to Juliet (2010). She returned to theatre in 2011, starring in a new production, Nicked, at the HighTide festival.

== Filmography ==
Year	Title	Role	Notes	Ref(s)
2008	Mamma Mia!	Ali		
2009	M.I. High	Venus Houston	Episode: Moontaker	
2009	Cat Eats Dog	Dot	Short movie	
2010	Letters to Juliet	Patricia		
2010	Lip Service	Carla	Series 1, Episode 1	
