= Philip Michael =

British actor and tenor

- Born: Philip Michael; London, England
- Education: Italia Conti Academy of Theatre Arts
- Occupation: Actor · stuntman · tenor

Philip Michael is a British actor, stuntman, and tenor. He is best known for his roles in Mamma Mia! as Pepper and the Irish soap series Fair City as Joshua Udenze.

Born in London, Michael was raised in the UK, Ireland, United States, and Nigeria. He studied at the Italia Conti Academy of Theatre Arts. He had also done theatre work.

== Filmography ==
=== Film ===
Year	Title	Role	Notes
2008	Mamma Mia!	Pepper	
2017	The Black Hole	Escorpion's Man	
2021	Trees of Peace	Hutu Soldier	

=== Television ===
Year	Title	Role	Notes
2001	The Nightmare Room	Alien	Episode: "Four Eyes"
2005–2015	Fair City	Joshua Udenze	422 episodes
2007	Crimewatch	Main suspect	Episode #24.4
2008	The Londoners	Jamaz / Jamaj	2 episodes
2014	Major Crimes	Normandie Gang Member	Episode: "Trial by Fire"
2015	The Late Late Show with James Corden	Afro Ninja	Episode: "Ben Kingsley/Bill Hader/Zac Efron"
2016	Jimmy Kimmel Live!	Hoverboard Zombie	Episode: "Ellen Pompeo/Norman Reedus/Yo Gotti & Travis Barker"
2018	Project Child: Origins	Cyber Agent	Episode: "Reflections"
2018	Luke Cage	The Mechanic	Episode: "On and On"
2018	Things Eternal	Tunde	Episode: "Crowns"
