= Anni-Frid Lyngstad discography =

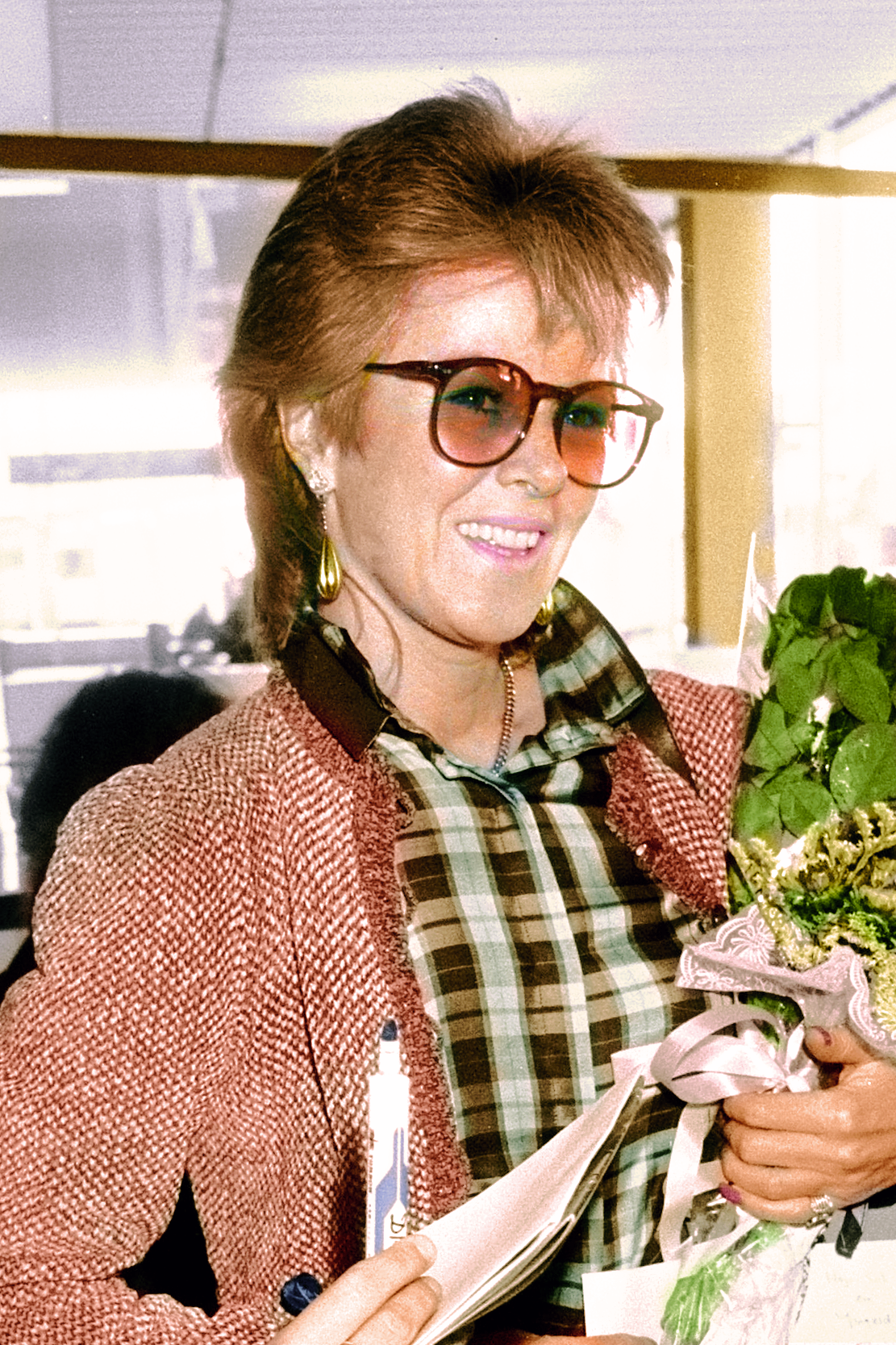
- At Amsterdam Airport Schiphol, 1982
- Studio albums: 5
- Compilation albums: 6
- Singles: 28
- Video albums: 1
- Music videos: 8

Swedish singer Anni-Frid Lyngstad has recorded five studio albums, six compilation albums, twenty-eight singles, five guest singles, a video album and eight music videos.

On 3 September 1967, after Lyngstad won a talent contest with a prize of record contract with EMI, she appeared on the television series "Hylands hörna". The Swedish division of EMI assigned her to the record label His Master's Voice and released her debut single "En ledig dag"; the song did not chart. A year later, EMI transferred her to EMI Columbia as a part of the earlier label's reorganisation into a classical record label. Among of her singles such as "Härlig är vår jord" managed to reach the Sverigetopplistan charts and land her into the 1969 Melodifestivalen competition, but she did not reach No. 1 on the music chart until she released her single "Min egen stad" on 1971, co-written by her then-boyfriend Benny Andersson with lyricist Peter Himmelstrand.

After her contract with EMI Columbia lapsed the same year, she was signed to the roster of Stig Anderson's label Polar Records and recorded "Man vill ju leva lite dessemellan" as her debut single for Polar Records. A year later, she joined the pop supergroup Björn Benny & Agnetha Frida (later ABBA) to record their debut single "People Need Love" and later the album "Ring Ring". Lyngstad briefly continued her solo career by recording her acclaimed solo album "Frida ensam" and her accompanying single "Fernando" in Swedish. Due to her commitment to ABBA, she did not release solo albums and singles until in 1982 and 1984, with "Something's Going On" and "Shine", produced by Genesis drummer Phil Collins and record producer Steve Lillywhite respectively. Her single "I Know There's Something Going On" from her 1982 album peaked at No. 13 on the Billboard Hot 100 in the United States.

Between 1985 and 1991, she relegated her career to being a guest singer, notably with "Så länge vi har varann" by Swedish pop group Ratata. She returned to her solo career in 1991 by recording charity singles and releasing her album "Djupa andetag" in 1996. The album charted at No. 1 on Sverigetopplistan. A follow-up album to the earlier was planned but was shelved, partly due to her daughter Ann Lise-Lotte Casper's death from complications from automobile accident the following year. Since the late 1990s, Lyngstad sporadically recorded several guest singles featuring artists such as Deep Purple keyboardist Jon Lord and jazz trumpeter Arturo Sandoval. She retired from live performing and touring and has since stated as of May 2017 in a Schweizer Radio interview that she has no intention to return to live performing other than studio recordings and guest appearances.

== Albums ==
=== Studio albums ===
List of albums, with selected chart positions and certifications
Title	Album details	Peak chart positions											Certifications
Title	Album details	SWE	AUS	AUT	DEN	FIN	GER	NL	NOR	SWI	UK	US	Certifications
Frida	Released: 31 March 1971; Label: Columbia; Formats: LP	28	—	—	—	—	—	—	—	—	—	—	
Frida ensam	Released: 10 November 1975; Label: Polar; Formats: LP	1	—	—	20	—	—	—	—	—	—	—	SWE: Platinum
Something's Going On	Released: 6 September 1982; Label: Polar; Formats: LP, cassette, CD	1	40	10	—	—	12	2	2	—	18	41	FIN: Gold; SWE: Gold; UK: Silver
Shine	Released: 11 September 1984; Label: Polar; Formats: LP, cassette, CD	6	—	—	—	—	49	19	10	29	67	—	
Djupa andetag	Released: 20 September 1996; Label: Anderson; Formats: CD, cassette	1	—	—	—	32	—	—	17	—	—	—	SWE: Platinum
"—" denotes releases that did not chart or were not released.

=== Compilation albums ===
List of compilation albums
Title	Album details
Anni-Frid Lyngstad	Released: 8 October 1972; Label: EMI; Formats: LP
På egen hand	Released: 1991; Label: EMI; Formats: CD
Tre kvart från nu	Released: 1993; Label: EMI; Formats: CD
Frida 1967-1972	Released: 13 October 1997; Label: EMI; Formats: CD
Frida – The Mixes (Remix album)	Released: 1998; Label: Tin Can Discs; Formats: CD

=== Box sets ===
List of box sets
Title	Album details
Frida – 4xCD 1xDVD	Released: 5 December 2005; Label: Polar Music; Formats: 5CD/DVD

== Singles ==
=== Swedish singles ===
List of singles, with selected chart positions, showing year released and album name
Year	A-side	B-side	Label	Charts peak	Svensktoppen entry	HP (peak position)	Album	Reference
1967	"En ledig dag"	"Peter kom tillbaka"	X 8691	—	"En ledig dag"	11	non-album song	
1967	"Din"	"Du är så underbart rar"	X 8700	—	"Din"	12	non-album song	
1967	"Din"	"Du är så underbart rar"	X 8700	—	"Du är så underbart rar"	13	non-album song	
1968	"Simsalabim"	"Vi möts igen"	DS 2392	—	"Simsalabim"	13	non-album song	
1968	"Simsalabim"	"Vi möts igen"	DS 2392	—	"Vi möts igen"	15	non-album song	
1968	"Mycket kär"	"När du blir min"	DS 2402	—	"När du blir min"	11	non-album song	
1969	"Räkna de lyckliga stunderna blott" (Alternative Version)	"Härlig är vår jord" (Alternative Version)	DS 2424 (Withdrawn)	—	—	—	non-album song	
1969	"Härlig är vår jord"	"Räkna de lyckliga stunderna blott"	DS 2431	—	"Härlig är vår jord"	8	non-album song	
1969	"Så synd du måste gå"	"Försök och sov på saken	DS 2438	—	"Så synd du måste gå"	15	non-album song	
1969	"Så synd du måste gå"	"Försök och sov på saken	DS 2438	—	"Försök och sov på saken"	12	non-album song	
1970	"Peter Pan"	"Du betonar kärlek lite fel"	DS 2460	—	"Du betonar kärlek lite fel"	15	non-album song	
1970	"Där du går lämnar kärleken spår"	"Du var främling här igår"	4E 006-34120 M	—	"Där du går lämnar kärleken spår"	9	non-album song	
1970	"Där du går lämnar kärleken spår"	"Du var främling här igår"	4E 006-34120 M	—	"Du var främling här igår"	12	non-album song	
1971	"En liten sång om kärlek"	"Tre kvart från nu"	4E 006-34311 M	—	"En liten sång om kärlek"	14	Frida	
1971	"En liten sång om kärlek"	"Tre kvart från nu"	4E 006-34311 M	—	"Tre kvart från nu"	14	Frida	
1971	—		4E 062–34360	—	"En ton av tystnad"	13	Frida	
1971	—		4E 062–34360	—	"Jag blir galen när jag tänker på dej"	13	Frida	
1971	"En kväll om sommarn"	"Vi vet allt, men nästan inget"	2053.040	—	"En kväll om sommarn"	9	non-album song	
1971	"En kväll om sommarn"	"Vi vet allt, men nästan inget"	2053.040	—	"Vi vet allt, men nästan inget"	11	non-album song	
1971	—		4E 062–34360	—	"Telegram till fullmånen"	12	Frida	
1971	"En gång är ingen gång"	"Min egen stad"	4E 006-34462 M	—	"Min egen stad"	1	non-album song	
1972	"Vi är alla bara barn i början"	"Kom och sjung en sång"	4E 006–34576	—	"Kom och sjung en sång"	14	non-album song	
1972	"Man vill ju leva lite dessemellan"	"Ska man skratta eller gråta"	POS 1161	—	"Man vill ju leva lite dessemellan"	1	non-album song	
1972	"Man vill ju leva lite dessemellan"	"Ska man skratta eller gråta"	POS 1161	—	"Ska man skratta eller gråta"	13	non-album song	
1976	"Fernando"	"Ett liv i solen"	POS 1221	—	"Fernando"	1	Frida ensam	
1987	"Så länge vi har varann" (with Ratata)	"Du finns hos mig" (Ratata)	TATI 3	5	"Så länge vi har varann" (with Ratata)	2	Mellan dröm och verklighet	
1992	"Änglamark" ^{[E]} (Artister för Miljö) (Artister för miljö)	"Saltwater"		—	—	—	non-album song	
1996	"Även en blomma"	—	SON 2	11	"Även en blomma"	5	Djupa andetag	
1996	"Ögonen"	—	SON 4	24	"Ögonen"	14	Djupa andetag	
1997	"Alla mina bästa år" (with Marie Fredriksson)	—	SON 8	54	"Alla mina bästa år" (with Marie Fredriksson)	10	Djupa andetag	
1997	"Alla mina bästa år" (Vinny Vero US remixes) (with Marie Fredriksson)	—	SON 9	—	—	—	Djupa andetag	
2003	"Lieber Gott" (with Dan Daniell)	"I Have A Dream" "Wenn ich dann gehen muss" (Dan Daniell)	BM 363–03–021	—	—	—	Liebe ist...	
"—" denotes releases that did not chart or were not released.

=== English singles ===
List of singles, with selected chart positions and certifications, showing year released and album name
Title	Year	Peak chart positions												Certifications	Album
Title	Year	SWE	AUS	AUT	BEL	CAN	FRA	GER	IRE	NL	NOR	UK	US	Certifications	Album
"I Know There's Something Going On"	1982	3	5	3	1	30	4	5	23	3 (Note: "I Know There’s Something Going On" peaked at 3 in the Dutch 40 singles chart.)	3	43	13 (Note: "I Know There’s Something Going On" peaked at 14 in the Cash Box singles chart.)	SWE: Gold	Something's Going On
"To Turn the Stone"	1982	—	—	—	9	—	—	39	—	8 (Note: "To Turn The Stone" peaked at 6 in the Dutch 40 singles chart.)	—	—	—		Something's Going On
"I See Red" ^{[A]}	1982	—	—	—	—	—	—	—	—	—	—	—	—		Something's Going On
"Tell Me It's Over" ^{[B]}	1982	—	—	—	—	—	—	—	—	—	—	—	—		Something's Going On
"Here We'll Stay"	1983	—	—	—	36	—	—	—	—	34 (Note: "Here We’ll Stay" did not chart in the Dutch 40 singles chart, but peaked in 10th place in the Tipparade (50).)	—	100	102		Something's Going On
"Belle" (with Daniel Balavoine)^{[C]}	1983	—	—	—	—	—	62	—	—	—	—	—	—		ABBAcadabra: Conte musical
"Time" (with B.A. Robertson)	1983	—	—	—	—	—	—	—	—	— (Note: The single did not chart in the Dutch Single Top 50 charts, but spent three weeks in the Single Tip chart.)	—	45	—		Non-album single
"Shine"	1984	6	—	—	9	—	—	51	—	19 (Note: "Shine" peaked at 23 in the Dutch 40 singles chart.)	—	82	—		Shine
"Twist in the Dark" ^{[C]}	1984	—	—	—	—	—	—	—	—	—	—	—	—		Shine
"Heart of the Country" ^{[D]}	1984	—	—	—	—	—		—	—	—	—	123	—		Shine
"Come to Me (I Am Woman)"	1984	—	—	—	—	—	—	—	—	— (Note: The single did not chart in the Dutch Single Top 50 charts, but spent one week in the Single Tip chart.)	—	—	—		Shine
"Saltwater" ^{[E]} (Artister för Miljö)	1992	—	—	—	—	—	—	—	—	—	—	—	—		Non-album single
"—" denotes releases that did not chart.

- A Released only in South Africa.
- B Released only in Japan.
- C Released only in France.
- D Released only in United Kingdom.
- E Double A-side with Swedish-language "Änglamark".

==== Promotional singles ====
List of promotional singles, showing year released and album name
Title	Year	Album
"The Sun Will Shine Again" (with Jon Lord)	2004	Beyond the Notes

=== Billboard Year-End charts ===
Year	Song	Year-End position
1983	"I Know There's Something Going On"	20

=== Spanish singles ===
List of Spanish singles, showing year released and album name
Title	Year	Album
"Andante, Andante" (with Arturo Sandoval)	2018	Ultimate Duets

=== As featured artist ===
List of singles as featured artist, showing year released and album name
Title	Year	Album
"1865" (Dan Daniell feat. Frida)	2015	Lebe Deinen Traum

=== Appearances ===
Year	Artist	Single and album track	Chart positions										Album
Year	Artist	Single and album track	SE	UK	AU	DE	DK	NL	US	FR	NO	Svensktoppen entry	Album
1971	Björn & Benny	"Det kan ingen doktor hjälpa"	-	-	-	-	-	-	-	-	-	9	non-album song
1971	Björn & Benny	"På bröllop"	-	-	-	-	-	-	-	-	-	9	non-album song
1971	Lill-Babs	"Välkommen till världen"	12	-	-	-	-	-	-	-	-	2	Välkommen till världen
1971	Björn & Benny	"Tänk om jorden vore ung"	-	-	-	-	-	-	-	-	-	1	non-album song
1971	Lena Andersson	"Jag kommer"	15	-	-	-	-	-	-	-	-	1	Lena
1971	Lena Andersson	"Glöm dej själv för en dag"	-	-	-	-	-	-	-	-	-	7	Lena
1971	Lena Andersson	"Tom tom kära vän"	-	-	-	-	-	-	-	-	-	11	Lena
1971	Lena Andersson	"Tänk om man bara kunde svara på frågor"	-	-	-	-	-	-	-	-	-	7	Lena
1971	Lena Andersson	"Vårnattsmelodi"	-	-	-	-	-	-	-	-	-	-	Lena
1971	Lena Andersson	"Världen som var min"	-	-	-	-	-	-	-	-	-	-	Lena
1971	Lena Andersson	"Skapelsens hemlighet"	-	-	-	-	-	-	-	-	-	-	Lena
1971	Agnetha Fältskog	"Tågen kan gå igen"	-	-	-	-	-	-	-	-	-	12	När en vacker tanke blir en sång
1971	Agnetha Fältskog	"Sången föder dig tillbaka"	-	-	-	-	-	-	-	-	-	10	När en vacker tanke blir en sång
1971	Agnetha Fältskog	"Dröm är dröm, och saga saga"	-	-	-	-	-	-	-	-	-	3	När en vacker tanke blir en sång
1971	Agnetha Fältskog	"Kanske var min kind lite het"	-	-	-	-	-	-	-	-	-	12	När en vacker tanke blir en sång
1972	Ted Gärdestad	"Helena"	-	-	-	-	-	-	-	-	-	-	Undringar
1972	Ted Gärdestad	"Ett stilla regn"	-	-	-	-	-	-	-	-	-	-	Undringar
1972	Ted Gärdestad	"När du kommer"	-	-	-	-	-	-	-	-	-	-	Undringar
1972	Ted Gärdestad	"Jag vill ha en egen måne"	-	-	-	-	-	-	-	-	-	-	Undringar
1972	Ted Gärdestad	"Snurra du min värld"	-	-	-	-	-	-	-	-	-	1	Undringar
1972	Ted Gärdestad	"Hela världen runt"	-	-	-	-	-	-	-	-	-	-	Undringar
1972	Björn & Benny, Agnetha & Anni-Frid	"People Need Love"	17	-	-	-	-	-	-	-	-	-	Ring Ring
1972	Björn & Benny, Agnetha & Anni-Frid	"Åh vilka tider"	-	-	-	-	-	-	-	-	-	6	Non-album track
1972	Anni-Frid Lyngstad	"När det lider mot jul"	-	-	-	-	-	-	-	-	-	-	När juldagsmorgon glimmar (Various artists)
1972	Anni-Frid Lyngstad	"Gläns över sjö och strand"	-	-	-	-	-	-	-	-	-	-	När juldagsmorgon glimmar (Various artists)
1973	Ted Gärdestad	"Gitarren och jag"	-	-	-	-	-	-	-	-	-	-	Ted
1973	Ted Gärdestad	"Oh, vilken härlig da'"	-	-	-	-	-	-	-	-	-	10	Ted
1973	Ted Gärdestad	"Kaliforniens guld"	-	-	-	-	-	-	-	-	-	-	Ted
1973	Ted Gärdestad	"Jag ska fånga en ängel"	-	-	-	-	-	-	-	-	-	-	Ted
1973	Ted Gärdestad	"Come Give Me Love"	-	-	-	-	-	-	-	-	-	-	Ted
1974	Ted Gärdestad	"Buffalo Bill"	-	-	-	-	-	-	-	-	-	-	Upptåg
1974	Ted Gärdestad	"Love Comes"	-	-	-	-	-	-	-	-	-	-	Upptåg
1974	Ted Gärdestad	"Silver"	-	-	-	-	-	-	-	-	-	-	Upptåg
1974	Ted Gärdestad	"Fantomen"	-	-	-	-	-	-	-	-	-	-	Upptåg
1974	Ted Gärdestad	"Eiffeltornet"	-	-	-	-	-	-	-	-	-	9	Upptåg
1975	Harpo	"Moviestar" (English version)	1	24	3	1	1	2	-	16	1	-	Moviestar
1975	Harpo	"Moviestar" (Swedish version)	1	-	-	-	-	-	-	-	-	1	
1975	Harpo & Bananaband	"Pin-Up Girl"	-	-	-	-	-	-	-	-	-	-	Harpo & Bananaband
1975	Agnetha Fältskog	"Var det med dej?"	-	-	-	-	-	-	-	-	-	-	Elva Kvinnor I Ett Hus
1975	Björn Skifs	"Med varann"	-	-	-	-	-	-	-	-	-	-	Schiffz!
1975	Björn Skifs	"Ni som kan ro"	-	-	-	-	-	-	-	-	-	-	Schiffz!
1976	Magnus Lindberg	"Ljusterö"	-	-	-	-	-	-	-	-	-	-	Magnus Lindberg
1976	Michael B. Tretow	"Paper Dolls"	-	-	-	-	-	-	-	-	-	-	Let's Boogie
1976	Michael B. Tretow	"Sandwich"	-	-	-	-	-	-	-	-	-	-	Let's Boogie
1976	Michael B. Tretow	"Bottom Coming Up"	-	-	-	-	-	-	-	-	-	-	Let's Boogie
1976	Michael B. Tretow	"Hesitating Hanna"	-	-	-	-	-	-	-	-	-	-	Let's Boogie
1976	Michael B. Tretow	"Robot Man"	-	-	-	-	-	-	-	-	-	-	Let's Boogie
1976	Michael B. Tretow	"Doc McGurgle's Babylonian Lizard Tooth Oil"	-	-	-	-	-	-	-	-	-	-	Let's Boogie
1976	Michael B. Tretow	"That's The Way The Cookie Crumbles"	-	-	-	-	-	-	-	-	-	-	Let's Boogie
1976	Michael B. Tretow	"I Can See What You Mean"	-	-	-	-	-	-	-	-	-	-	Let's Boogie
1976	Michael B. Tretow	"Moonbeams"	-	-	-	-	-	-	-	-	-	-	Let's Boogie
1976	Michael B. Tretow	"Brief Intermission"	-	-	-	-	-	-	-	-	-	-	Let's Boogie
1976	Ted Gärdestad	"Chapeau claque"	-	-	-	-	-	-	-	-	-	3	Franska kort
1976	Ted Gärdestad	"Franska kort"	-	-	-	-	-	-	-	-	-	-	Franska kort
1976	Ted Gärdestad	"Kejsarens kläder"	-	-	-	-	-	-	-	-	-	-	Franska kort
1976	Ted Gärdestad	"Klöversnoa"	-	-	-	-	-	-	-	-	-	-	Franska kort
1976	Ted Gärdestad	"Humbuggie-Woogie"	-	-	-	-	-	-	-	-	-	-	Franska kort
1976	Ted Gärdestad	"Ring ding dingeling dae (sagan om riddaren i kung leijonhiertas hov)"	-	-	-	-	-	-	-	-	-	-	Franska kort
1977	Clabbe	"Here Comes The Lonely Night"	-	-	-	-	-	-	-	-	-	-	Starlight
1977	Clabbe	"Disco Shack"	-	-	-	-	-	-	-	-	-	-	Starlight
1977	Clabbe	"Annabel"	-	-	-	-	-	-	-	-	-	-	Starlight
1977	Clabbe	"Stone Heart Song"	-	-	-	-	-	-	-	-	-	-	Starlight
1977	Clabbe	"Cinderella"	-	-	-	-	-	-	-	-	-	-	Starlight
1977	Clabbe	"Fanclub On The Moon"	-	-	-	-	-	-	-	-	-	-	Starlight
1977	Clabbe	"Me And You Tonight"	-	-	-	-	-	-	-	-	-	-	Starlight
1978	Kjerstin Dellert	"O, min Carl Gustaf"	-	-	-	-	-	-	-	-	-	2	Carl Gustaf "Skillingtryck och gamla kända visor"
1979	Finn Kalvik	"På flukt"	-	-	-	-	-	-	-	-	-	-	Kom ut kom fram
1979	Finn Kalvik	"Alle som blir igen"	-	-	-	-	-	-	-	-	-	-	Kom ut kom fram
1979	Finn Kalvik	"Alene"	-	-	-	-	-	-	-	-	-	-	Kom ut kom fram
1979	Finn Kalvik	"Senit"	-	-	-	-	-	-	-	-	-	-	Kom ut kom fram
1979	Finn Kalvik	"Skogens sang"	-	-	-	-	-	-	-	-	-	-	Kom ut kom fram
1979	Clabbe	"An Evening In Paris"	-	-	-	-	-	-	-	-	-	-	Non-album song
1980	Tomas Ledin	"Lookin’ For A Good Time"	-	-	-	-	-	-	-	-	-	-	Lookin’ For A Good Time
1980	Tomas Ledin	"The Sun Shinin’ In The Middle Of The Night"	-	-	-	-	-	-	-	-	-	-	Lookin’ For A Good Time
1980	Finn Kalvik	"On The Run"	-	-	-	-	-	-	-	-	-	-	Non-album song
1980	Finn Kalvik	"Wake Up To Love"	-	-	-	-	-	-	-	-	-	-	Non-album song
1981	Ted Gärdestad	"Låt kärleken slå rot"	-	-	-	-	-	-	-	-	-	5	Stormvarning!
1981	Mireille Mathieu	"Bravo tu as gagné"	14	-	-	-	-	-	-	7	-	-	Bravo tu as gagné
1981	Finn Kalvik	"Aldri i livet"	-	-	-	-	-	-	-	-	3	-	Natt Og Dag
1981	Finn Kalvik	"I jomfruens tegn"	-	-	-	-	-	-	-	-	-	-	Natt Og Dag
1981	Finn Kalvik	"Natt og dag"	-	-	-	-	-	-	-	-	-	-	Natt Og Dag
1981	Finn Kalvik	"Refrenger"	-	-	-	-	-	-	-	-	-	-	Natt Og Dag
1981	Finn Kalvik	"Velkommen farvel"	-	-	-	-	-	-	-	-	-	-	Natt Og Dag
1981	Finn Kalvik	"Here In My Heart"	-	-	-	-	-	-	-	-	-	-	Natt Og Dag
1983	Adam Ant	"Strip"	-	41	-	-	-	-	42	-	-	-	Strip
1984	Daniel Balavoine	"Dieu que c’est beau"	-	-	-	-	-	-	-	29	-	-	Au Palais Des Sports
1984	ABBAcadabra	"L’étoile filante"	-	-	-	-	-	-	-	-	-	-	La Fusée De Noé
1988	Mauro Scocco	"Vem är han"	-	-	-	-	-	-	-	-	-	7	Mauro Scocco
2002	Filippa Giordano	"La Barcarolle"	-	-	-	-	-	-	-	-	-	-	Il Rosso Amore
"—" denotes releases that did not chart or were not released.

== Videography ==
=== Video album ===
Title	Video details
Frida – The DVD	Released: 5 December 2005; Label: Polar; Formats: DVD

=== Music videos ===
Year	Title	Album
1982	"I Know There's Something Going On"	Something's Going On
1982	"To Turn the Stone"	Something's Going On
1982	"I See Red"	Something's Going On
1982	"Here We'll Stay"	Something's Going On
1984	"Shine"	Shine
1984	"Twist in the Dark"	Shine
1996	"Även en blomma"	Djupa andetag
1996	"Ögonen"	Djupa andetag
