= It's Nice to Be Back =

1967 song by Hep Stars

"It’s Nice To Be Back"

Single by Hep Stars

from the album Hep Stars, 1964-69!
- A-side: "Malaika"
- Released: April 1967
- Recorded: April 1967
- Studio: Europafilm, Stockholm
- Genre: Pop
- Length: 2:33
- Label: Olga
- Songwriter: Benny Andersson
- Producer: Gert Palmcrantz

"It's Nice to Be Back" is a song written by Benny Andersson and originally released by the Hep Stars. It was released as the B-side to their non-album single "Malaika" in April 1967, and was later released on their compilation album, Hep Stars, 1964-69!, in 1982. The song would later be covered by Anni-Frid Lyngstad of ABBA (a band Hep Stars members Benny Andersson and Björn Ulvaeus are also a part of) and released as the second and final single for her debut studio album Frida, released in March 1971.

== Background ==
In 1967, The Hep Stars made their feature film, titled Habari Safari, which shot in Nairobi but was never completed. Two songs resulted from this project: "Malaika" and "It's Nice to Be Back". The latter was intended for the closing song for the Hep Stars movie, upon their return to Stockholm. "Malaika" was released as a single and "It's Nice to Be Back" was the B-Side.

== Anni-Frid Lyngstad version ==
"Min Egen Stad"

Single by Anni-Frid Lyngstad

from the album Frida
- Language: Swedish
- English title: My Own Town
- A-side: "En Gång Är Ingen Gång"
- Released: 9 August 1971
- Recorded: 12 July 1971
- Studio: EMI, Stockholm
- Genre: Pop
- Length: 3:00
- Label: Columbia
- Composer: Benny Andersson
- Lyricist: Peter Himmelstrand
- Producer: Benny Andersson

Anni-Frid Lyngstad singles chronology
"En Kväll Om Sommarn" (1971)	"Min Egen Stad" (1971)	"Vi Är Alla Bara Barn I Början / Kom Och Sjung En Sång" (1972)

"It's Nice to Be Back" received a Swedish translation by Peter Himmelstrand titled "Min Egen Stad" (Translation: My Own Town) recorded by Anni-Frid Lyngstad, who alongside Andersson was a member of ABBA. Andersson produced the recording.

"Min Egen Stad" was recorded in the EMI Studios, Stockholm on 12 July 1971 alongside "En Gång Är Ingen Gång". A new backing track, which was more pop-oriented was recorded with the same tempo. Including Lyngstad and Andersson, all four ABBA members provided their backing vocals, resulting in the chorus being boosted by the energetic backing vocals. The strings and horn had been overdubbed on 23 July 1971. On 9 August 1971, "En Gång Är Ingen Gång" was released with "Min Egen Stad" on the B-Side, mistakingly titled "I Min Egen Stad". (Translation: In My Own Town).

This error was corrected on 18 August 1971. By this point, success was around the corner. Lyngstad had been performing in the Lasse Berghagen Show until 29 August 1971, receiving positive feedback. On 10 August 1971, Lyngstad's duet with Lasse Berghagen "En Kväll Om Sommarn" entered the Svensktoppen chart in 9th place, as well as Lyngstad's songs from her debut album “bubbling under” in the Toppentipset charts throughout August. "Min Egen Stad" appeared in the Toppentipset charts on 3 October 1971 in 14th place and 17 October 1971 in 16th place before shooting up to the Svensktoppen charts in 3rd place the following week. On 7 November 1971, "Min Egen Stad" peaked in first place. This gave Lyngstad a self-confidence boost.

Due to the success, a picture sleeve was released with just the title "Min Egen Stad". Lyngstad's debut album Frida was re-released on 19 November 1971, with "Min Egen Stad" opening the B-Side of the album. Lyngstad's compilation Anni-Frid Lyngstad was also released on 27 November 1971, with both "Min Egen Stad" and "En Gång Är Ingen Gång" included.

== Track listing ==
7” single (4E 006-34462 M)

A. "En Gång Är Ingen Gång"

B. "Min Egen Stad"

== Charts ==
Chart (1971)	Peak position
Sweden (Svensktoppen)	1
