= Härslöv =

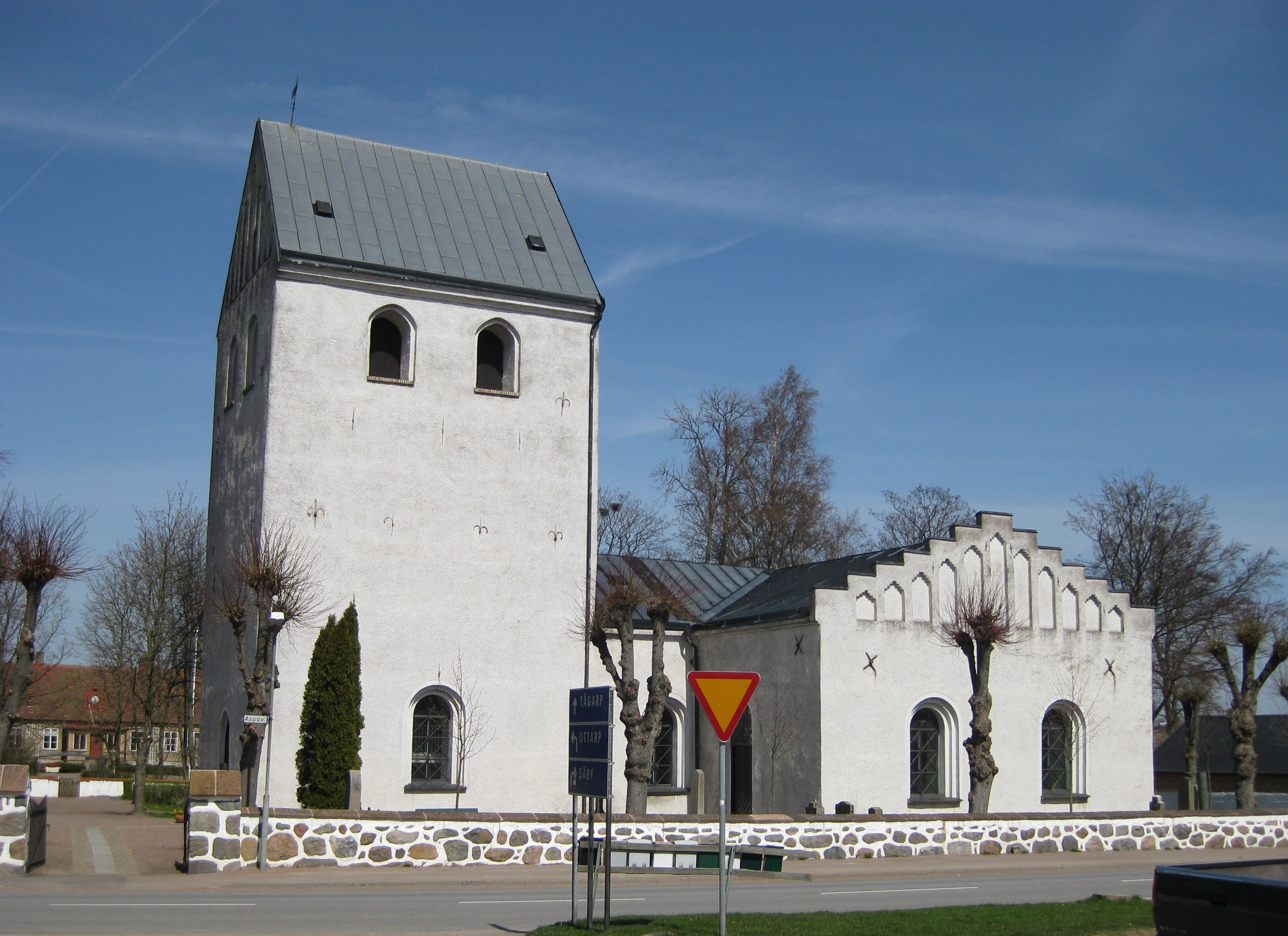
- Härslöv Church

- Location within Skåne Location within Sweden
- Coordinates: 55°56′N 12°52′E
- Country: Sweden
- Province: Skåne
- County: Skåne County
- Municipality: Landskrona Municipality

Area
  - Total: 0.36 km^{2} (0.14 sq mi)

Population (31 December 2010)
  - Total: 382
  - Density: 1,073/km^{2} (2,780/sq mi)
- Time zone: UTC+1 (CET)
  - Summer (DST): UTC+2 (CEST)

Härslöv is a locality situated in Landskrona Municipality, Skåne County, Sweden with 382 inhabitants in 2010. The medieval Härslöv Church contains fragmentary Romanesque wall paintings and a richly decorated pulpit from the 17th century.

Härslöv is also the name of a district in Landskrona municipality which encompasses some parts of the Landskrona urban area.
