= Anni-Frid Lyngstad (album) =

Compilation album by Anni-Frid Lyngstad
- Released: 1971
- Length: 34:51
- Label: Emidisc
- Producer: Olle Bergman; Benny Andersson

Anni-Frid Lyngstad chronology
Frida (1971)	Anni-Frid Lyngstad (1971)	Frida ensam (1975)

Singles from Anni-Frid Lyngstad
- 1. "En Gång Är Ingen Gång/Min Egen Stad" Released: August 1971

Anni-Frid Lyngstad is a compilation album of songs recorded by Anni-Frid Lyngstad, released by Emidisc in 1971, after Lyngstad ended her five-year contract with EMI's Swedish division. All songs on this album are included in the EMI compilation album Frida 1967-1972.

== Background ==
=== Overview ===
The same year in 1971 that Lyngstad had had her first Svensktoppen number one, "Min Egen Stad", a Swedish language version 1.2

of the Hep Stars track "It's Nice To Be Back Again", she did not renew her contract with EMI,[1] and was signed to Polar Music to record her first single with the latter independent label.[1] The expiration allowed EMI to release the compilation album, Anni-Frid Lyngstad, under EMI's budget label, Emidisc.

=== Content ===
The album opens with "Min Egen Stad" and "En Gång Är Ingen Gång", the B and A-side of Lyngstad's penultimate single, respectively, whereas the ultimate single she recorded was, 'Vi är alla bara barn i början', which was not included on this compilation album, for the EMI label before signing with Polar Music, both produced by Benny Andersson and with backing vocals by all four future ABBA members.

== Track listing ==
Side 1

1. "Min Egen Stad" (Benny Andersson, Peter Himmelstrand) - 3:00
2. "En Gång Är Ingen Gång" ("There Goes My Everything") (Dallas Frazier, Stikkan Anderson) - 2:46
3. "Försök Och Sov På Saken" ("Surround Yourself with Sorrow") (Bill Martin, Phil Coulter, Bo-Göran Edling) - 2:40
4. "Peter Pan" (Benny Andersson, Björn Ulvaeus) - 2:09
5. "Räkna De Lyckliga Stunderna Blott" (Jules Sylvain, Karl-Ewert) - 2:38
6. "Där Du Går Lämnar Kärleken Spår" ("Love Grows (Where My Rosemary Goes)") (Barry Mason, Tony Macaulay, Olle Bergman) - 2:43

Side 2

1. "Härlig Är Vår Jord" (Ivan Renliden) - 2:42
2. "Peter Kom Tillbaka" ("Junge, Komm Bald Wieder") (Lotar Olias, Olle Bergman) - 3:07
3. "Simsalabim" (Gunnar Sandevärn) - 2:30
4. "En Ledig Dag" ("Weekend in Portofino") (Matteo Chiosso, Bruno De Filippi, Bengt Sten) - 2:55
5. "Du Är Så Underbart Rar" ("Can't Take My Eyes Off You") (Bob Crewe, Bob Gaudio, B.S. Bimen) - 3:17
6. "Så Synd Du Måste Gå" ("Comment te dire adieu?"|"It Hurts To Say Goodbye") (Jack Gold, Arnold Golan, Stikkan Anderson) - 2:24

== Sources ==
- Carl Magnus Palm: ABBA - The Complete Recording Sessions, Century 22 Limited UK, 1994. ISBN 0-907938-10-8
- Liner notes CD compilation Frida 1967-1972, EMI Music Sweden 1997.
