= Frida – The Mixes =

Frida - The Mixes

Remix album by Frida
- Released: 1998
- Recorded: 1996–1997
- Genre: Pop
- Length: 35:35
- Label: Tin Can Discs
- Producer: Anders Glenmark

Frida chronology
Frida 1967–1972 (1997)	Frida - The Mixes (1998)	Frida – 4xCD 1xDVD (2005)

Frida – The Mixes is a remix album by Swedish singer Anni-Frid Lyngstad, under the name of Frida, from her 1996 album Djupa andetag. This album was released exclusively in Germany in 1998. It was compiled by Stefan Bürger who was keen of the idea providing the mixes used, as bonus tracks to fans outside Sweden.

== Track listing ==
All tracks written by Anders Glenmark. Track 1 and 6 remixed by Vinny Vero, Track 2 remixed by John Amatiello and Martin Pihl, Track 3-7 remixed by Anders Glenmark.

No.	Title	Length
1.	"Alla mina bästa år" (Hasbrouck Heights Single Mix)	4:59
2.	"Ögonen" (Lemon Mix)	4:34
3.	"Även en blomma" (6:34 Version)	6:34
4.	"Alla Mina Bästa År" (Mix Adagio)	5:03
5.	"Ögonen" (4:23 Version)	4:23
6.	"Alla Mina Bästa År" (TV Track)	4:59
7.	"Alla Mina Bästa År" (Adagio Instrumental)	5:03

== See also ==
- Djupa andetag
