= Ögonen =

1996 song by Anni-Frid Lyngstad

Single by Frida

from the album Djupa andetag
- B-side: "Ögonen (Lemon Mix); Ögonen (Version)"
- Released: October 1996
- Recorded: 1996
- Length: 4:18
- Label: Anderson Records
- Lyricist(s): Anders Glenmark

Frida singles chronology
"Även En Blomma" (1996)	"Ögonen" (1996)	"Alla Mina Bästa År" (1997)

"Ögonen" is a song recorded by ABBA member, Anni-Frid Lyngstad, for her 1996 solo album, Djupa andetag.

The song was written by Anders Glenmark, who produced the album. It was intended for "Ögonen" to be a song that was "sexy, from a mature woman's perspective". The final version of the lyrics was about the intimacy and sensuality of a couple which related to Frida's relationship with her husband Heinrich Ruzzo Prinz Reuss von Plauen.

The single was released in October 1996, with two remixes: one was the "Ögonen (Lemon Mix)" by John Amatiello and Martin Pihl and another, titled "Ögonen (Version)" by Glenmark. Glenmark had originally asked Soundfactory to produce remixes for the songs on the album but due to their unavailability, this resulted in Glenmark producing the latter remix. "Ögonen" spent one week in the Swedish charts, reaching No. 24.

== Track listing ==
CD single

1. "Ögonen (Album)" - 4:18
2. "Ögonen (Lemon mix)" - 4:34
3. "Ögonen (Version)" - 4:23

== Charts ==
Chart (1996)	Peak position
Sweden (Sverigetopplistan)	24
