= Heinrich Ruzzo Prinz Reuss von Plauen =

- Count of Plauen
- Heinrich Ruzzo with Anni-Frid Lyngstad in 1992
- Born: 24 May 1950; Lucerne, Switzerland
- Died: 29 October 1999 (aged 49); Stockholm, Sweden
- Burial: 11 November 1999; Härslöv Church
- Spouse: Mette Rinde (1974–1986) Anni-Frid Lyngstad (m. 1992)
- Issue: Princess Henriette Reuss of Plauen; Princess Pauline Reuss of Plauen
- House: Reuss
- Father: Heinrich Enzio Prinz Reuss, Count of Plauen
- Mother: Louise Peyron

Heinrich Ruzzo Prinz Reuss von Plauen (German: Heinrich Ruzzo Prinz Reuß von Plauen; 24 May 1950 – 29 October 1999) was a Swiss-born Swedish landscape architect and a member of the formerly sovereign House of Reuss. His branch ruled the Principality of Reuss-Gera until 1918. Until his death, he was married to ABBA singer Anni-Frid Lyngstad, his second wife.

== Biography ==
Born on 24 May 1950 in Lucerne, Heinrich Ruzzo was the son of Heinrich Enzio Reuss-Plauen (1922–2000) and a Swedish mother, Baroness Louise Peyron (1918–1989), daughter of Baron Gustaf Peyron and Emma Kockum. The Peyrons had immigrated to Sweden from France in 1740, been ennobled in Sweden in 1825, granted a barony in 1841 and were received into the Swedish House of Nobility the following year. Louise Peyron was an artist. His father, Heinrich Enzio, was the son of Count Heinrich Harry of Plauen (1890-1951), who was himself the son of Prince Heinrich XXVI Reuss (1857–1913).

Although only a younger son of a minor royal family, when Heinrich XXVI married Countess Viktoria von Fürstenstein (1863–1949) in 1885, under the strict marriage rules then enforced by the Reuss dynasty their children were not allowed to bear the princely title, being designated "Counts of Plauen" instead, while still in the line of succession to the throne of Reuss (The Fürstensteins lacked Uradel status: Viktoria's paternal grandfather, Pierre-Alexandre Le Camus 1774–1824, son of a French laborer residing in Martinique, became foreign minister in Jerome Bonaparte's Kingdom of Westphalia, was ennobled there in 1807 and made a count of the French Empire in 1817).

When the German Empire collapsed at the end of World War I, the reigning Prince Reuss lost his crown along with all the other monarchs whose realms were within Germany. In 1927, Heinrich XXVI's childless brother, Prince Heinrich XXX (1864–1939), adopted his nephew and the now-deposed dynasty agreed to accept him as "Prince Heinrich Harry Reuß", along with those of his male-line descendants born of unions complying with the family's 1902 rules that permitted marriages to countesses (Heinrich Harry's wife, Huberta von Tiele-Winckler was only a baroness in her own right, but belonged to a family of comital rank in Prussia). Their son Heinrich Enzio was thus accepted by the House of Reuss as a prince, but his own marriage to Baron Peyron's daughter in 1949 occurred before the Reuss family conference of 1957 which lowered the marital standard again, allowing dynastic inter-marriage with baronial families.

Strictly, therefore, since 1996 the House of Reuss recognized Prince Heinrich Ruzzo Reuss by that title, but without official membership in the dynasty or entitlement to the traditional style of Serene Highness, while in German law since 1919 the title is not recognized and is allowed only as part of the surname, thus "Heinrich Ruzzo Prinz Reuss".

Called by the Italian name "Ruzzo" within the family, he grew up with his paternal grandfather in Rome, but spent the summers with his mother in Scania. In February 1954, his parents divorced; in October his father remarried Countess Fedora von Pückler-Groditz and with her fathered Marina Carolina (born 1964) and Heinrich Patrick (born 1966), both graphic artists. In 1972, his mother remarried nobleman Theodor "Ted" Ankarcrona, owner of the estate Boserup in Scania and Runsa Castle in Uppland.

Heinrich Ruzzo was educated in Sweden, obtaining a degree in architecture, where he became a friend of the future King Carl XVI Gustaf of Sweden, subsequently his occasional hunting companion.

Later in life, he relocated to Switzerland, where he lived at his family castle in Fribourg. In 1989, his mother died and he inherited her farm in Glumslöv outside Landskrona. He constructed golf courses on his properties in Switzerland and Sweden.

== Marriages and children ==
Heinrich Ruzzo was married to Mette Rinde, a native of Norway, from 1974 to 1986, and they had twin daughters:

- Henriette Reuss of Plauen (born 2 June 1977 in Oslo), married Jan Herud, a German businessman
- Pauline Margaretha Emma-Louise Mette Reuss (born 2 June 1977 in Oslo)

From 1986, Heinrich Ruzzo lived with Norwegian-Swedish singer Anni-Frid Lyngstad, a member of ABBA, in Switzerland. They married on 26 August 1992.

== Death ==
Heinrich Ruzzo died from lymphoma in 1999, aged 49, in Stockholm.
