= Änglamark =

Single by Artister För Miljö
- English title: Angel land
- B-side: "Saltwater"
- Released: July 1992
- Recorded: June 1992
- Length: 4:35
- Label: Det Naturliga Steget
- Producer(s): Hans Gardemar

Frida singles chronology
"Så Länge Vi Har Varann" (1987)	"Änglamark" (1992)	"Även En Blomma" (1996)

"Änglamark" is a Swedish song composed and written by Evert Taube for the movie The Apple War (Äppelkriget) in 1971. The song is sung in the movie's opening and ending credits by the composer's son, Sven-Bertil Taube. Instrumental variations of the song are used as a leitmotif throughout the movie.

The original recording by Sven-Bertil Taube was on the Svensktoppen "Top 10" for 16 weeks in 1972. In 2021, the song charted at number 18 on Sverigetopplistan's Heatseeker chart.

== Covers ==
Since 1972 over 40 cover versions of the song have been recorded.

Paul Britten Austin translated the lyrics into English and this version, "Where Angels Tread", was recorded by Roger Whittaker in 1972.

In 1992, the group and organisation Artister För Miljö, was formed, including ABBA-member, Anni-Frid Lyngstad, the chairwoman of the organisation and bandleader, Roxette member, Marie Fredriksson, Tomas Ledin, and Håkan Hagegård to raise awareness to environmental issues. The song was recorded by the group in June 1992 and released in the second week of July 1992. The song was performed as the last song of Musik på Borggarden, an environmental gala on 14th August 1992 as a grand finale.
