= Frida 1967–1972 =

Compilation album by Anni-Frid Lyngstad
- Released: 27 October 1997
- Recorded: 11 September 1967 – 10 January 1972
- Genre: Pop; folk; schlager
- Length: 111:43
- Label: EMI Svenska
- Producer: Benny Andersson; Olle Bergman; Lars Berghagen

Anni-Frid Lyngstad chronology
Djupa andetag (1996)	Frida 1967–1972 (1997)	Frida – The Mixes (1998)

Frida 1967–1972 is a compilation album by Swedish singer Anni-Frid Lyngstad, released in 1997 by EMI Sweden. The album features Lyngstad's anthology of her solo recordings prior to ABBA, which includes the A and B sides of ten 7" singles, and rare television and radio performances from this period, as well as her debut album, Frida.

== Background ==
On 3 September 1967, Anni-Frid "Frida" Lyngstad won the national Swedish song contest "New Faces", arranged by record company EMI and held at Skansen, Stockholm. The first prize was a recording contract with EMI Sweden. A secret for the winner, not known to Frida, was to perform the song live in a major TV show the same evening. This happened on the same day Sweden went from driving on the left hand to the right hand.

That Sunday evening in September 1967, Frida sang her winning song "En ledig dag" in the TV show. Her first TV appearance caused a big sensation that many record companies and composers got in touch with Frida. EMI started to fear they might lose their new singer; on the next morning, EMI drove all the way from Stockholm to the town Eskilstuna and ended up in Frida's home with the recording contract for her to sign. EMI producer Olle Bergman said that "We got so interested and fond of her, and I thought she had everything a person needs to become something".

During these early years, Lyngstad did many other radio and TV recordings in Sweden. Various performances can be found in Frida – The DVD, but they are not included in Frida 1967-1972. She spent five years at EMI Sweden before switching to the Polar Music label and joining Benny Andersson, Björn Ulvaeus, and Agnetha Fältskog to form ABBA in 1972.

On 11 September 1967, Frida went to Europa Film Studio in Stockholm and recorded "En ledig dag" with Marcus Österdahl orchestra, which was done in one take. The same day, she also recorded the B-side, "Peter kom tillbaka", (Peter Come Back). Among all the songs here is her 1969 entry for Melodifestivalen 1969 with "Härlig är vår jord", where she finished fourth. Her first studio album Frida was also included in this compilation, which was produced by her then fiancé Benny Andersson, as well as her first No. 1 hit in Sweden with "Min egen stad", (My Own Town) in the Svensktoppen chart.

This release also includes clips from the press and critics from the time the songs and album were first released. Frida received welcoming praise from the critics, who especially noted the precision and versatility of Frida as a singer. The box set contains pictures of all the singles releases, and alternative photo shots which were never seen before. The bonus tracks on this compilation were recorded for TV.

The Frida 1967-1972 compilation saw the CD debut of the rare duet single "En kväll om sommar'n"/"Vi vet allt men nästan inget", (One Summer Evening/We Know Everything But Almost Nothing) with Lars Berghagen, recorded in the spring of 1971 to promote a Swedish summer tour in the folkparks, originally released on the Polydor label.

The live version of "Barnen sover", (The Children Are Sleeping) was recorded on 29 September 1970 for the radio show, Våra favoriter (Our Favourites). This was the very first public appearance of Anni-Frid Lyngstad, Agnetha Fältskog, Björn Ulvaeus and Benny Andersson as a quartet, shortly before their 'Festfolket' tour.

== Reception ==
Professional ratings
Review scores
Source	Rating
Allmusic	3.5/5 stars
The Encyclopedia of Popular Music	3/5 stars

Frida 1967-1972 was released in 1997 by EMI Records. Writing for AllMusic, Bruce Eder lauded the compilation album and observed that Anni-Frid Lyngstad was set up to be "Sweden's answer to Petula Clark" by her management, and deemed the earlier, "thicker" music production a poor fit; however, Eder was more favourable to Benny Andersson's "airy and open, light-textured yet distinctive" production works with Lyngstad.

== Track listing ==
Disc one
No.	Title	Writer(s)	Original song and notes	Length
1.	"En ledig dag"	Matteo Chiosso, Bruno De Filippi, Bengt Sten	Weekend in Portofino; non-album single	2:55
2.	"Peter kom tillbaka"	Lotar Olias, Olle Bergman	Junge, komm bald wieder; non-album single	3:07
3.	"Din"	Gonzalo Roig, Jerico	Quiereme mucho; non-album single	2:39
4.	"Du är så underbart rar"	Bob Crewe, Bob Gaudio, B.S. Bimen	Can't Take My Eyes Off You; non-album single	3:17
5.	"Simsalabim"	Gunnar Sandevärn	N/A; non-album single	2:30
6.	"Vi möts igen"	Bradford Craig, Ty Whitney, Bengt Haslum	Where Are They Now?; non-album single	3:18
7.	"Mycket kär"	Daniele Pace, Mario Panzeri, Lorenzo Pilat, Stikkan Anderson	Non illuderti mai; non-album single	2:25
8.	"När du blir min"	Nathaniel Shilkret, Olle Bergman	The Lonesome Road; non-album single	2:09
9.	"Härlig är vår jord"	Ivan Renliden	N/A; non-album single	2:42
10.	"Räkna de lyckliga stunderna blott"	Jules Sylvain, Karl-Ewert	N/A; non-album single	2:38
11.	"Så synd du måste gå"	Jack Gold, Arnold Golan, Stikkan Anderson	Comment te dire adieu? / It Hurts To Say Goodbye; non-album single	2:24
12.	"Försök och sov på saken"	Bill Martin, Phil Coulter, Bo-Göran Edling	Surround Yourself with Sorrow; non-album single	2:40
13.	"Peter Pan"	Benny Andersson, Björn Ulvaeus	N/A; non-album single	2:09
14.	"Du betonar kärlek lite fel"	Peter Himmelstrand	N/A; non-album single	2:29
15.	"Där du går lämnar kärleken spår"	Barry Mason, Tony Macaulay, Olle Bergman	Love Grows (Where My Rosemary Goes); non-album single	2:43
16.	"Du var främling här igår"	Clive Westlake, Patrice Hellberg	I Close My Eyes And Count To Ten; non-album single	3:32
17.	"Tre kvart från nu"	Anton Rubinstein, Peter Himmelstrand	Melody in F; recorded for the album Frida (1971)	3:14
18.	"Jag blir galen när jag tänker på dej"	Teddy Randazzo, Robert Weinstein, Stikkan Anderson	Goin' Out of My Head; recorded for the album Frida (1971)	3:27
19.	"Lycka"	Björn Ulvaeus, Benny Andersson, Stikkan Andersson	N/A; recorded for the album Frida (1971)	2:59
20.	"Sen dess har jag inte sett 'en"	Trad. arr. Claes Rosendahl, Lars Berghagen	N/A; recorded for the album Frida (1971)	2:10
Total length:				55:27

Disc two
No.	Title	Writer(s)	Original song and notes	Length
1.	"En ton av tystnad"	Paul Simon, Owe Junsjö	The Sound of Silence; recorded for the album Frida (1971)	3:58
2.	"Suzanne"	Leonard Cohen, Owe Junsjö	Same title; recorded for the album Frida (1971)	4:07
3.	"Allting skall bli bra" / "Vad gör jag med min kärlek?"	Tim Rice, Andrew Lloyd Webber, Owe Junsjö	Everything's Alright / I Don't Know How to Love Him; recorded for the album Frida (1971)	6:14
4.	"Jag är beredd"	Paul Leka, Denise Gross, Stikkan Anderson	And I'll Be There; recorded for the album Frida (1971)	2:38
5.	"En liten sång om kärlek"	Sylvia Fine, Lars Berghagen	Five Pennies Saints; recorded for the album Frida (1971)	2:25
6.	"Telegram till fullmånen"	Cornelis Vreeswijk, Georg Riedel	Same title; recorded for the album Frida (1971)	1:59
7.	"Barnen sover"	Peter Himmelstrand	N/A; recorded for the album Frida (1971)	3:35
8.	"En kväll om sommar'n"	Phil Ochs, Lars Berghagen	Changes; duet with Lars Berghagen	2:08
9.	"Vi vet allt, men nästan inget"	Lars Berghagen	N/A; duet with Lars Berghagen	3:32
10.	"Min egen stad"	Benny Andersson, Peter Himmelstrand	N/A; non-album single	3:00
11.	"En gång är ingen gång"	Dallas Frazier, Stikkan Anderson	There Goes My Everything; non-album single	2:46
12.	"Vi är alla bara barn i början"	Benny Andersson, Björn Ulvaeus	N/A; non-album single	3:12
13.	"Kom och sjung en sång"	Carole King, Toni Stern, Stikkan Andersson	No Sad Song; non-album single	3:43
14.	"Att älska i vårens tid"	Gunnar Nystroem, Gösta Rybrant	N/A; bonus track	2:41
15.	"Ole lukköje"	Ingrid Almqvist, Ingemar Malmström	N/A; bonus track	1:50
16.	"Vad gör det att vi skiljs för i afton"	Nils Jolinder, Karl-Ewert	N/A; bonus track	2:18
17.	"Min soldat"	Nils Perne	N/A; bonus track	2:30
18.	"Barnen sover"	Peter Himmelstrand	N/A; bonus track, live	3:40
Total length:				41:57

== Production ==
Personnel

- Olle Bergman – producer (disc one: tracks 1–12)
- Benny Andersson – producer (disc one: tracks 13–16, disc two: tracks 1–7, 10–13)
- Lars Berghagen – producer (disc two: tracks 8, 9)

Production notes

- Disc two, tracks 14–17 from Sveriges Radio's TV-show När stenkakan slog, broadcast in 1970
- Disc two, track 18 from Sveriges Radio's radio show Våra favoriter, broadcast in 1970
