= Kjerstin Dellert =

Swedish opera singer

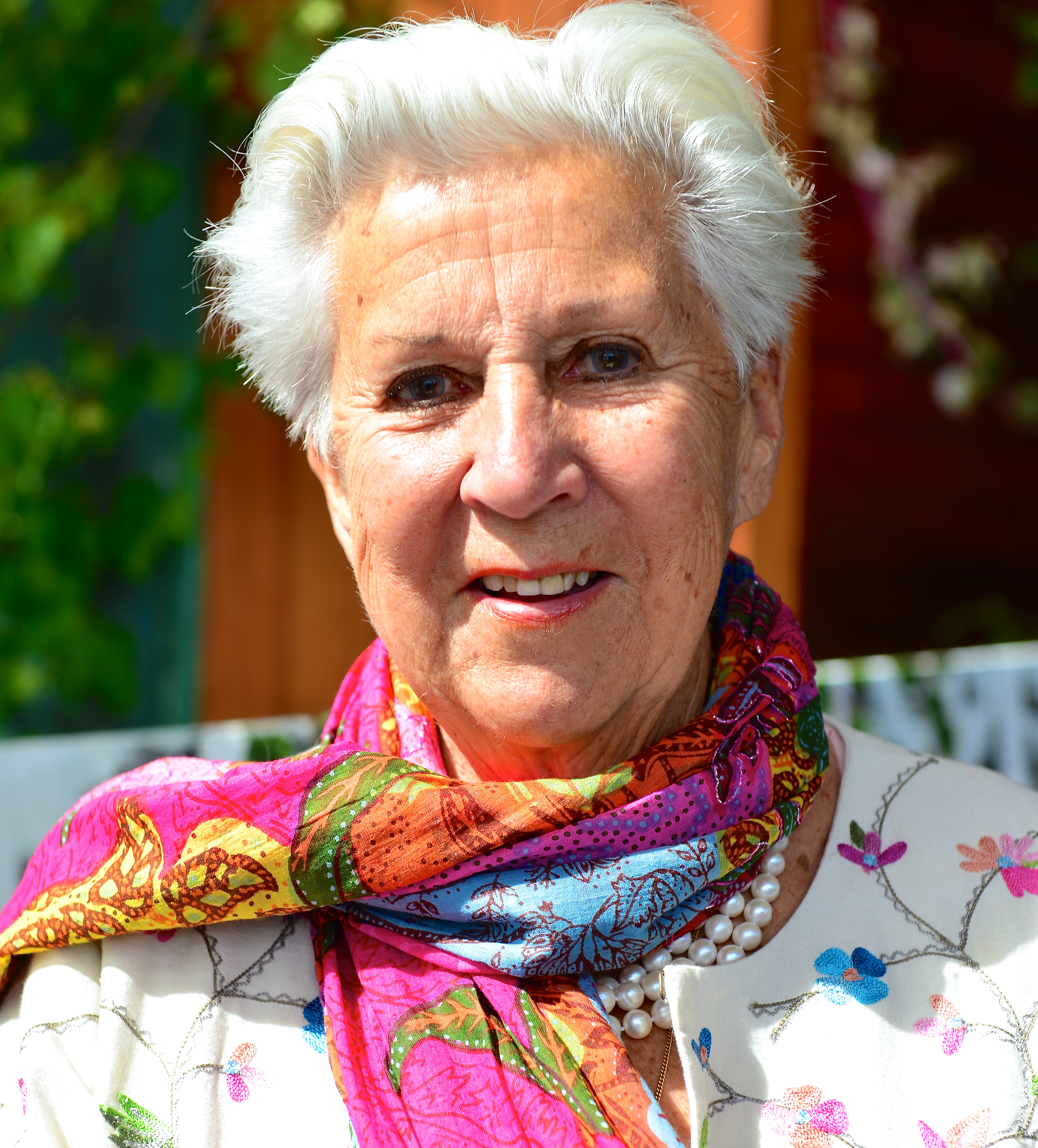
- Kjerstin Dellert in June 2013

Background information
- Born: 4 November 1925; Stockholm, Sweden
- Died: 5 March 2018 (aged 92)
- Genre: Opera
- Occupation: Singer
- Years active: 1948–2015

Kjerstin Dellert (4 November 1925 – 5 March 2018) was a Swedish opera singer and theater manager.

== Life ==
=== Early life ===
Born in Stockholm, Dellert made her opera debut at Stora teatern (the old Gothenburg Opera stage) in Gothenburg in the 1950s.

=== Vocalist career ===
Her career as a vocalist had begun when she won an Arthur Godfrey's Talent Scouts contest in 1948 with Someone to Watch Over Me.

From the mid-1950s to the 1970s she worked primarily at the Royal Swedish Opera in Stockholm in a variety of opera roles, including Floria in Puccini's Tosca and Harry Martinson/Erik Lindegren/Karl-Birger Blomdahl's opera Aniara in 1959.

Dellert was also the initiator and producer of a few gala shows for particular celebrations, such as the show financed by Sweden's Parliament and given in 1976 at the Stockholm Opera for the wedding of King Carl Gustaf and Queen Silvia (where ABBA first performed Dancing Queen and she performed O, min Carl Gustaf) and a review at Södra teatern for her own 50th birthday in 1975. At the latter, she summarized with a Swedish version of My Way, describing her own life till then with lyrics by Lars Jacob; the words were updated by him so that Dellert could use it for her last recording in 2015 for her 90th birthday, produced by Emil Eikner.

She dubbed the singing voice of Eva Dahlbeck for the role of Helena in the film Sköna Helena (1951). She participated in Melodifestivalen 1972 with "Kärlek behöver inga ord", finishing fourth.

=== Other activities ===
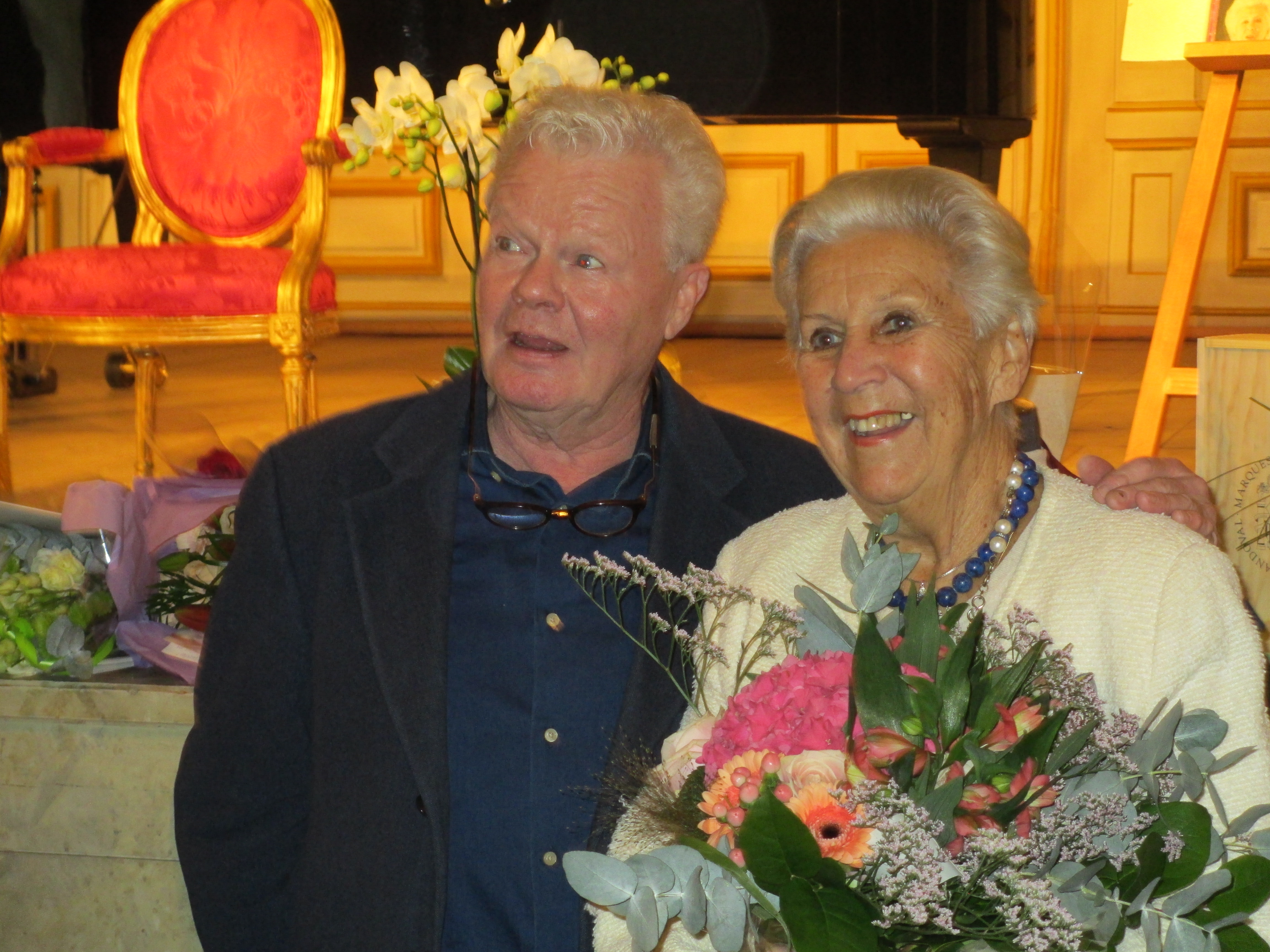
Dellert at Confidencen with husband Häggbom during her 90th birthday tribute in 2015

Dellert was the managing director of the Ulriksdal Palace Theatre Confidencen. Since the mid-1990s she has been retired from the stage, officially retired from the Swedish Royal Opera since 1979, but briefly in 2005 made a critically acclaimed appearance as Maria Callas in the play Master Class by Terrence McNally at Confidencen and Lorensbergsteatern in Gothenburg.

=== Personal life ===
In her first marriage Dellert was the mother of artist and entertainment personality Thomas Dellert, her only child.

=== Awards ===
Dellert was awarded the Illis quorum by the Swedish government in 1994.

== Illness and death ==
On Christmas Eve 2016 Dellert suffered a stroke. She died at home on 5 March 2018, aged 92, in the presence of Nils-Åke Häggbom, her husband since 1968.
