= Frida: The DVD =

- Produced by: Mats Jankell
- Starring: Anni-Frid Lyngstad
- Narrated by: Anni-Frid Lyngstad
- Edited by: Lotta Jankell, Micke Eklind
- Production company: Polar Music
- Distributed by: Universal Music Group
- Release date: 5 December 2005 (Europe)
- Running time: 3:25:00 (total)
- Country: Sweden
- Languages: Swedish, English

Frida: The DVD is a Swedish documentary film that covers the singing career of Anni-Frid Lyngstad, also known as Frida, one of the four members of Swedish pop group ABBA, on her life from her beginning days as a dansband singer through her ABBA years and to her post-ABBA years. Produced by interviewer Mats Jankell, the DVD was released by Universal on 5 December 2005.

== Synopsis ==
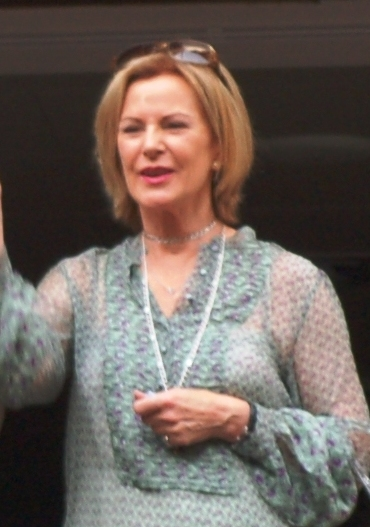
Lyngstad in 2008

Producer Mats Jankell's interview with Anni-Frid Lyngstad was filmed on 22 July 2005, in the Swiss restaurant, Chez Vrony, at Zermatt, Switzerland, accompanied with the background of the Matterhorn.

Frida reminisces about her entire career, her private life, her audience, her friends and about the person she is today. From her television debut in 1967 with "En Ledig Dag" (A Day Off), to the television performances she made in Germany, in 2004, performing "The Sun Will Shine Again", together with keyboardist Jon Lord of the English hard rock group, Deep Purple. Frida describes her singing technique, stage performances, and studio work. She explains how songs were recorded and performed. In the accompanying clips, there is rare footage that shows Lyngstad singing jazz and schlager numbers recorded for Sveriges Television (SVT). Frida also speaks about ABBA and how she and Agnetha Fältskog developed as singers as ABBA's recordings grew more and more complex over the years.

A one-hour TV-documentary about the recording and making of the album Something's Going On is included in this DVD. SVT filmed the whole recording process from day one in the studio to the release party, when the album was completed. This program includes interviews with Lyngstad, producer and drummer Phil Collins, ABBA colleagues Björn Ulvaeus and Benny Andersson, as well as most of the musicians that contributed and took part in the recording.

The DVD also contains other promotional clips of Frida in her international solo period, after ABBA informally disbanded in 1982, and a television documentary about the making and recording of her 1996 album Djupa andetag (Deep Breaths), produced by Anders Glenmark, titled Frida: mitt i livet (Frida: Middle of Life). The television documentary includes studio footage, behind the scenes of the music video of the single "Även En Blomma" ("Even a flower"), and the filming of Frida in her Spanish house in Mallorca, where the photo sessions of Djupa andetag were taken at.

== Frida: 4×CD 1×DVD ==
Frida: The DVD was simultaneously released as Frida: 4×CD 1×DVD, a boxed set combining the DVD with her albums Frida ensam, Something's Going On, Shine, and Djupa andetag on CD.

== See also ==
- Frida 1967–1972
- Anni-Frid Lyngstad discography
- ABBA discography
