= Så länge vi har varann =

Single by Ratata and Frida

from the album Mellan Dröm Och Verklighet
- English title: As long as we have each other
- B-side: "Du finns hos mig"
- Released: 20 January 1987
- Recorded: December 1986
- Length: 4:38
- Label: Record Station
- Producer(s): Johan Ekelund, Mauro Scocco

Frida singles chronology
"Twist In The Dark" (1984)	"Så länge vi har varann" (1987)	"Änglamark / Saltwater" (1992)

"Så länge vi har varann" is a single released by Swedish band Ratata and Frida in 1987. It reached number five in Sweden (Sverigetopplistan). It also spent 21 weeks in the top ten of the Svensktoppen chart, reaching a highest position of number two on 7 June 1987. An English version, "As Long as I Have You", was also released.

"As Long As I Have You"

Song by Ratata and Frida
- A-side: "Om Du Var Här"
- Released: 3 June 1987
- Recorded: February 1987
- Length: 4:42
- Label: The Record Station
- Producer(s): Johan Ekelund, Mauro Scocco

== Music video ==
Both Swedish and English versions had music videos produced on the 25–27 February 1987.
