= Frida (album) =

Studio album by Anni-Frid Lyngstad
- Released: March 1971
- Recorded: 8 September 1970 – 15 January 1971
- Studio: EMI, Stockholm
- Genre: Pop; folk rock
- Length: 35:46
- Label: Columbia; Parlophone
- Producer: Benny Andersson

Anni-Frid Lyngstad chronology
Frida (1971)	Anni-Frid Lyngstad (1972)

Reissue cover
- 1974 re-release EMI:s Stjärnserie Vol. 7

Singles from Frida
- 1. "En liten sång om kärlek" Released: January 1971; 2. "Min egen stad" Released: August 1971

Frida is the debut studio album by Swedish singer Anni-Frid Lyngstad, released in March 1971 by EMI Columbia. Recorded between September 1970 and January 1971, Frida was produced by her then-fiancé, Benny Andersson. Frida was her only album recorded for EMI during her contract, not counting her eponymous compilation album from 1972, before being signed to Polar and forming the pop group ABBA, a year later.

The album received positive receptions from critics, both retrospectively and at the time of the album's release, but did not chart, with the exception of her non-album single from the same year, "Min egen stad", until Frida charted in Sweden, in April 2017 with a limited edition reissue, reaching No. 28 on Sverigetopplistan's album charts. Frida has since been reissued several times by EMI and Parlophone since the original issue of the album.

== Background ==
=== Recording session ===
Frida commenced its recording session at EMI Studios, Stockholm, now known as X-Level Studios, on 8 September 1970 and was completed on 15 January 1971. Claes Rosendahl and Bengt Palmers both directed the conduction of the orchestra for the respective tracks for Frida.

"Min egen stad" was recorded on 12 July 1971 with Andersson, Björn Ulvaeus and Agnetha Fältskog on uncredited backing vocals, and was completed 11 days later. Lyngstad's cover version of The Beatles' "The Long and Winding Road" from the recording session of Frida remained unreleased, but was shared on YouTube in 2013.

=== Aftermath ===
By the time of the album's release, Lyngstad had been signed to EMI, for four years, since she won a song contest titled 'New Faces' and appeared on a Swedish television show, Hylands Hörna (Hyland's Corner), in September 1967. Not long after the release of the album, in 1972, Lyngstad did not renew her contract with EMI, and was signed to Polar Music to record her first single for the independent Swedish record label, and eventually team up with Andersson, Ulvaeus, and Fältskog to form ABBA. As a result, it is the only album Lyngstad has recorded, under her contract with EMI, as she has made non-album singles between 1967 and 1972.

== Release and reception ==
Professional ratings
Review scores
Source	Rating
Allmusic	link
The Encyclopedia of Popular Music	2/5 stars

"Min egen stad"
18 second excerpt from 'Min egen stad', sung by Anni-Frid Lyngstad. This song was her first No. 1 hit in Svensktoppen on 24 October 1971.

Frida was released in March 1971 by EMI Columbia. The album did not chart, but received welcoming praise from the critics, who noted the precision and versatility of Lyngstad as a singer. Dagens Nyheter described Frida as a "professional, sure and certain LP-debut ... low key but self-sure personality with sprinkles of both temperament, humor and tenderness. And she sings in this way that you understand she's got something between her ears - she sings with others words in a very intelligent way". After Lyngstad had her first No. 1 non-album single, "Min egen stad", in the Swedish weekly record chart, Svensktoppen on 24 October 1971, Frida was reissued the following year, with the song as the opening track of side two of the album.

The Svensktoppen version of Frida was given a second release in 1974 as a compilation under the name EMI:s Stjärnserie Vol. 7 (EMI's Star Series). Frida was out of print until EMI released a compilation album, Frida 1967–1972 in 1997, which includes all tracks from this album. As the reissue was met with positive receptions again, Bruce Eder, writing for AllMusic, described Lyngstad's vocals as "a distinctly expressive and pure instrument" with "Andersson's lean yet creative accompaniments", while noting that "one can begin to hear the attributes that would emerge on the early ABBA recordings".

Frida was reissued as a limited edition 180-gram vinyl, pressed between 1500 and 3000 copies on 22 April 2017, under the label Parlophone, who currently holds the rights to Lyngstad's recordings with EMI, coinciding the tenth anniversary of Record Store Day. Frida reached No. 28 on Sverigetopplistan's album charts, a few days after the reissue of this album.

== Track listing ==
=== Standard edition ===
Side one
No.	Title	Writer(s)	Length
1.	"Tre kvart från nu ("Three Quarters from Now")" (Melodi för Piano Op. 3:1 F-Dur)	Anton Rubinstein, Peter Himmelstrand	3:14
2.	"Jag blir galen när jag tänker på dej ("I Get Crazy When I Think of You")" ("Goin' Out of My Head")	Teddy Randazzo, Robert Weinstein, Stig Anderson	3:27
3.	"Lycka" ("Happiness" / "Luck")	Benny Andersson, Björn Ulvaeus, Anderson	2:59
4.	"Sen dess har jag inte sett'en"	Traditional; arranged by Claes Rosendahl and Lars Berghagen	2:08
5.	"En ton av tystnad" ("The Sound of Silence")	Paul Simon, Owe Junsjö	4:00
6.	"Suzanne"	Leonard Cohen, Junsjö	3:07

Side two
No.	Title	Writer(s)	Length
1.	"Allting skall bli bra" ("Everything Will Be Good"/"Everything's Alright"): "Vad gör jag med min kärlek" ("What Do I Do With My Love"/"I Don't Know How to Love Him")"	Tim Rice, Andrew Lloyd Webber, Junsjö	6:14
2.	"Jag är beredd ("I'm Ready")" ("And I'll Be There")	Paul Leka, Denise Gross, Anderson	2:38
3.	"En liten sång om kärlek ("A Little Song About Love")" ("Five Pennies Saints")	Sylvia Fine, Berghagen	2:25
4.	"Telegram för fullmånen" ("Telegraph for Full Moon")	Cornelis Vreeswijk	1:59
5.	"Barnen sover" ("The Children Sleeping")	Himmelstrand	3:35

=== Svensktoppen reissue edition ===
Side one
No.	Title	Writer(s)	Length
1.	"Tre kvart från nu" (Melodi för Piano Op. 3:1 F-Dur)	Anton Rubinstein, Peter Himmelstrand	3:14
2.	"Jag blir galen när jag tänker på dej" ("Going Out of My Head")	Teddy Randazzo, Robert Weinstein, Stig Anderson	3:27
3.	"Lycka"	Benny Andersson, Björn Ulvaeus, Anderson	2:59
4.	"Sen dess har jag inte sett 'en"	Traditional; arranged by Claes Rosendahl and Lars Berghagen	2:08
5.	"En ton av tystnad" ("The Sound of Silence")	Paul Simon, Owe Junsjö	4:00
6.	"Suzanne"	Leonard Cohen, Junsjö	3:07

Side two
No.	Title	Writer(s)	Length
1.	"Min egen stad" ("My Own Town")	Andersson, Himmelstrand	3:00
2.	"Allting skall bli bra" ("Everything's Alright"): "Vad gör jag med min kärlek" ("I Don't Know How to Love Him")"	Tim Rice, Andrew Lloyd Webber, Junsjö	6:14
3.	"Jag är beredd" ("And I'll Be There")	Paul Leka, Denise Gross, Anderson	2:38
4.	"En liten sång om kärlek" ("Five Pennies Saints")	Sylvia Fine, Berghagen	2:25
5.	"Telegram för fullmånen"	Cornelis Vreeswijk	1:59
6.	"Barnen sover"	Himmelstrand	3:35

== Personnel ==
Personnel per Carl Magnus Palm and EMI Records.

=== Musicians ===
- Anni-Frid Lyngstad – lead and backing vocals
- Benny Andersson – piano, backing vocals on "Min egen stad" (uncredited) (Note: While Carl Magnus Palm's source indicates that all ABBA members contributed to vocals, the original EMI Columbia issue of the album, Frida, does not indicate the credits of the ABBA members (except Benny Andersson, who, according to the credits, contributed only in playing the piano, and producing the album.) on vocals.)
- Björn Ulvaeus – backing vocals on "Min egen stad" (uncredited)
- Agnetha Fältskog – backing vocals on "Min egen stad" (uncredited)
- Gus Horn – bass
- Bengt Palmers (sv) – guitars
- Thore Swanerud – piano on "Tre kvart från nu" and "En liten sång om kärlek"
- Knud Jörgensen – piano, organ
- John Cuonz – drums, percussion

=== Production ===
- Benny Andersson – producer
- Bengt Palmers – conductor and arranger on "Min egen stad", "En ton av tystnad", and "Jag är beredd"
- Claes Rosendahl (sv) – conductor and arranger on all tracks
- Björn Norén – engineer

== Charts ==
Chart (2017)	Peak position
Swedish Albums (Sverigetopplistan)	28
