= Härslöv Church =

- Härslövs kyrka
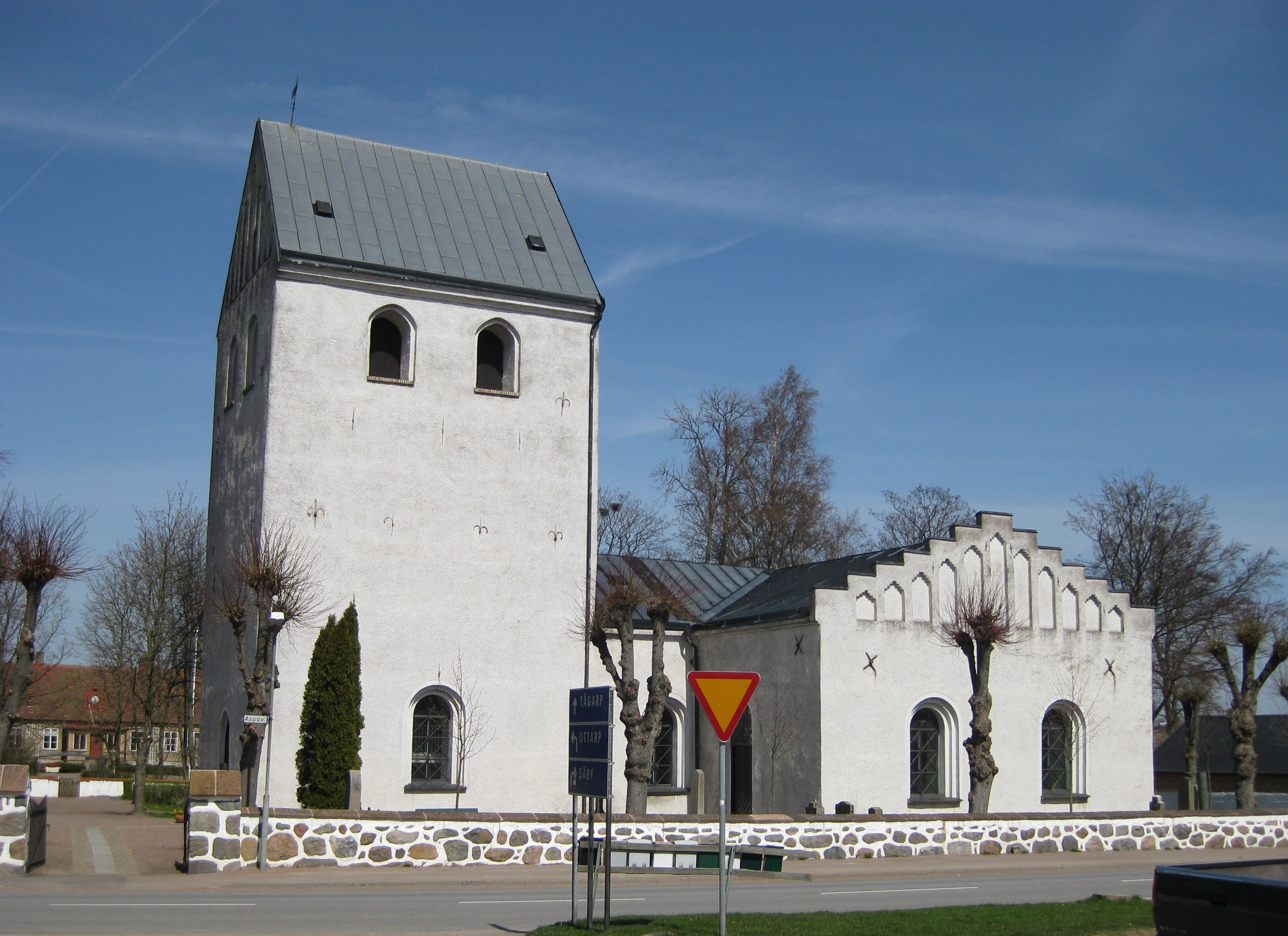
- Härslöv Church

- 55°55′57″N 12°52′25″E
- Country: Sweden
- Denomination: Church of Sweden

Härslöv Church (Swedish: Härslövs kyrka) is a medieval church in Härslöv, Scania, Sweden. It belongs to the Church of Sweden. The medieval church has been successively rebuilt and altered during the centuries. It was pillaged during the wars between Sweden and Denmark in the 17th century. The apse contains fragments of medieval mural paintings and the church has a richly decorated pulpit from the 17th century.

== History and architecture ==
Härslöv Church is one of the oldest churches in Scania, and was built c. 1100. The church originally consisted of a nave, a chancel and a tower. The apse was added slightly later. Later during the Middle Ages the tower was rebuilt, two church porches added and the church ceiling replaced with vaults. During the wars between Denmark and Sweden in the 17th century, the church was pillaged and its medieval furnishings lost. The north church porch was demolished in 1680. The church was repaired in the 18th century and further changes took place in the 19th century. The south church porch was demolished in 1830, and during the same time the windows were replaced. Between 1849 and 1850 a north transept was added, followed in 1856–58 by a south transept. These additions were designed by Carl Georg Brunius. The weatherwane of the church carries the year 1891, when the church was repaired. A major restoration was carried out in 1978, when the Romanesque murals were uncovered and restored.

== Murals and furnishings ==
The apse of Härslöv Church contains fragmentary Romanesque murals from the second half of the 12th century. They depict Christ in Majesty and the symbols of the Four Evangelists. There are also ornamental paintings on the apse arch and further paintings above the vaults, i.e. currently not visible.

The oldest of the church furnishings is the lavishly decorated pulpit. It contains depictions of the evangelists Lucas and Marcus as well as coats of arms. The altarpiece of the church is decorated with a painting by Danish artist Christian Thørrestrup. The church has two church bells; the oldest 1778 and the other was made in Stockholm in 1825.
