= Även en blomma =

- Single cover

Single by Frida

from the album Djupa andetag
- B-side: "Även en blomma" (6:34 version)
- Released: 21 August 1996
- Recorded: 1996
- Genre: Pop; alternative
- Length: 4:36
- Label: Anderson
- Songwriter: Anders Glenmark
- Producer: Anders Glenmark

Frida singles chronology
"Änglamark / Saltwater" (1992)	"Även en blomma" (1996)	"Ögonen" (1996)

"Även en blomma" is a song by the Swedish singer Anni-Frid Lyngstad, recorded for her fifth studio album Djupa andetag (1996). The single was written and produced by Anders Glenmark. It was released on 21 August 1996, as the lead single from the album. It charted moderately in Sweden, peaking at number 11 on the Sverigetopplistan chart, and also charted on the Svensktoppen for four weeks between 28 September and 19 October 1996.

== Charts ==
=== Weekly charts ===
Chart (1996)	Peak position
Sweden (Sverigetopplistan)	11

=== Year-end charts ===
Chart (1996)	Position
Sweden (Topplistan)	92
