= Djupa andetag =

Studio album by Frida
- Released: 20 September 1996
- Recorded: 18 March – 9 August 1996
- Studio: Polar Studios, Stockholm; Sveriges Radios Studio, Stockholm; Cirkus, Stockholm
- Genre: Adult contemporary; pop
- Length: 47:32
- Language: Swedish
- Label: Anderson; Polar (2005 reissue)
- Producer: Anders Glenmark

Frida chronology
| Shine (1984) | Djupa andetag (1996) | Frida 1967–1972 (1997) |

Singles from Djupa andetag
- 1. "Även en blomma" Released: 21 August 1996; 2. "Ögonen" Released: October 1996; 3. "Alla mina bästa år" Released: c. January 1997

Djupa andetag (English: Deep Breaths) is the fifth album by Swedish singer Anni-Frid "Frida" Lyngstad. It was released exclusively in the Scandinavian region by Anderson Records on 20 September 1996. Tracks from this album, "Alla Mina Bästa År", "Ögonen" and "Även En Blomma", have been remixed for Frida – The Mixes. As of 2025, the album remains Frida's final studio album.

== Overview ==
=== Comeback and recording session ===
As chairperson for the Swedish organisation, "Det Naturliga Steget-Artister För Miljön" ("The Natural Step-Artists For The Environment"), Frida decided to record a mature album with lyrics dealing with "inner personal environment" and the nature's surroundings. Frida's composition, "Kvinnor Som Springer" ("Women Who Run"), was inspired by the book "Women who Run with the Wolves", by Clarissa Pinkola Estes. This is one of only a few songs in her career that Frida has written herself.

At the time of recording, Frida did not want the attention an international release would bring, but she also felt for singing in her mother tongue again. She asked Agnetha Fältskog to record "Alla mina bästa år" with her, but Fältskog declined citing fear of ABBA reunion rumours. Recorded in the Swedish language, the recording sessions took place from 18 March to 9 August 1996 in numerous studios in Stockholm including Polar Studios, Sveriges Radio Studio and Cirkus. A one-hour documentary of the making, video clips and recording of the album (titled 'Frida – mitt i livet') was broadcast on Sveriges Television. It is also available on the DVD set, Frida – The DVD, including interviews with Frida and producer Anders Glenmark.

=== Reception ===
Professional ratings
Review scores
| Source | Rating |
|---|---|
| AllMusic | link |

Djupa andetag was met with a favorable reception, with critics citing the theme and Lyngstad's approach to singing on the album as positives. Critic Bruce Eder of AllMusic has praised Lyngstad for her 'relatively low-wattage' voice, the content and her vocal style on the album as 'more expressive and personal than any of her singing on those earlier records', as well as noting that it was a mature step for the singer and commenting, on her singing's volume, that 'less is more'.

== Track listing ==
Track listing
| No. | Title | Writer(s) | Length |
|---|---|---|---|
| 1. | "Älska mig alltid" | Anders Glenmark, Ture Rangström | 4:33 |
| 2. | "Ögonen" | Glenmark | 4:18 |
| 3. | "Även en blomma" | Glenmark | 4:36 |
| 4. | "Sovrum" | Glenmark | 3:47 |
| 5. | "Hon fick som hon ville" | Glenmark | 4:36 |
| 6. | "Alla mina bästa år" (Duet with Marie Fredriksson) | Glenmark | 4:41 |
| 7. | "Lugna vatten" | Glenmark, Leif Larson | 3:27 |
| 8. | "Vem kommer såra vem ikväll" | Glenmark, Fred Johansson | 4:32 |
| 9. | "Sista valsen med dig" | Glenmark | 5:29 |
| 10. | "Kvinnor som springer" | Glenmark, Anni-Frid Lyngstad | 4:46 |
| Total length: | | | 47:32 |

== Personnel ==
According to Anderson Records:

Musicians

- Frida – lead and backing vocals
- Anders Glenmark – backing vocals, guitar, keyboards, bass guitar, mellotron, drum programming
- Marie Fredriksson – vocals on Alla mina bästa år
- Karin Glenmark – backing vocals
- Katarina Nordström – backing vocals
- Christer Jansson – drums, percussion
- Stefan Olsson, Bass (tr 7)
- Johan Lindström – guitar
- Jonas Isacsson – guitar and twelve-string guitar
- SNYKO [Stockholms Nya Kammarorkester] – strings

Production

- Anders Glenmark – producer
- Åsa Winzell – mastering
- Lennart Östlund – engineer
- Anders Hägglöf – assistant engineer
- Mia Lorentzson – assistant engineer

== Charts ==
Weekly chart performance for "Djupa andetag"
| Chart (1996–1997) | Peak position |
|---|---|
| European Albums (Music & Media) | 40 |
| Finnish Albums (Suomen virallinen lista) | 32 |
| Norwegian Albums (VG-lista) | 17 |
| Swedish Albums (Sverigetopplistan) | 1 |

== Certifications ==
| Region | Certification | Certified units/sales |
|---|---|---|
| Sweden (GLF) | Gold | 50,000^{^} |
^{^} Shipments figures based on certification alone.
