= O, min Carl Gustaf =

Song by August Svensson
- Language: Swedish
- Released: 1906
- Genre: popular music
- Label: Skandinaviska Grammophon
- Songwriter: Emil Norlander

O, min Carl Gustaf is a song written by Emil Norlander, which in 1901 appeared in the revue "I sjunde himlen". It was recorded by August Svensson in 1906.

The song was also performed by Kjerstin Dellert when the Swedish royal couple married in 1976, then referring to king Carl XVI Gustaf of Sweden, and her version was released as a record in 1978. Her recording even charted at Svensktoppen for 11 weeks between 4 June-13 August 1978, peaking at second position.
