= Härlig är vår jord =

1969 single by Anni-Frid Lyngstad

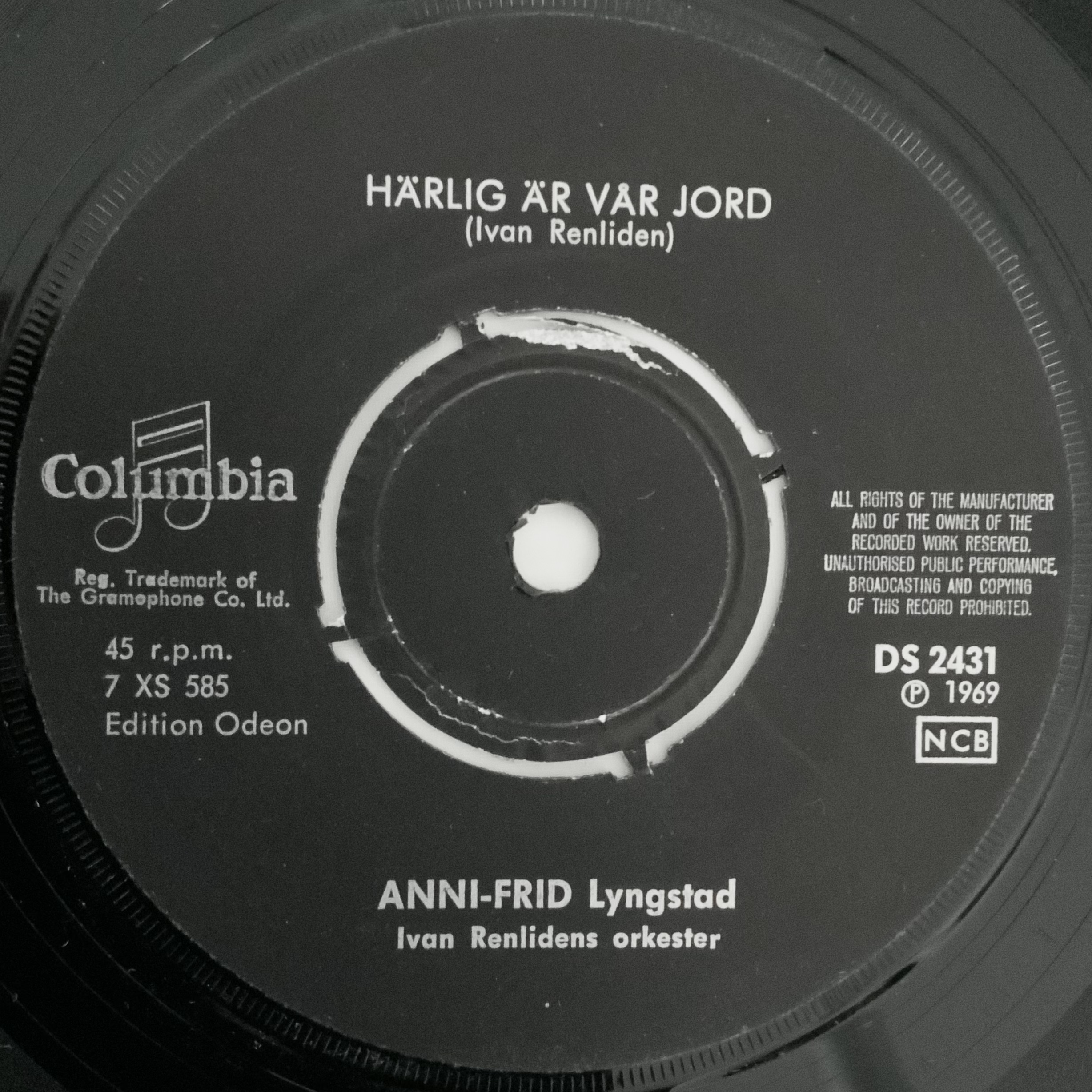

Single by Anni-Frid Lyngstad

from the album Anni-Frid Lyngstad
- Language: Swedish
- English title: Beautiful is Our Earth
- B-side: "Räkna de lyckliga stunderna blott"
- Released: 3 March 1969
- Recorded: 21 December 1968
- Studio: EMI, Stockholm
- Genre: Bossa nova; pop
- Length: 2:42
- Label: EMI; Columbia
- Songwriter: Ivan Renliden

Anni-Frid Lyngstad singles chronology
"Mycket kär / När du blir min" (1968)	"Härlig är vår jord" (1969)	"Så synd du måste gä" (1969)

"Härlig är vår jord" is a Swedish pop song by Anni-Frid Lyngstad from 1969 written and conducted by Ivan Renliden. Lyngstad performed it in Melodifestivalen 1969 where it finished in fifth place with eight points.

== Background ==
In autumn 1968, Lyngstad had been selected for Melodifestivalen 1969 alongside 9 other artists. The artists then received an open-entry of compositions, which Lyngstad received Relinden's composition by December 1968. By the time of the composition deadline on 1 February 1969, Lyngstad had 200 entries, which she reduced down to 31, but ultimately chose "Härlig är vår jord", hoping it would do well.

Lyngstad recorded "Härlig är vår jord" at EMI Studios, Stockholm in two takes on 21 December 1968 alongside a schlager song, "Räkna de lyckliga stunderna blott" with Ivan Renlidens Orkester.

== Melodifestivalen ==
Melodifestivalen 1969 was held on 1 March 1969 at Cirkus, Stockholm and had 99 people in the jury. Lyngstad had met her future husband Benny Andersson at this event, who had co-written Jan Malmsjö's song. Both would recall that after the broadcast they had exchanged a quick hello backstage, no more than that. Backed by three singers, Lyngstad had difficulties rehearsing the song, but the performed had been well prepared by the time the show started.

The event was broadcast on TV, although only audio footage survives. Lyngstad wore an orange tunic and was the penultimate performance. "Härlig är vår jord" had been placed joint fourth with 8 points.

=== Aftermath ===
After the contest, Lyngstad returned to perform on the Charlie Norman Show, which ran from January to May. On 4 March 1969, the Hep Stars attended an after-show of the Charlie Norman Show with Lyngstad for dinner, including Benny Andersson and Björn Ulvaeus. Within a month, Lyngstad and Andersson became a couple. Despite Lyngstad's unsuccessful attempt and Andersson's composition ultimately being the runner-up, they would go on to compete and win Melodifestivalen and Eurovision in 1974 with "Waterloo" as ABBA.

== Release and reception ==
The first release by EMI Records' imprint Columbia initially had "Räkna de lyckliga stunderna blott" as the A-side, while "Härlig är vår jord" on the B-side with a plain sleeve before being withdrawn. Both songs on this pressing were also alternative versions. The single was rectified and released on 3 March 1969 with a picture sleeve, a new catalogue number and 1,000 copies were pressed. This song was published by Swedish publisher, Edition Odeon. Lyngstad and Ollie Bergman went to West Germany to pursue the possibility of marketing a German language version of "Härlig Är Vår Jord", but the single was ultimately not recorded.

"Härlig är vår jord" spent one week at Svensktoppen at #8 on 24 April 1969. This marked the first time Lyngstad appeared on Svensktoppen as her previous singles failed to do so, only appearing in the chart Toppentipset. Lyngstad would not appear again until the following year with "Där du går lämnar kärleken spår".

Dagens Nyheter described Lyngstad and the song as "a beautiful woman, a beautiful song" and remarked that as a newcomer, "she did unusually well with this bossa nova, which was charming without lacking character, pleasant without being boring" but called it forgettable, despite its "neat arrangement".

== Charts ==
Chart (1969)	Peak position
Sweden (Svensktoppen)	8

== Covers ==
Ivan Renliden recorded the song in 1976 for his album Ivan Renliden spelar Ivan Renliden.

== See also ==
- Melodifestivalen 1969
