= No Sad Song =

1971 song by Helen Reddy

- German 7-inch single cover

Single by Helen Reddy

from the album Helen Reddy
- B-side: "More than You Could Take"
- Released: November 1971
- Recorded: 1971
- Studio: Capitol, Los Angeles
- Length: 3:00
- Label: Capitol
- Songwriters: Carole King; Toni Stern
- Producer: Larry Marks

Helen Reddy singles chronology
"Crazy Love" (1971)	"No Sad Song" (1971)	"I Am Woman" (1972)

"No Sad Song" is a song written in 1971 by Carole King and Toni Stern. It was recorded by Australian singer-songwriter Helen Reddy, appearing on her album Helen Reddy, released in November 1971.

== Helen Reddy version ==
=== Release and reception ===
The single peaked at number 62 in January 1972 on the Billboard Hot 100 chart, staying on the chart for eight weeks. "No Sad Song" showed up on the Easy Listening (Adult Contemporary) chart for 4 weeks, rising to number 32. It also reached number 51 on the pop chart in Canada's RPM magazine.

Village Voice critic Robert Christgau described "No Sad Song" as a minor hit for Reddy, and a missed chance for King to have a "tougher" song on one of her own albums. Stern's lyrics for "No Sad Song" describe the history and the death of a ladies' man, "stabbed in his bed" where he had brought so many women. The New Yorker called the song "Brecht-and-Weillian", referring to Bertolt Brecht and Kurt Weill, famous for the murder-minded song "Mack the Knife". "No Sad Song" was called a "ballad about the unlamented murder of a rake."

"No Sad Song" was released in North America on 7-inch, 45 rpm vinyl with Reddy's self-penned song "More than You Could Take" on the B-side. In early 1972, several European printings of the single were released. Reddy recorded a French-language version of "No Sad Song" translated to "Plus de chanson triste", making it available in both languages in France.

The song is one of two low-performing singles that Reddy put out in 1971, the other being her version of "Crazy Love" by Van Morrison, which rose to number 51 in September 1971. Reddy's first big success was "I Don't Know How to Love Him" which hit number 12 in June 1971, so the next two singles were considered disappointments. It was not until 1972's "I Am Woman" that Reddy hit the top of the charts, the song appearing in frustrating fits in June and September charts then finally breaking through to number 1 in December. Reddy said later to Ms. magazine's Susan Lydon that "No Sad Song" was too antagonistic: "it never took off because it put down men too much."

=== Charts ===
Chart (1971–1972)	Peak position
US Billboard Hot 100	62
US Easy Listening (Billboard)	32
Canada (RPM)	51

== Other versions ==
- French singer Sheila covered Reddy's French-language version as "Plus de chansons tristes" (making it plural "Songs") for her 1972 album Poupée de Porcelaine (Porcelain Doll). Pierre Delanoë wrote the French lyrics about a "suburban Don Juan".
- Swedish singer Anni-Frid "Frida" Lyngstad recorded the song in January 1972 as one of her last solo sessions for EMI Records. The lyrics were written by her new manager Stig Anderson, with the song titled "Kom och sjung en sång" (translation: Come and Sing a Song). This was released as a B-side to Lyngstad's final EMI single "Vi är alla bara barn i början". Her future ABBA bandmates Agnetha Fältskog and Björn Ulvaeus provided backing vocals on both songs in a recording session produced by Benny Andersson, also a future ABBA member. Jazz musician Kjell Öhman played accordion and piano. The single did not chart, but the B-side was ranked at number 14 in the Toppentipset list published in the tabloids Expressen and Aftonbladet.
