= En ledig dag =

1967 single by Östen Warnerbring and Anni-Frid Lyngstad

"En ledig dag" (transl. "A Day Off") is a Swedish song with lyrics by Bengt Sten, originally released in 1967 by Swedish singer Östen Warnerbring. The melody is based on the 1964 Italian song "Weekend in Portofino", composed by Bruno De Filippi with lyrics by Matteo Chiosso and recorded by Gian Costello. A cover version was the debut single released by Swedish singer Anni-Frid Lyngstad.

== Östen Warnerbring version ==
"En ledig dag"

Single by Östen Warnerbring
- Language: Swedish
- B-side: "Sommarvind"
- Released: 1967
- Length: 3:25
- Composer(s): Bruno De Filippi
- Lyricist(s): Bengt Sten

Warnerbring's version, first released on the EP Sommarvind in February 1967, was backed by Marcus Österdahl's Orchestra. The song then released as a single and was a minor hit, charting in the Svensktoppen at 9th place in June 1967, staying in the chart for 1 week.

=== Charts ===
Chart (1967)	Peak position
Sweden (Svenkstoppen)	9

== Anni-Frid Lyngstad version ==
"En ledig dag"

Single by Anni-Frid Lyngstad

from the album Anni-Frid Lyngstad
- Language: Swedish
- B-side: "Peter kom tillbaka"
- Released: September 1967
- Recorded: 11 September 1967
- Studio: Europafilm Studio, Stockholm
- Genre: Pop; jazz
- Length: 2:55
- Label: His Master's Voice
- Composer(s): Bruno De Filippi
- Lyricist(s): Bengt Sten
- Producer(s): Olle Bergman

Anni-Frid Lyngstad singles chronology
"En ledig dag" (1967)	"Din" (1967)

=== Background ===
==== Dagen-H performance, recording session ====
After winning the Swedish talent competition Nya ansikten ("New Faces") in the national final held at Skansen on 3 September 1967, Lyngstad performed the song live on TV the same night. The day was Dagen H (right hand traffic reorganization day), when Sweden changed from left-hand to right-hand traffic. Lyngstad's first professional recording session was on 11 September 1967 at Europafilm Studio, Stockholm, when she recorded the vocals for "En ledig dag" in a single take.

=== Legacy and impact ===
Lyngstad's version of "En ledig dag" did not enter the Svensktoppen chart but had circulated in the Toppentipset chart at 11th place on 15 October 1967 and 13th place the following week. Most of Lyngstad's continuous singles had this fate. She did not reach to her breakthrough until two years later, she appeared as a contestant for Melodifestivalen, singing "Härlig är vår jord", and toured with Charlie Norman's cabaret shows. Nonetheless, this single marked the turning point of Anni-Frid's life that her singing career would become successful in the future. This single was originally released as a non-album single in September 1967, but has been included on her compilation albums, Anni-Frid Lyngstad, Tre kvart från nu and Frida 1967–1972.

=== Charts ===
Chart (1967)	Peak position
Sweden (Toppentipset)	11
