= Anni-Frid Lyngstad =

Swedish singer (born 1945)

Anni-Frid Lyngstad KVO1kl
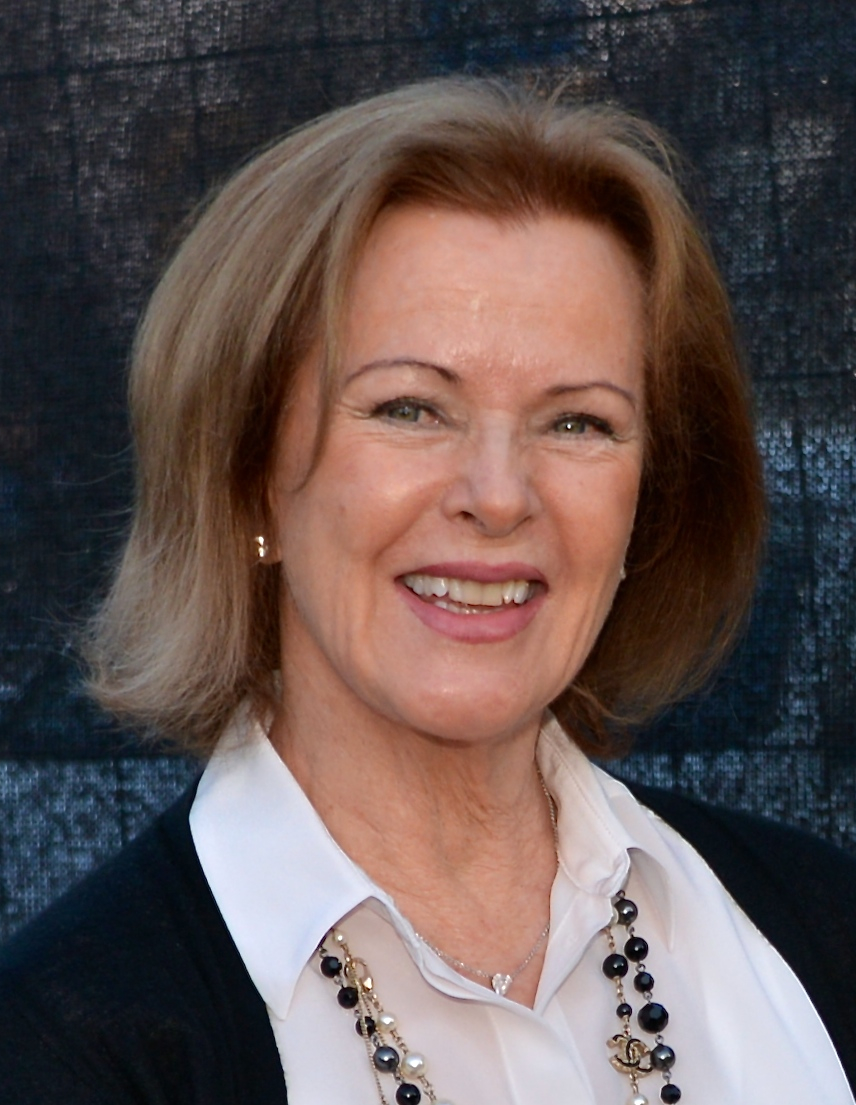
- Lyngstad at the opening of ABBA The Museum in 2013
- Born: Anni-Frid Synni Lyngstad; 15 November 1945 (age 80); Bjørkåsen, Norway
- Spouses: Ragnar Fredriksson (m. 1964; div. 1970) Benny Andersson (m. 1978; div. 1981) Heinrich Ruzzo Prinz Reuss von Plauen (m. 1992; died 1999)
- Partner: Henry Smith, 5th Viscount Hambleden (2007–present)
- Children: 2
- Musical career
- Also known as: Frida
- Origin: Torshälla, Eskilstuna, Sweden
- Genres: Pop; jazz
- Instrument: Vocals
- Years active: 1958–present
- Labels: His Master's Voice (1967); Columbia (EMI) (1968–1972); Polar (1972–1984); Anderson (1996)
- Formerly of: ABBA

Anni-Frid Synni Lyngstad (Note: Norwegian: [ˈɑ̂nːɪˌfriːd ˈlʏ̀ŋstɑ], Swedish: [ˈânːɪˌfriːd ˈlʏ̂ŋstɑːd].) (born 15 November 1945), also known simply as Frida, is a Norwegian-born Swedish singer who is best known as one of the founding members and lead singers of the pop band ABBA.

Born in Bjørkåsen (Ballangen Municipality), Norway, to a Norwegian mother and a German father, she grew up in Torshälla, Sweden.

Lyngstad found international fame when she joined ABBA, who have sold over 400 million records (albums and singles) worldwide, making the group, which included her second husband Benny Andersson, one of the best-selling music acts in history.

After the breakup of ABBA, she continued an international solo singing career with mixed success, before retiring from music.

== Early life ==
Anni-Frid Synni Lyngstad was born to Synni Lyngstad and German soldier Alfred Haase on 15 November 1945 in Bjørkåsen, a small village in Ballangen Municipality in northern Norway. Fearing reprisal for conceiving a child with a German during Norway's wartime occupation, Synni left Bjørkåsen in 1947 with her mother Arntine and the infant Anni-Frid. Anni-Frid was taken by her grandmother to Sweden, where they settled in the region of Härjedalen. Arntine took any available job while living there, whereas Synni remained in Norway and worked for a time in the south of the country. Synni joined her mother and daughter in Sweden, and the three moved to Malmköping (72 km from Stockholm). Synni died of kidney failure soon afterwards, aged 21 years, leaving Anni-Frid to be raised solely by her grandmother Arntine. Anni-Frid grew up believing her father had died during World War II, as his ship had been reported to have sunk on its return to Germany.

In June 1949, Arntine and Anni-Frid relocated to Torshälla, outside Eskilstuna, where Arntine worked as a seamstress. Anni-Frid grew up in Torshälla and began to attend school in August 1952. During her childhood, Anni-Frid had close contact with her mother's family, particularly her uncle and four aunts, at her birthplace during the summer holidays. She was particularly close to her aunt, Olive, who once stated that she saw how lonely and subdued Anni-Frid was, and who consequently always did her best to make her feel loved and welcomed during her visits.

In 1977, the German teen magazine Bravo published a poster and a complete biography with details of Anni-Frid's background, including the names of her mother and father. It was seen by Anni-Frid's half-brother, Peter Haase, who went to his father and asked him if he had been in Ballangen during the war. A few months later, at the instigation of Benny Andersson, Anni-Frid met her father in Stockholm for the first time.

== Career ==
=== 1958–1969: Early work ===
Lyngstad stated in several interviews that her grandmother frequently sang songs to her (such as old Norwegian songs), which resulted in her passion for music. She showed musical talent at a very early age, from her earliest school years. On Fridays, she was often asked by her teacher to sing in front of the class and soon became known in school and in the neighbourhood for her beautiful voice. Although her grandmother encouraged her to sing (according to Lyngstad herself), she never attended any of her performances. Her grandmother died shortly before ABBA formed, so she never witnessed the success of the group.

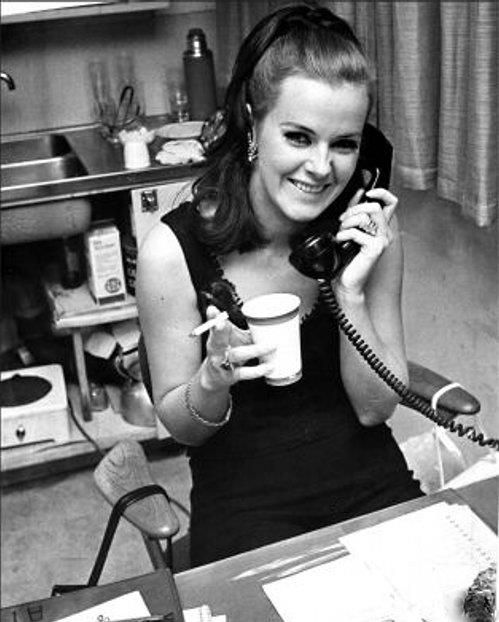
Lyngstad in September 1967

At the age of 13, Lyngstad gained her first job as a dance band and schlager singer in 1958, with the Evald Ek's Orchestra. Evald Ek himself remembers: "It was hard to believe, such a young person could sing that well. She was so easy to rehearse with and she was never shy onstage. The only thing I taught her was to sing out. In those days, she had a tendency of holding back her voice a little." With the Evald Elk's Orchestra, the 13-year-old Lyngstad, performed every weekend in front of a dancing audience. The sets often lasted up to five hours. The songs she liked most to sing were standards such as "All of Me", "Night and Day" and "Begin the Beguine". To advance and develop, she also started to take singing lessons for two years with opera tenor Folke Andersson. Later, she teamed up with the 15-piece Bengt Sandlunds Bigband, who performed a jazz repertoire covering Glenn Miller, Duke Ellington and Count Basie, her vocal idols being Ella Fitzgerald and Peggy Lee. In 1963, she was the vocalist with the Gunnar Sandevarn Trio before forming her own band, the Anni-Frid Four. These groups all contained her husband, Ragnar Fredriksson.

On 3 September 1967, Lyngstad won the Swedish national talent competition "New Faces", arranged by record company EMI Svenska and held at Skansen, Stockholm. The song she chose to sing was "En ledig dag" ("A Day Off"; original title "Week-End in Portofino"). The first prize in this contest was a recording contract with EMI's Swedish subsidiary. Unbeknownst to Lyngstad, the winner of the contest was also expected to appear the same evening in the country's most popular TV show at that time, Hylands Hörna. This happened on the same day Sweden switched from driving on the left-hand side of the road to the right-hand side. Driving on that day was discouraged, so most of the nation was watching TV that night. Lyngstad performed her winning song live. The performance can be seen on Frida – The DVD.

This first exposure to a wider television audience caused a sensation, and many record companies and producers contacted Frida immediately. EMI executives, fearing they might lose their new singer, took the precaution of driving from Stockholm to Lyngstad's home in Eskilstuna the next morning with a recording contract for her to sign. EMI producer Olle Bergman remembers: "We got so interested and fond of her and I thought she had everything a person needs to become something."

On 11 September 1967, Lyngstad recorded the vocals for "En ledig dag", which was to become her first single for EMI, under the company's British His Master's Voice label. Professional and self-assured on this first day in the studio, she recorded the vocals in just one take. The early songs she recorded for EMI are included in the compilation album Frida 1967–1972, released by EMI Sweden in 1997.

On 29 January 1968, she performed this song on Studio 8 on national television and on this occasion briefly met future ABBA member Agnetha Fältskog, who also performed her first single on the same SVT1 programme. Lyngstad toured Sweden with Lasse Lönndahl and Bengt Hallberg in 1968, and recorded several singles for EMI. At the same time, she decided to leave her family and move to Stockholm to start working full-time as a singer.

In 1969, she participated in Melodifestivalen, the Swedish heats for the Eurovision Song Contest, with the song "Härlig Är Vår Jord" ("Our Earth Is Wonderful"), and finished in fourth place. Backstage she met her future second husband and ABBA bandmate Benny Andersson.

=== 1970–1971: Pre-ABBA ===
Her first album, Frida, produced by her then-fiancé Benny Andersson, was released in 1971 by EMI Columbia. The album received generous praise from critics and the press, who especially commented on the precision and versatility of Lyngstad's voice. A reviewer for the Swedish newspaper Dagens Nyheter wrote: "Professional, sure and certain LP-debut ... low-key but self-assured personality with sprinkles of temperament, humor and tenderness. And she sings in such a way that you understand that she's got something between her ears – she sings, in other words, in a very intelligent way." That same year, she released her single "Min egen stad" ('My Own Town'), a cover version of Andersson's song "It's Nice To Be Back" with lyrics by Peter Himmelstrand; the single reached No. 1 in Svensktoppen. All four future members of ABBA sang back-up vocals on this song. The success of the single led EMI Columbia to re-issue the Frida album with "Min egen stad" added to the beginning of side two of the LP. The entire album was included in the EMI Sweden compilation Frida 1967–1972.

"Min egen stad"
"Min egen stad" was Lyngstad's first No. 1 hit for Svensktoppen on 24 October 1971.

Frida continued to play in cabarets, and tour and regularly perform on TV and radio. Subsequently, her relationship with Andersson, and friendship with Björn Ulvaeus and Agnetha Fältskog led to the formation of ABBA. In 1972, after five years with EMI Sweden, Lyngstad changed record companies and moved to the Polar Music label. She recorded the single "Man vill ju leva lite dessemellan" ("One wants to live a little from time to time"), which became her second No. 1 hit in the Swedish charts.

=== 1972–1981: ABBA and Frida ensam ===
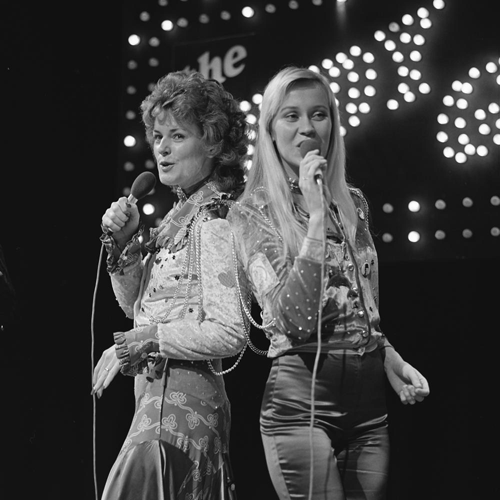
Lyngstad (left) and Fältskog in 1974

At first, Lyngstad was hesitant to perform with her boyfriend Benny Andersson, his best friend Björn Ulvaeus and his wife, Agnetha Fältskog. Their first professional collaboration was the cabaret act Festfolket (later known as Festfolk in a 1971 revue), which was a critical and commercial failure, playing to near-empty restaurants and being panned by critics for its outdated material. The following year, Lyngstad continued her solo career, touring with Lasse Berghagen and releasing her second solo album, Frida, produced by Benny Andersson, which demonstrated a move towards a more contemporary pop-rock sound. Meanwhile, the other three future ABBA members started performing together on a regular basis, forming the performing group Björn & Benny, and recording the hit single "She's My Kind of Girl". Eventually, she rejoined the ensemble for a series of performances and recording sessions. Andersson and Ulvaeus were busy producing other artists, but soon discovered the unique quality of Lyngstad's and Fältskog's voices combined; music historian Carl Magnus Palm notes that the four-part harmony on the song "People Need Love" was a pivotal moment, revealing the commercial potential of their vocal blend. Thus, the band was formed initially as Björn & Benny, Agnetha & Anni-Frid, later renamed ABBA.

Possessing a wide mezzo-soprano vocal range, that covers C#3 to Eb6, Lyngstad's voice was characterised by its warm, velvety tone and a remarkable technical precision that allowed her to handle complex melodic lines with ease. Her classical upbringing and early professional experience singing jazz and schlager music gave her a distinct versatility, enabling her to interpret everything from the dramatic and melancholic "Knowing Me, Knowing You" to the playful and light "Me and Bobby and Bobby's Brother". Within ABBA's signature sound, her darker, richer mezzo-soprano provided a crucial counterpoint to Agnetha Fältskog's brighter, purer soprano, creating the intricate vocal harmonies that became the group's trademark. She sang solo parts on a diverse array of ABBA tracks, including "Andante, Andante", "Bumblebee", "Cassandra", "Fernando", "Get on the Carousel", "Gonna Sing You My Lovesong", "I Am the City", "If It Wasn't For The Nights", I Have a Dream", "I Let the Music Speak", "On Top of Old Smokey", "I Still Have Faith in You", "I Wonder (Departure)", "The King Has Lost His Crown", "Knowing Me, Knowing You", "Like an Angel Passing Through My Room", "Lovers (Live a Little Longer)", "Me and Bobby and Bobby's Brother", "Me and I", "Money, Money, Money", "The Name of the Game", "No Doubt About It", "One Man, One Woman", "Our Last Summer", "Put On Your White Sombrero", "Should I Laugh or Cry", "Super Trouper", "Tropical Loveland", "The Visitors", "The Way Old Friends Do" and "When All Is Said and Done".

Lyngstad clearly enjoyed the spotlight more than the other three members of ABBA. She was known as the group's "ambassador" and was often described as the most enthusiastic about performing, finding energy and fulfillment from the live audience. She liked to tour and to meet audience members one-to-one, a stark contrast to Agnetha Fältskog, who famously disliked touring and suffered from stage fright. She took an active part in co-designing the famed ABBA costumes for their tours and TV performances, working closely with designer Owe Sandström on iconic outfits like the "Super Trouper" jumpsuits and the Viking-inspired regalia for the 1974 Eurovision Song Contest. After the members of ABBA went their separate ways, Lyngstad was the only one who openly and repeatedly expressed a desire for the group to perform together again. In a 2005 interview, she stated, "I miss the others. I think we should [reunite]... for a charity event, maybe. It would be a wonderful thing to do," highlighting her lasting commitment to the group's legacy. This stance made her the member most associated with calls for a reunion, a hope that was finally fulfilled when ABBA got back together to record the Voyage album in 2017.

Her next solo album, in Swedish, was Frida ensam ("Frida Alone"), released in 1975 during the ABBA years, and produced by Andersson. This album includes her successful Swedish version of "Fernando", which stayed at the No. 1 spot in the Svensktoppen radio charts for nine weeks, but was never released as a single. The album was recorded between sessions of the ABBA albums Waterloo and ABBA. Because of the activities of the group, the album took 18 months to record. Frida ensam became an enormous commercial and critical success in Sweden, topping the Swedish album charts for six weeks and remaining in the charts for 38. The album was mostly a collection of covers of songs by artists such as the Beach Boys (Wouldn't It Be nice, "Skulle de' va' skönt"), 10cc (The Wall Street Shuffle, "Guld och gröna ängar") and David Bowie (Life on Mars?, "Liv på Mars?"), receiving positive reviews from Melody Maker: "The album portrays Frida as a very strong and emotive singer and shows the true value of the music, that if sung properly and with enough feeling it transcends all language barriers". This album eventually went platinum.

=== 1982–1984: International solo career ===
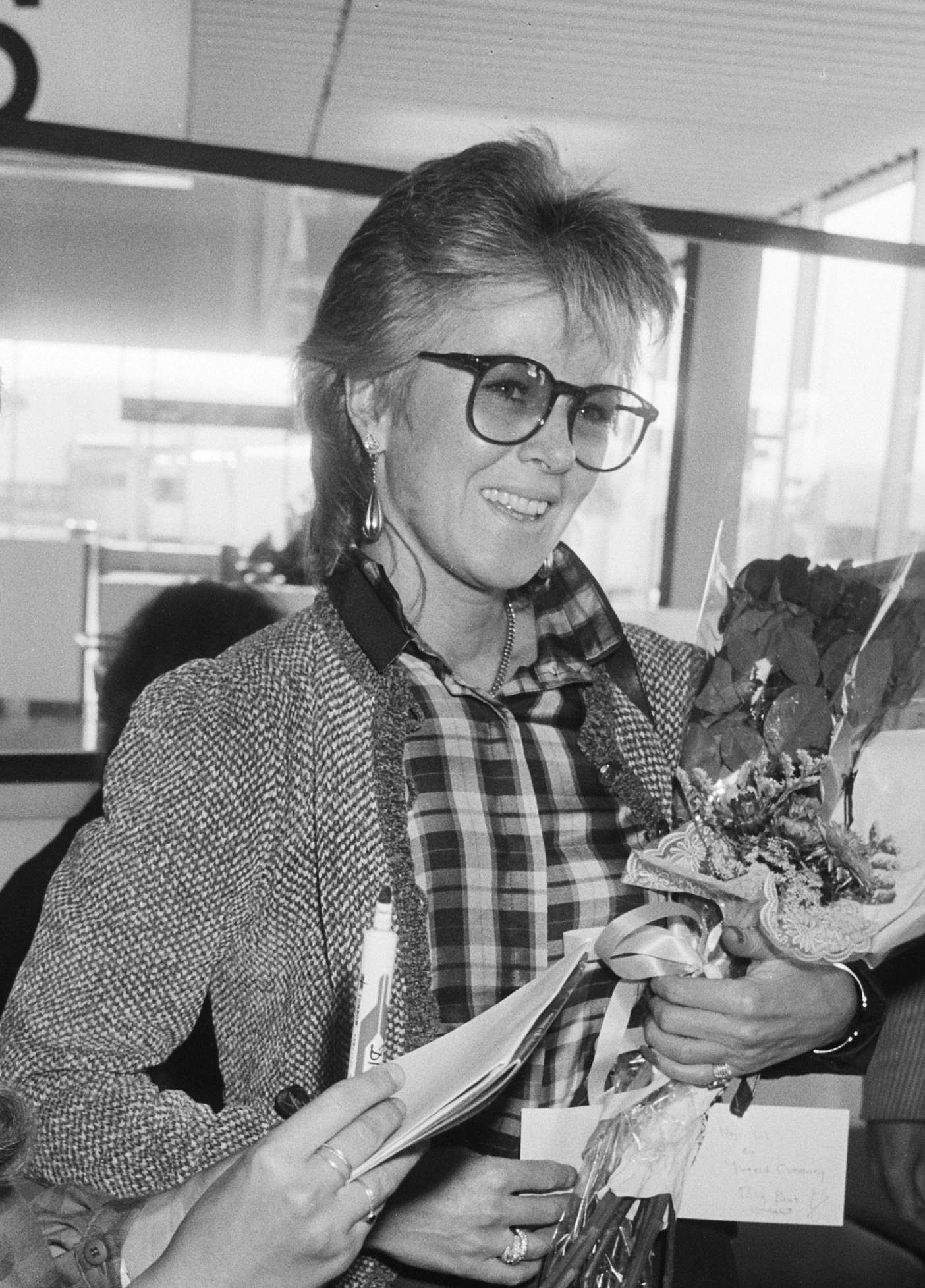
Lyngstad in Amsterdam, the Netherlands, October 1982

In 1982, during ABBA's last year as a working band, Frida recorded and released her first post-ABBA solo album. This was also her first solo album in English. The Phil Collins-produced album called Something's Going On became a big success for Frida worldwide. A much rockier sound was found on many of the songs and Phil Collins' drum sound had a major contribution, particularly on the lead single, "I Know There's Something Going On", which topped the charts in Belgium and Switzerland, and was a top 5 hit in Australia, Austria, France, Germany, the Netherlands, Norway, South Africa and Sweden among others. With the song and video being heavily promoted and played on MTV, the single also proved successful in the United States, reaching No. 13 on the Billboard Hot 100 (and No. 9 on Radio & Records) in March 1983, and was the 20th-biggest-selling single in the US that year. In the UK, the track was not a big hit, only reaching No. 43.

"I Know There's Something Going On"
Lyngstad's song, "I Know There's Something Going On" depicts a rock-oriented sound, produced by Phil Collins, a contrast to a typical ABBA song.

The album itself received good reviews, with Billboard writing: "ABBA's auburn-haired songstress makes a bold solo project a stunning success", while Mark Coleman described the album in the third edition of The Rolling Stone Album Guide as "a sharp, rock-oriented, delightfully eclectic album". William Cooper had a similar opinion in AllMusic: "Frida escapes the creative limitations of being a member of one of the world's most popular groups on this solid and often riveting album". Swedish Television SVT documented this historical event by filming the whole recording process. The result became a one-hour TV documentary, including interviews with Frida and Phil, Björn and Benny, as well as all the musicians involved with the album. Owing to the success of the album (selling 1.5 million copies worldwide) and its lead single, Frida was voted "Best Female Artist Of The Year" 1982 by the readers of Sweden's biggest evening paper Aftonbladet, receiving the Swedish Music Award Price Rockbjörnen.

In 1983, Lyngstad assisted with Abbacadabra, and recorded one of the tracks with two different male vocalists in different languages, including the French star Daniel Balavoine on the track "Belle" and on the English version "Time" with B. A. Robertson produced by Mike Batt. This track was a cover of "Arrival", an instrumental track from the ABBA album of the same name. She also jumps in and does the female recitation towards the end of the song "Strip" on the Strip album by Adam Ant, who was recording his album at Polar Studios in Stockholm.

Lyngstad's next album was Shine (1984). This album was recorded at Studios De La Grande Armée in Paris and produced by Steve Lillywhite. Lillywhite was only 29 when this album was recorded; he gave Lyngstad a very experimental sound and managed to create a relaxed atmosphere in the studio. The album had much less success than hoped, though it reached the Top 20 in many European countries, No. 6 in Sweden being its highest position.

=== 1985–2004: Later career ===
In 1987, Lyngstad was in the choir for the recording of her former husband Benny Andersson's song "Klinga Mina Klockor". Also in 1987, Lyngstad recorded the single "Så länge vi har varann" ("As Long As We Have Each Other") with the Swedish pop group Ratata, one of Lyngstad's favourites. She was contacted by singer Mauro Scocco, who mentioned that he had a song suitable for a duet. After hearing it, Lyngstad accepted immediately. The song achieved great success in Sweden, and was also recorded in English under the title of "As long as I have you". An English-language video of the song was produced, although an Australian release of this song on Festival Records in January 1998 was eventually shelved.

In 1990, Lyngstad became a member of the committee of the Swedish environmental organization Det Naturliga Steget ('The Natural Step'). The organization wanted a "famous face" to help them reach the public, and in 1991 she became chairwoman for the organization Artister För Miljö ('Artists for the Environment'). In 1992, Lyngstad founded her Children and Environment Foundation which runs summer camps for underprivileged children. Also in 1992, Lyngstad performed live at the Stockholm Water Festival at the Kings Castle and released the environmental charity single with her cover of Julian Lennon's song "Saltwater". All the royalties from this single went to charity. In 1993, on Queen Silvia's 50th birthday, Frida was asked to perform "Dancing Queen" on stage, as performed by ABBA when the king and queen married in 1976. Frida contacted The Real Group and together they performed the song at the Stockholm Opera House in front of the king and queen. This performance was filmed by Swedish TV and can be seen in Frida: The DVD.

In 1996, Lyngstad recorded her Swedish language album Djupa andetag ("Deep Breaths"). It was a long-awaited album as 12 years had passed since Shine was released. The album attracted overall relatively positive reviews and was a success in Sweden where it reached No. 1 on the album chart. Frida did many TV appearances in Sweden, Norway, Denmark and Finland to promote the album. Djupa andetag was one of the first Swedish albums to be released as a combined audio-video CD-ROM, including interviews with Lyngstad, footage from the making of the album, as well as promotional videos. Despite the fact that Djupa andetag was officially only released in Scandinavia and the songs were entirely sung in Swedish, a remix album of the single tracks "Även en blomma", "Alla Mina Bästa År" (a duet with Roxette's Marie Fredriksson) and "Ögonen" was released in Germany in 1998, entitled Frida – The Mixes. Despite the success of the album, none of these singles made a big impression on the Swedish charts. A one-hour documentary about the making of this album, both in the studio and from Frida's home in Mallorca, Spain, can be seen in Frida: The DVD. A follow-up album with producer Anders Glenmark was reportedly in the works, but was shelved because of the death of Frida's daughter in 1998. Lyngstad dedicated the song "Chemistry Tonight" (co-written by Kirsty MacColl) to the songwriter after MacColl's death in 2000.

A few low key and one-off recordings followed, including a 2002 duet with opera singer Filippa Giordano of the "Barcarolle" from Jacques Offenbach's Les contes d'Hoffman as well as the song "The Sun Will Shine Again", written by former Deep Purple member Jon Lord, and recorded in 2004. "Barcarolle" is only available on the Japanese edition of Giordano's album Rosso Amore and "The Sun Will Shine Again" can be found on Jon Lord's album Beyond The Notes (although a limited-promotional single had been made available). Lord and Lyngstad made several TV appearances in Germany performing the song, on shows like The Sunday Night Classics and The Golden Henne Gala. Lyngstad also joined Lord on stage singing the song during his European autumn tour in 2004. During this tour, she also performed "In the Bleak Midwinter", a performance of which can be found on social media.

For the 2004 semi-final of the Eurovision Song Contest, staged in Istanbul 30 years after ABBA had won the contest in Brighton, Lyngstad appeared in a special comedy video made for the interval act, entitled Our Last Video. All four members of the group appeared briefly in cameo roles, as did the singer Cher and British comedian Rik Mayall among others. The video was not included in the official DVD release of the Eurovision Contest, but was issued as a separate DVD release on the Universal Music label. It was billed as the first time the four had worked together since the group split in 1982 although they each filmed their appearances separately. Also in 2004, Lyngstad appeared with former bandmates Benny Andersson and Björn Ulvaeus in London at the fifth-anniversary performance of Mamma Mia!, the musical based on ABBA songs. In 2008, she joined all three of her former ABBA colleagues at the Swedish premiere of Mamma Mia! at the arena Cirkus in Stockholm.

=== 2005–present: Hiatus from music, selected public appearances and ABBA reunion ===
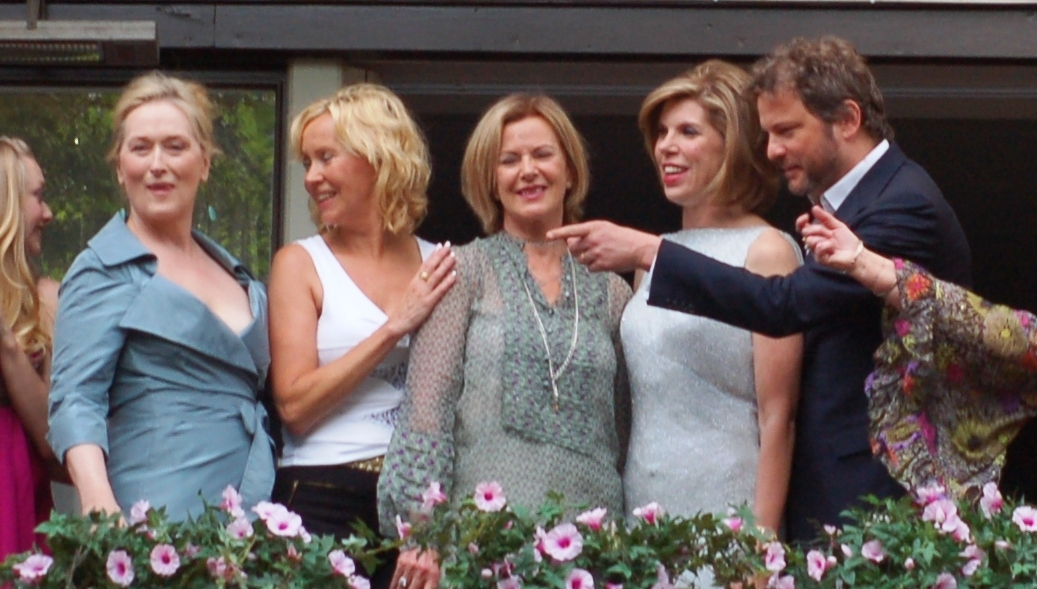
Amanda Seyfried, Meryl Streep, Agnetha Fältskog, Lyngstad (centre), Christine Baranski and Colin Firth in 2008

On 15 November 2005, to celebrate Lyngstad's 60th birthday, Universal Records released the box set Frida: 4×CD 1×DVD, consisting of all the solo albums she recorded for Polar Music and Anderson Records, including a set of bonus tracks. Also included was Frida: The DVD, a 3.5-hour documentary where Lyngstad talks about her entire career in the music business. Filmed in the Swiss Alps, she talks about her singing technique and about her career both before and after ABBA, and explains how songs were performed and recorded. In collaboration with Swedish TV, SVT, the film included many clips from her early television performances, such as her first TV performance with "En ledig dag" ("A Day Off"). Also included are TV documentaries about the making and recordings of Something's Going On and Djupa andetag ("Deep Breaths").

In 2007, Lyngstad became one of the initial patrons of the Zermatt Unplugged Music Festival along with Jon Lord and Claude Nobs.

In September 2010, a new album by musician Georg Wadenius titled Reconnection was released. Lyngstad and Wadenius had discussed working together for many years, as they had long been good friends. The album opens with her rendition of the traditional tune "Morning Has Broken", previously covered by Cat Stevens. This song is a favourite for Frida and the song was also on the playlist in the church for Frida and Prince Ruzzo's wedding on 26 August 1992.

On 16 February 2011, BBC Radio 4 broadcast a 45-minute play featuring Lyngstad and the play's writer, long-term fan and performer Kit Green. The play, Like an Angel Passing Through My Room, was billed as "a story about love. The unconditional love of a devoted fan ... about a real and an imagined intimacy." It was a project several years in the making; what started as an upbeat reflection on fame and being a fan developed into a meditation on the communication between two people and coping with the blows life deals. In an interview, she and Green talked about her long recovery following the death of her husband in 1999. The play is reflective but with a comic sensibility. Lyngstad stated in 2004 that she never intended to return to the music industry, although this was short-lived, and future studio albums were discussed in 2010.

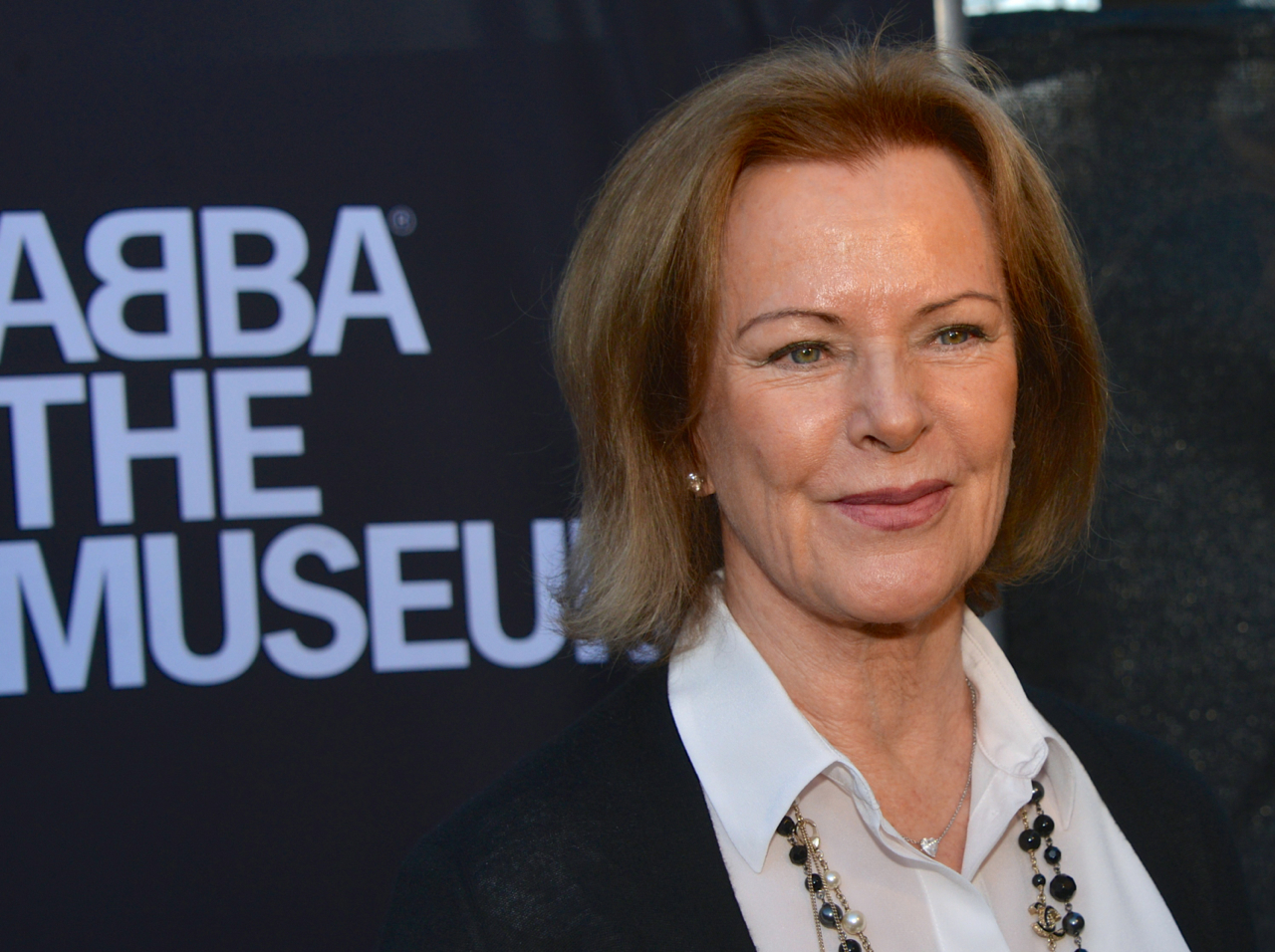
Lyngstad during the opening of ABBA The Museum on 6 May 2013

In 2013, she helped organise the opening of ABBA The Museum in Stockholm stating she wanted to "let ABBA rest". The long-awaited ABBA reunion was expected to happen in 2014 to celebrate the 40th anniversary of the group's win at the Eurovision Song Contest. However, this did not happen. In 2015, Lyngstad, along with Dan Daniell, released the single "1865" about the Matterhorn in Switzerland.

On 19 August 2017, Lyngstad travelled to Torshälla to claim her award from the Eskilstuna Music Prize 2014.

In the summer of 2017, Lyngstad joined her ABBA bandmates Agnetha Faltskög, Björn Ulvaeus and Benny Andersson to record two new songs, "I Still Have Faith in You" and "Don't Shut Me Down". These songs were meant to be part of an ABBA-themed TV special that was eventually discarded and replaced by the more ambitious, digital-laden Voyage show.

In 2018, Lyngstad and jazz trumpeter Arturo Sandoval released a duet of the ABBA song "Andante, Andante" as a single. The song is featured on Sandoval's album Ultimate Duets.

On 2 September 2021, via YouTube livestream, ABBA announced their upcoming virtual concert residency "ABBA Voyage", as well as the imminent release of an eponymous album, recorded between 2017 and 2021. The new record, their first studio album in 40 years, features ten tracks, including "I Still Have Faith In You" and "Don't Shut Me Down", which also were first shown in the aforementioned livestream event and released as a double A-side single. On 5 November 2021, the Voyage album was released worldwide. On 27 May 2022, ABBA Voyage opened in a purpose-built venue named the ABBA Arena at the Queen Elizabeth Olympic Park in London.

== Personal life ==
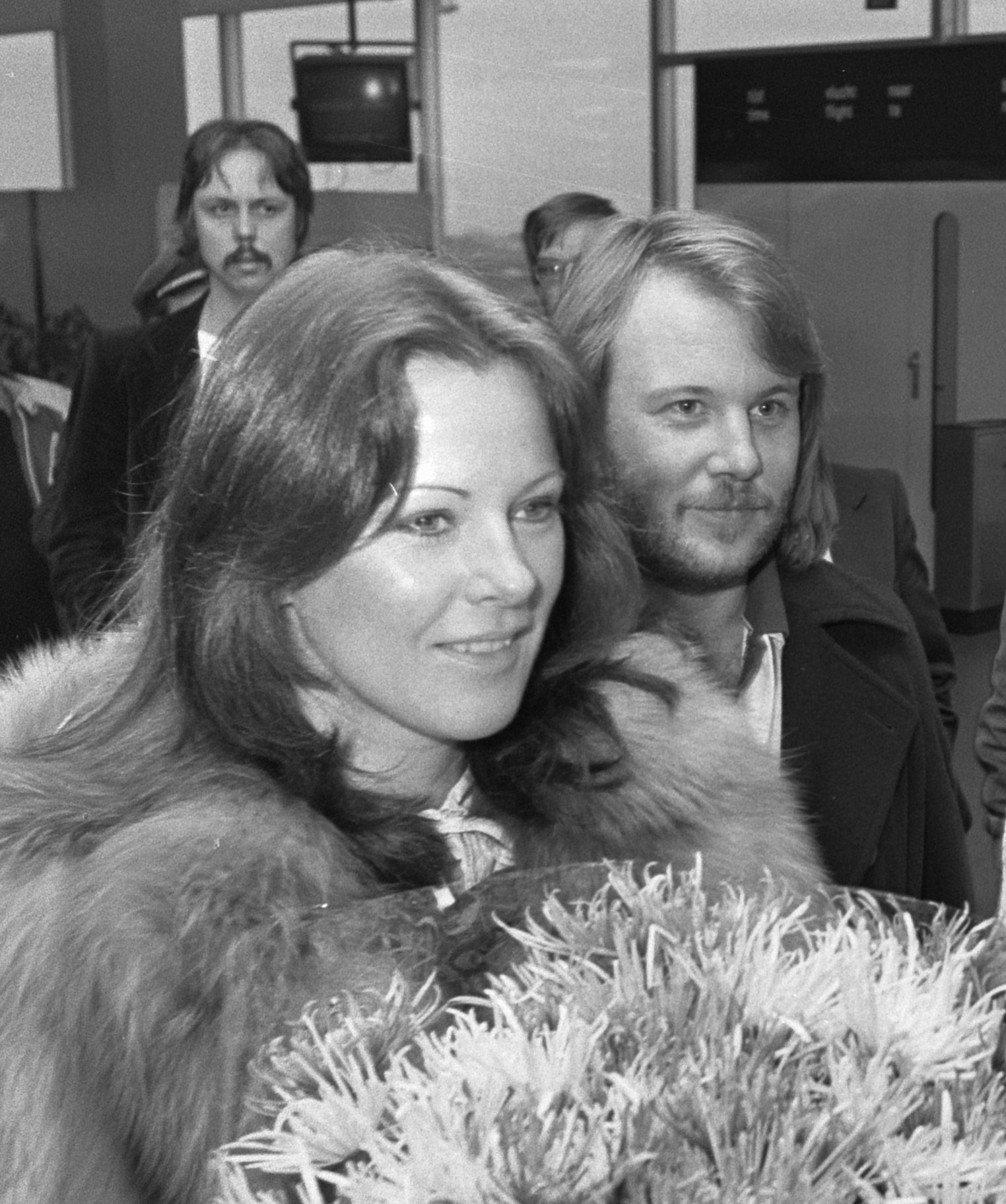
Lyngstad and Andersson at Amsterdam Airport Schiphol, 1976

On 3 April 1964, 18-year-old Lyngstad married salesman and fellow musician Ragnar Fredriksson. They had two children before separating in 1968; their divorce was finalized on 19 May 1970.

In 1969, Lyngstad met Benny Andersson. They were living together by 1971 and married on 6 October 1978, during the height of ABBA's success. The couple separated in November 1980 and divorced in 1981.

After the end of ABBA, Lyngstad left Sweden in 1982 and moved to London. In 1986, she relocated to Switzerland, where she lived with her partner, Heinrich Ruzzo Prinz Reuss von Plauen (1950–1999), a landscape architect and member of the German House of Reuss. The couple married on 26 August 1992 and lived in his family’s castle in Fribourg. Through this marriage, Lyngstad became acquainted with the Swedish royal family and developed a close friendship with Queen Silvia.

In 1989, Lyngstad became a grandmother when her daughter, Ann Lise-Lotte Fredriksson, had a son, Jonathan Casper. On 13 January 1998, Ann Lise-Lotte died at the age of 30 from injuries sustained in a car accident in Livonia, New York. Heinrich Ruzzo Prinz Reuss von Plauen died the following year from lymphoma.

Since 2007, Lyngstad has been in a relationship with British peer Henry Smith, 5th Viscount Hambleden, with whom she lives in Genolier, Switzerland. In 2023, her grandson Jonathan died from stomach cancer.

=== Other interests ===
According to Dagens Nyheter and Sveriges Radio, Lyngstad has supported the Swedish Moderate Party. She appeared in a Swedish Employers Association advertisement, Satsa på dig själv ("Invest in yourself"), in 1979, which caused controversy and objections from the left, especially from Mikael Wiehe, who rejected her offer to record a cover version of his song "Flickan och kråkan", because of political differences, in the 1980s.

Living in Zermatt, Switzerland, for many years, she became an accomplished skier and enjoyed hiking through the mountains. She has hiked through the Himalayas, climbed Mount Kenya, and completed the 'Haute Route' in the Alps.

Lyngstad is a vegetarian and a feminist. She remains involved in charity work. She is interested in environmental issues.

== Awards and recognition ==
- Sweden: Royal Order of Vasa, Commander First Class (21 March 2024)

In 1964, Lyngstad won a national singing contest Flugan (The Fly) and was awarded "Vocalist of the Year". In September 1967, Lyngstad won the Barnens Dag contest held at Skansen, Stockholm. This led to her TV debut and a recording contract with EMI. In 1982, Lyngstad won the Swedish music prize Rockbjörnen for "Best Female Artist". She was inducted in the Rock and Roll Hall of Fame as a member of ABBA in 2010, and she represented the group in their acceptance speech, along with Benny Andersson. In 2014, she was awarded with the Eskilstuna Music Prize for her "pioneering career" and significant contribution to popular music as an "icon" who had "left an indelible imprint in musical history".

On 21 March 2024, shortly before the 50th anniversary of their win at the Eurovision Song Contest, all four members of ABBA were appointed Commander, First Class, of the Royal Order of Vasa by King Carl XVI Gustaf of Sweden. This was the first time that the Swedish Royal Orders of Knighthood had been bestowed after almost 50 years of dormancy. The group members shared the honour with nine other people.

== Discography ==
Swedish studio albums

- Frida (1971)
- Frida ensam (1975)
- Djupa andetag (1996)

English studio albums

- Something's Going On (1982)
- Shine (1984)

== Filmography ==
Year	Title	Role	Notes
1977	ABBA: The Movie	Herself	
1978	Gå på vattnet om du kan	Anna	English: Walk on Water If You Can
1980	ABBA – In Concert	Herself	
1984	Jokerfejs	Louise	English: Jokerface
1992	FernGully: The Last Rainforest	Magi Lune (voice)	Dubbed in Swedish
2004	ABBA – The Last Video Ever	Herself	

== See also ==
- List of Swedes in music

== Sources ==
- Carl Magnus Palm: ABBA – The Complete Recording Sessions, Century 22 Limited UK, 1994. ISBN 0-907938-10-8

Awards and achievements
Preceded by Anne-Marie David with "Tu te reconnaîtras"	Winner of the Eurovision Song Contest; 1974 (as part of ABBA)	Succeeded by Teach-In with "Ding-A-Dong"
Preceded by Nova with "You're Summer"	Sweden in the Eurovision Song Contest; 1974 (as part of ABBA)	Succeeded by Lars Berghagen with "Jennie, Jennie"
