= Finland in the Eurovision Song Contest 2007 =

- Eurovision Song Contest 2007
- Participating broadcaster: Yleisradio (Yle)
- Country: Finland
- Selection process: Euroviisut 2007
- Selection date: 17 February 2007

Competing entry
- Song: "Leave Me Alone"
- Artist: Hanna Pakarinen
- Songwriters: Martti Vuorinen; Miikka Huttunen; Hanna Pakarinen

Placement
- Final result: 17th, 53 points

Participation chronology

Finland was represented at the Eurovision Song Contest 2007 with the song "Leave Me Alone", written by Martti Vuorinen, Miikka Huttunen, and Hanna Pakarinen, and performed by Pakarinen herself. The Finnish participating broadcaster, Yleisradio (Yle), organised the national final Euroviisut 2007 in order to select its entry for the contest. In addition, Yle was also the host broadcaster and staged the event at the Hartwall Areena in Helsinki, after winning the previous edition with the song "Hard Rock Hallelujah" performed by Lordi.

Yle selected twelve artists with two songs each to compete in the national final, which consisted of four semi-finals and a final, taking place in January and February 2007. Twelve entries ultimately competed in the final on 17 February where votes from the public selected "Leave Me Alone" performed by Hanna Pakarinen as the winner.

As the host country, Finland qualified to compete directly in the final of the Eurovision Song Contest. Performing in position 5 during the final, Finland placed seventeenth out of the 24 participating countries with 53 points.

== Background ==
Prior to the 2007 contest, Yleisradio (Yle) had participated in the Eurovision Song Contest representing Finland forty times since its first entry in 1961. It has won the contest once in 2006 with the song "Hard Rock Hallelujah" performed by Lordi.

As part of its duties as participating broadcaster, Yle organises the selection of its entry in the Eurovision Song Contest and broadcasts the event in the country. Yle had selected its entries for the contest through national final competitions that have varied in format over the years. Since 1961, a selection show that was often titled Euroviisukarsinta highlighted that the purpose of the program was to select a song for Eurovision. On 11 August 2006, the broadcaster announced that its entry for the 2007 contest would be selected through the Euroviisut selection show.

== Before Eurovision ==
=== Euroviisut 2007 ===
Euroviisut 2007 was the national final that selected the Finnish entry for the Eurovision Song Contest 2007. The competition consisted of five shows that commenced with the first of four semi-finals on 20 January 2007 and concluded with a final on 17 February 2007. The three stages were hosted by Finnish presenters Jaana Pelkonen and Heikki Paasonen. All shows were broadcast on Yle TV2, via radio on Yle Radio Vega and online at yle.fi. The final was also broadcast via radio on Yle Radio Suomi.

==== Format ====
The format of the competition consisted of five shows: four semi-finals and a final. Three artists each competed with two songs in each semi-final and the winning song per act qualified to complete the twelve-song lineup in the final. The results for the semi-finals and the final were determined exclusively by a public vote. Public voting included the options of telephone and SMS voting.

==== Competing entries ====
Twelve artists were directly invited by Yle to compete in the national final following consultation with record companies and presented during a press conference on 8 November 2006. Among the competing artists was former Finnish Eurovision entrant Laura who represented Finland in 2002. The entries competing in each semi-final were presented in weekly preview programmes on Yle Radio Suomi between 15 January 2007 and 5 February 2007. On 6 January 2007, Jann Wilde and Rose Avenue had been disqualified from the competition after their songs "Lover Lover Lover" and "Soft Is Selling" had already been publicly released before the semi-finals. The artists were later allowed by Yle to submit replacement songs by 10 February.

Artist	Song	Songwriter(s)
Beats and Styles feat. Anorah	"See the Signs"	Jaakko Manninen, Asmo Soivio, Heikki Liimatainen, Anna Nordell, Charles Salter
Beats and Styles	"Take It Back"	Jaakko Manninen, Asmo Soivio, Daniel Wahlgren
Hanna Pakarinen	"Leave Me Alone"	Martti Vuorinen, Miikka Huttunen, Hanna Pakarinen
Hanna Pakarinen	"Tell Me What to Do"	Lasse Kurki, Hanna Pakarinen
Humane	"Bubble Shell"	Kim Herold
Humane	"Plane Away"	Kim Herold, D. Thomson
Jani and Jetsetters	"Etupenkillä"	Nalle Ahlstedt, Sirpa Peltola
Jani and Jetsetters	"Musta sulhanen"	Tuure Kilpeläinen
Jann Wilde and Rose Avenue	"Cinnamon"	Jann Wilde, Rose Avenue
Jann Wilde and Rose Avenue	"Rock'n Roll Dreams"	Jann Wilde, Rose Avenue
Johanna Kurkela	"Jossain metsäin takana"	Tomi Aholainen, Sinikka Svärd
Johanna Kurkela	"Olet uneni kaunein"	Tomi Aholainen, Sinikka Svärd
Jukka Kuoppamäki	"Levitä siivet"	Jukka Kuoppamäki
Jukka Kuoppamäki	"Pikajuna"	Jukka Kuoppamäki
Katra	"Tietäjä"	Risto Asikainen, Ilkka Vainio
Katra	"Vaaratar"	Risto Asikainen, Ilkka Vainio
Kentala	"Left My Heart Behind"	Harri Kentala, Janne Hyöty
Kentala	"Merry-Go-Round"	Harri Kentala, Janne Hyöty
Laura	"Kosketa mua"	Maki Kolehmainen, Mats Tärnfors, Tracy Lipp
Laura	"Take a Chance"	Maki Kolehmainen, Mats Tärnfors, Tracy Lipp
Lovex	"Anyone, Anymore"	Lovex
Lovex	"Wild and Violent"	Lovex
Thunderstone	"Forevermore"	Thunderstone, Nino Laurenne
Thunderstone	"Face in the Mirror"	Thunderstone, Nino Laurenne

==== Semi-finals ====
The four semi-final shows took place on 20 January, 27 January, 3 February and 10 February 2007 at the Tohloppi Studios in Tampere. One song per competing artist qualified to the final based on the results from the public vote. A total of 51,535 votes were cast over the four shows. In addition to the competing entries, Arja Saijonmaa and 1966 Finnish Eurovision entrant Ann-Christine Nyström performed as the interval act in the first semi-final, while 1979 and 1993 Finnish Eurovision entrant Katri Helena performed in the second semi-final, and 1972 Finnish Eurovision entrant Päivi Paunu and Kim Floor performed in the third semi-final.

Semi-final 1 – 20 January 2007
R/O	Artist	Song	Televote	Result
1	Jani and Jetsetters	"Etupenkillä"	1,628	—N/a
2	Hanna Pakarinen	"Tell Me What to Do"	3,777	—N/a
3	Thunderstone	"Forevermore"	2,825	—N/a
4	Jani and Jetsetters	"Musta sulhanen"	1,861	Qualified
5	Hanna Pakarinen	"Leave Me Alone"	8,459	Qualified
6	Thunderstone	"Face In the Mirror"	5,056	Qualified

Semi-final 2 – 27 January 2007
R/O	Artist	Song	Televote	Result
1	Jukka Kuoppamäki	"Levitä siivet"	2,277	Qualified
2	Humane	"Bubble Shell"	1,119	—N/a
3	Katra	"Tietäjä"	2,425	Qualified
4	Jukka Kuoppamäki	"Pikajuna"	1,440	—N/a
5	Humane	"Plane Away"	4,301	Qualified
6	Katra	"Vaaratar"	797	—N/a

Semi-final 3 – 3 February 2007
R/O	Artist	Song	Televote	Result
1	Johanna Kurkela	"Olet uneni kaunein"	1,661	Qualified
2	Kentala	"Merry-Go-Round"	584	—N/a
3	Lovex	"Anyone, Anymore"	4,510	Qualified
4	Johanna Kurkela	"Jossain metsäin takana"	914	—N/a
5	Kentala	"Left My Heart Behind"	1,044	Qualified
6	Lovex	"Wild and Violent"	881	—N/a

Semi-final 4 – 10 February 2007
R/O	Artist	Song	Televote	Result
1	Laura	"Kosketa mua"	1,322	—N/a
2	Beats and Styles feat. Anorah	"See the Signs"	515	Qualified
3	Jann Wilde and Rose Avenue	"Rock'n Roll Dreams"	953	Qualified
4	Laura	"Take a Chance"	2,162	Qualified
5	Beats and Styles	"Take It Back"	351	—N/a
6	Jann Wilde and Rose Avenue	"Cinnamon"	673	—N/a

==== Final ====
The final took place on 17 February 2007 at the Holiday Club Caribia in Turku where the twelve entries that qualified from the preceding four semi-finals competed. The winner was selected over two rounds of public televoting. In the first round, the top three from the twelve competing entries qualified to the second round, the superfinal. In the superfinal, "Leave Me Alone" performed by Hanna Pakarinen was selected as the winner. A total of 261,679 votes were cast during the show: 95,736 in the final and 165,943 in the superfinal. In addition to the performances of the competing entries, the interval act featured Danny performing his 1975 Finnish Eurovision national final entry "Seikkailija".

Final – 17 February 2007
R/O	Artist	Song	Televote	Place
1	Hanna Pakarinen	"Leave Me Alone"	16,937	1
2	Beats and Styles feat. Anorah	"See the Signs"	2,512	12
3	Jani and Jetsetters	"Musta sulhanen"	3,507	11
4	Lovex	"Anyone, Anymore"	15,112	2
5	Jukka Kuoppamäki	"Levitä siivet"	4,776	10
6	Jann Wilde and Rose Avenue	"Rock'n Roll Dreams"	7,907	5
7	Katra	"Tietäjä"	5,281	8
8	Laura	"Take a Chance"	8,988	4
9	Humane	"Plane Away"	6,828	7
10	Thunderstone	"Face in the Mirror"	10,997	3
11	Johanna Kurkela	"Olet uneni kaunein"	7,791	6
12	Kentala	"Left My Heart Behind"	5,100	9

Superfinal – 17 February 2007
R/O	Artist	Song	Televote	Place
1	Hanna Pakarinen	"Leave Me Alone"	73,052	1
2	Lovex	"Anyone, Anymore"	38,175	3
3	Thunderstone	"Face in the Mirror"	54,716	2

== At Eurovision ==
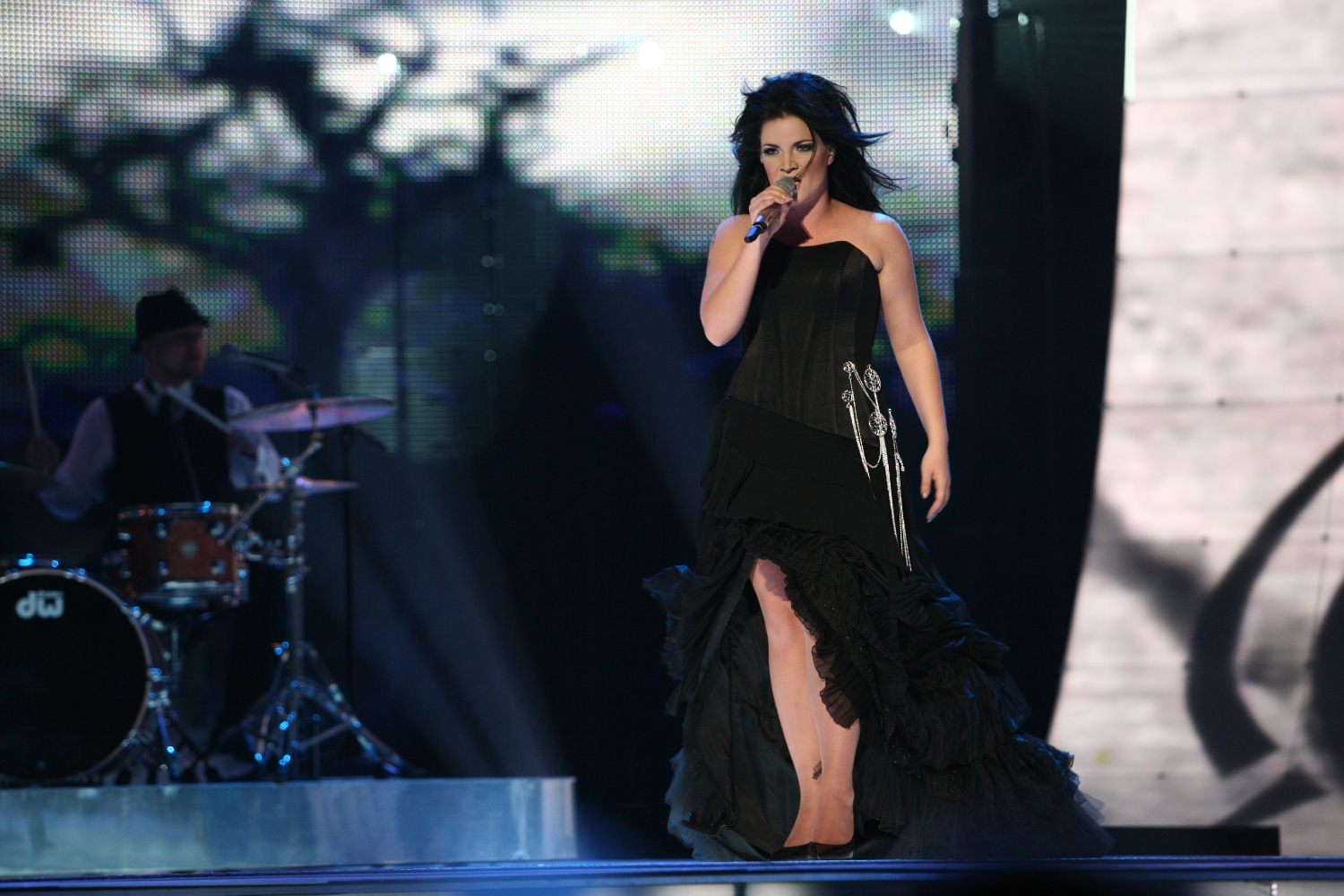
Hanna Pakarinen performing at the Eurovision Song Contest

According to Eurovision rules, all nations with the exceptions of the host country, the "Big Four" (France, Germany, Spain and the United Kingdom) and the ten highest placed finishers in the 2006 contest are required to qualify from the semi-final in order to compete for the final; the top ten countries from the semi-final progress to the final. As the host country, Finland automatically qualified to compete in the final on 12 May 2007. In addition to their participation in the final, Finland is also required to broadcast and vote in the semi-final on 10 May 2007.

The semi-final and the final were televised in Finland on Yle TV2 with commentary in Finnish by Heikki Paasonen and Ellen Jokikunnas with the addition of Asko Murtomäki in the final. The three shows were also broadcast on Yle FST5 with commentary in Swedish by Thomas Lundin as well as via radio with Finnish commentary by Sanna Pirkkalainen and Jorma Hietamäki on Yle Radio Suomi. Yle appointed Laura Voutilainen, who represented Finland in the 2002 contest, as its spokesperson to announce the Finnish votes during the final.

=== Final ===
Hanna Pakarinen took part in technical rehearsals on 7 and 8 May, followed by dress rehearsals on 11 and 12 May. During the running order draw for the semi-final and final on 12 March 2007, Finland was placed to perform in position 5 in the final, following the entry from Ireland and before the entry from Macedonia. The Finnish performance featured Hanna Pakarinen performing in a black dress joined by a guitarist, bassist, keyboardist and drummer. The LED screens displayed three artificial flames and colours that transitioned between black, blue, white, red and orange. The performance also featured several effects including smoke, pyrotechnics and a wind machine. The four musicians that joined Hanna Pakarinen on stage were Jaakko Kääriäinen, Jyrki Alanen, Mikko Määttä and Risto Niinikoski. Finland placed seventeenth in the final, scoring 53 points.

=== Voting ===
Below is a breakdown of points awarded to Finland and awarded by Finland in the semi-final and grand final of the contest. The nation awarded its 12 points to Iceland in the semi-final and to Serbia in the final of the contest.

==== Points awarded to Finland ====
Points awarded to Finland (Final)
Score	Country
12 points	Iceland; Sweden
10 points	
8 points	
7 points	Andorra
6 points	Estonia
5 points	Lithuania
4 points	Denmark; Norway
3 points	
2 points	
1 point	Belarus; Germany; Switzerland

==== Points awarded by Finland ====
Points awarded by Finland (Semi-final)
Score	Country
12 points	Iceland
10 points	Hungary
8 points	Serbia
7 points	Turkey
6 points	Estonia
5 points	Andorra
4 points	Georgia
3 points	Latvia
2 points	Bulgaria
1 point	Norway

Points awarded by Finland (Final)
Score	Country
12 points	Serbia
10 points	Hungary
8 points	Sweden
7 points	Georgia
6 points	Ukraine
5 points	Bulgaria
4 points	Turkey
3 points	Russia
2 points	Moldova
1 point	Germany
