= Raymond Ebanks =

London-born Finnish rapper (born 1970))

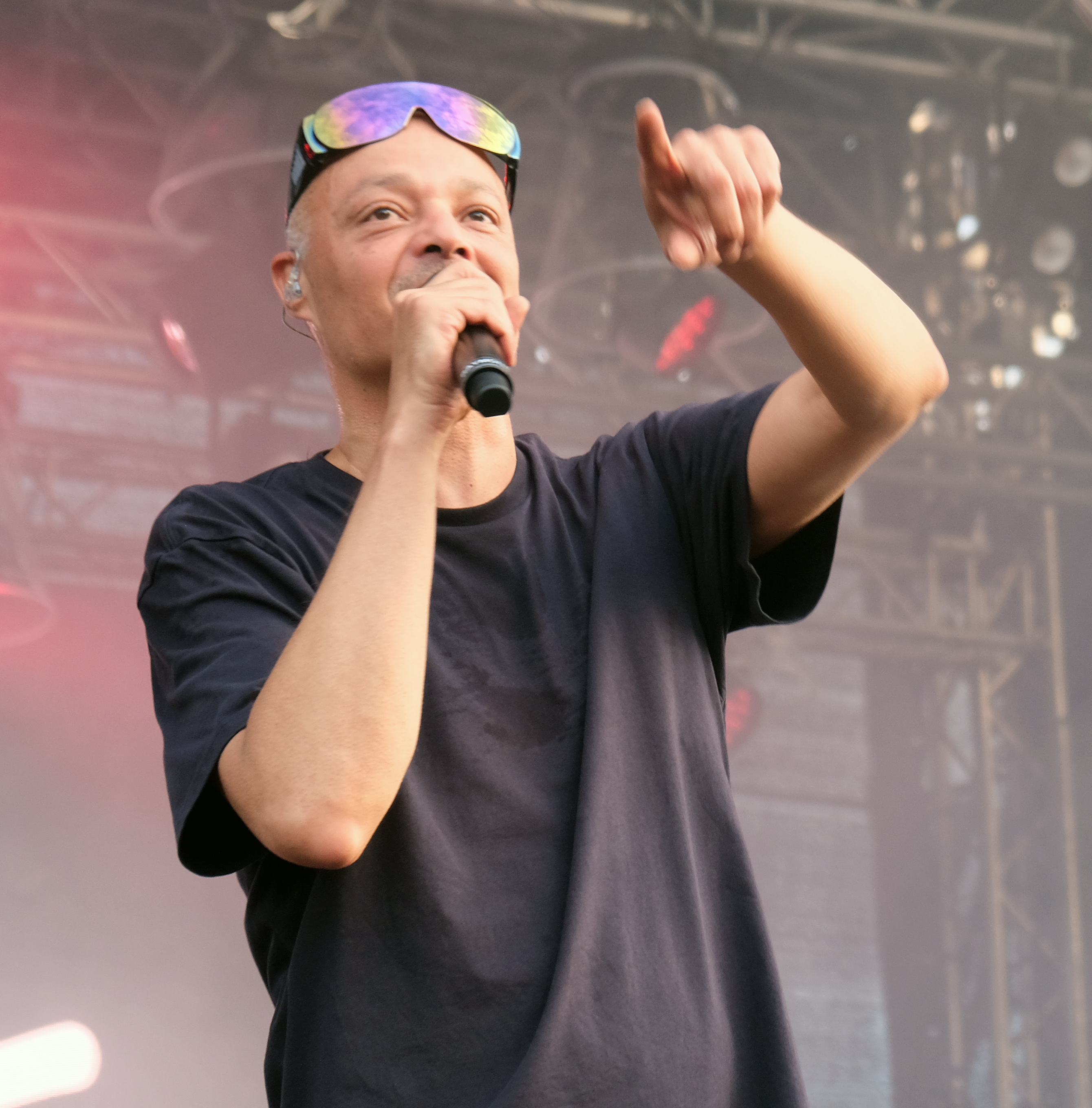
- Ebanks in 2022

Background information
- Also known as: B.O. Dubb, B.O.W.
- Born: Raymond Anthony Ebanks; 2 January 1970 (age 56); London, England
- Origin: Helsinki, Finland
- Genres: Hip hop; techno; breakbeat; electro; drum and bass; electronic
- Occupations: Rapper; singer
- Years active: 1994–2006, 2011, 2017–present

Raymond Anthony Ebanks, also known as B.O. Dubb (formerly known as B.O.W.; born 2 January 1970), is a Finnish rapper and singer best known as the frontman of the hip-hop group the Bomfunk MC's.

== Early career ==
Ebanks was born in London to a British father of Jamaican and English extraction and a Finnish mother. He moved to Kontula, Helsinki, Finland, with his parents at an early age. He began recording music as a teenager in the early 1990s as part of the Finnish hip hop group The Master Brothers, who often performed over DJ sets at clubs. Whilst no recordings were made, some of their performances were recorded, and have emerged online. Around this time, Ebanks performed guest raps on the song "Cryin' Out" by Rama (1994).

== Soup De Loop ==
In 1995, Ebanks teamed up with longtime producer Jaakko "JS16" Salovaara and singer Mari Vesala to form the pop group Soup De Loop, and signed to the now defunct Blue Bubble Records. Their music was a combination of female sung house and G-funk hip hop music, with Vesala singing and Ebanks providing raps. The group released an album, Brainspotting in 1997, as well as several singles including "Keep On Doing", which was a hit in Finland and appeared on several dance compilations around the time. Despite this, the group did not have any success outside Finland. Vesala left the group some time after the album was released, and they broke up rather than look for another singer.

== Bomfunk MC's: 1999–2005 ==
After the breakup of Soup De Loop, Ebanks and JS16 teamed up with DJ Ismo "DJ Gismo" Lappalainen to form Bomfunk MC's. The band were signed to Sony Music Finland due to Blue Bubble Records going under. The band quickly became known for the breakdancing in their videos and the graffiti in their album cover designs, both things which contributed to their popularity. Despite the associations with breakdancing, the band did perform slower-paced hip hop songs as well and some more trancey material later on. The group released two albums with DJ Gismo - In Stereo and Burnin' Sneakers, and released a number of successful singles, the most notable of which being "Uprocking Beats" and "Freestyler". "Freestyler" in particular became the band's signature song, which they are still remembered for to this day.

The band remained popular in Finland and Europe, but lost popularity elsewhere and their last release in the UK was "Super Electric", whose parent album, Burnin' Sneakers was never released in the UK due to poor sales of the single. However, the band contributed the official World Cup 2002 song for Sweden "(Crack It) Something Goin' On", as well as contributed "Put Your Hands Up" and "We R Atomic" to the PlayStation game Firebugs, in which they appeared as playable characters. These appearances revived the band's popularity in the UK, but it was not enough for the album to be released there. DJ Gismo left Bomfunk MC's in 2002 in order to join the group Stonedeep. He was replaced by Skillsters duo, which consists of Riku Pentti (DJ) and Okke Komulainen (keyboards).

In 2004, JS16 guested on a number of songs by Beats and Styles. These have been erroneously credited as Bomfunk MC's songs, although the only real difference is the producer.

In 2005, the group signed to Universal/Polydor and recorded the album Reverse Psychology. This album was very different to the previous two, as it had far more of a straightforward hip hop sound, in that respect, more in common with the Soup De Loop material. The album was half produced by JS16, and the other half by Pentti and Komulainen. The band also experimented more with trance inspired songs such as "Hypnotic" and "Turn It Up", and dance-rock songs such as "No Way in Hell" and "Reverse Psychology". The album also featured a guest appearance from Kurtis Blow, of "The Breaks" fame. Whilst the album produced the big European hit "No Way in Hell", it quickly became rare and obscure, due to only being released in Scandinavia, Germany and Eastern Europe. DJ Gismo appears on the cover of the album despite not contributing to it, this is likely to be for marketing reasons.

A while after the release of the album, the group quietly split up, and Ebanks moved to Belgium. It has said this was due to Ebanks' desire to retire from the spotlight. JS16 has continued producing music.

== Post-Bomfunk MC's ==
Since Bomfunk MC's breakup, Ebanks has largely disappeared from the music industry, although he did guest on a few tracks.

In 2011, a Finnish rap compilation Rappiotaidetta: Suomiräpin vaippaikä was released, which features Ebanks performing a song entitled "Keijo ei pelaa" under the pseudonym Keijo K from 1990. It is possibly the only released recording of Ebanks rapping in Finnish.

In 2014, Soup De Loop's album Brainspotting appeared for digital download worldwide, after being an out of print and expensive Finland-only release for years. The masters were owned by Sony-BMG who had taken over the Blue Bubble Label on which the album was originally released.

== Discography ==
=== With Soup De Loop ===
==== Albums ====
- Brainspotting (1997)

==== Singles ====
- "Keep On Doing" (1995)
- "Love the Way" (1996)
- "I Gotta Get Away" (1997)
- "What Was Said and Done" (1997)

=== With Bomfunk MC's ===
==== Albums ====
- 1999 - In Stereo (Sony Music/Epidrome) (worldwide)
- 2002 - Burnin' Sneakers (Sony Music/Epidrome) (Europe only [not UK])
- 2004 - Reverse Psychology (Universal Music/Polydor) (Europe only [not UK])

==== Singles ====
- "Uprocking Beats (1998/1999) (UK, Germany, Sweden, Finland and Australia)
- "Freestyler" (1999 Finland only) (2000 worldwide)
- "B-Boys & Flygirls" (1999) (Finland, Denmark, Sweden, Germany, Australia)
- "Sky's the Limit" (1999) (promo only, Finland only)
- "Rocking Just to Make Ya Move" (1999) (Finland only)
- "Other Emcees" (1999) (Finland only)
- "Super Electric" (2001) (UK and Europe - this was the band's last single in the UK)
- "Live Your Life", feat. Max C (2002)
- "(Crack It!) Something Goin' On", feat. Jessica Folcker (Finland only, although it did appear internationally on the "FIFA World Cup 2002 soundtrack album").
- "Back to Back", feat. Z-MC, CD Single, (2002) (Finland only)
- "No Way in Hell" (2004) (Europe excluding UK)
- "Hypnotic", feat. Elena Mady (2005) (Scandinavia only)
- "Turn It Up", feat. Anna Nordell (2005) (radio promo)

=== Solo ===
==== Appears on ====
- Dynamite (CD, single, enhanced) Epic 2004
- Kool Kat Kollabo EP (2xLP) Kool Kat Records 2003
- This Is... Beats and Styles (CD, album) Epic 2003
- We're Not Ready Yet (CD, album) Epic 2004
- For My Peoples (CD) Kool Kat Records 2006
