= Summer Sound Festival =

Electronic music festival held in Helsinki, Finland

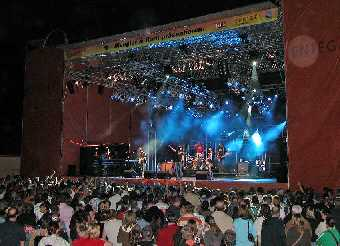
- Genre: EDM
- Dates: Varies
- Locations: Helsinki, Finland
- Years active: 2011–present
- Organiser: Summer Sound Festival Oy
- Website: www.summersound.net

Summer Sound Festival is an electronic music festival that is held in Helsinki, Finland. It has been organized since 2012 by Heikki Liimatainen and Alex Kunnari, the founders of Summer Sound Festival Oy. However, the very first festival was held on 2011 at Suvilahti, Helsinki, before it became a brand. It was just one day event. In 2014, Summer Sound Festival was considered the biggest EDM festival in Northern Europe.

== Artists ==
In 2011, festival line up included: Chicane, Above & Beyond, Roger Sanchez, Robbie Rivera, Kaskade and Judge Jules.

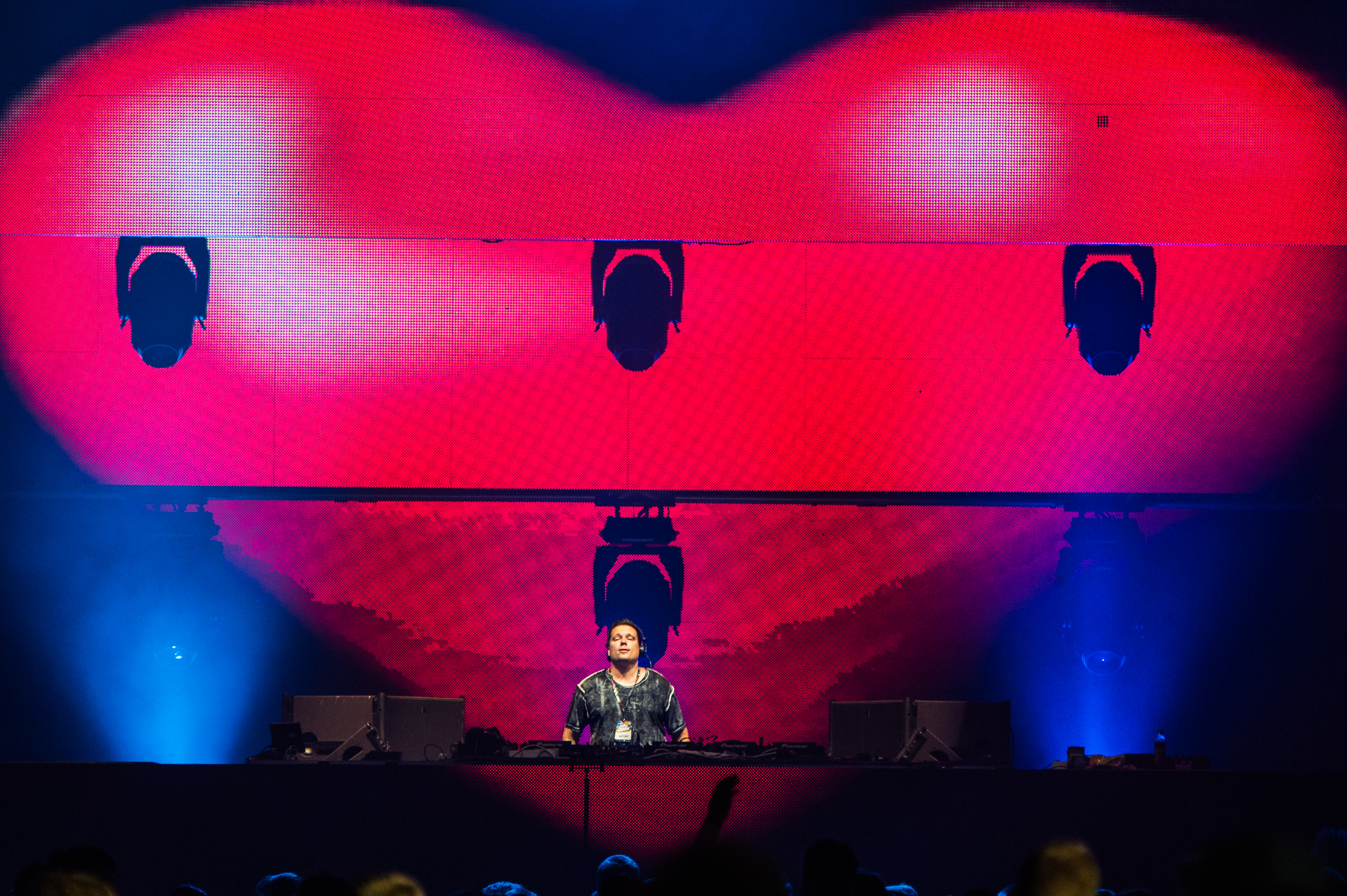
Alex Kunnari at Summer Sound Festival 2012

It was a three-day festival, that was held at Helsinki Exhibition and Convention Centre with following line up: Armin van Buuren, Tiësto, Avicii, Hardwell, Alex Kunnari, Heikki L, Hed Kandi presents Ibiza 2012, Fedde le Grand, Dash Berlin, Markus Schulz, W&W, MYNC, Maison & Dragen, Dallas Superstars, Andy Moor, K-System, Richard Durand, Orion, Something Good, Jay Mellin, DJ Dosse, Gareth Emery, Tom Fall, Axwell, Funkagenda, Chris Lake, Todd Terry, Mr A & Orkidea, Lange, DJ Sampl and Sergei Shkuroff. Tickets were sold out just in a few days. ATB cancelled his show that year and been replaced by Axl Smith.

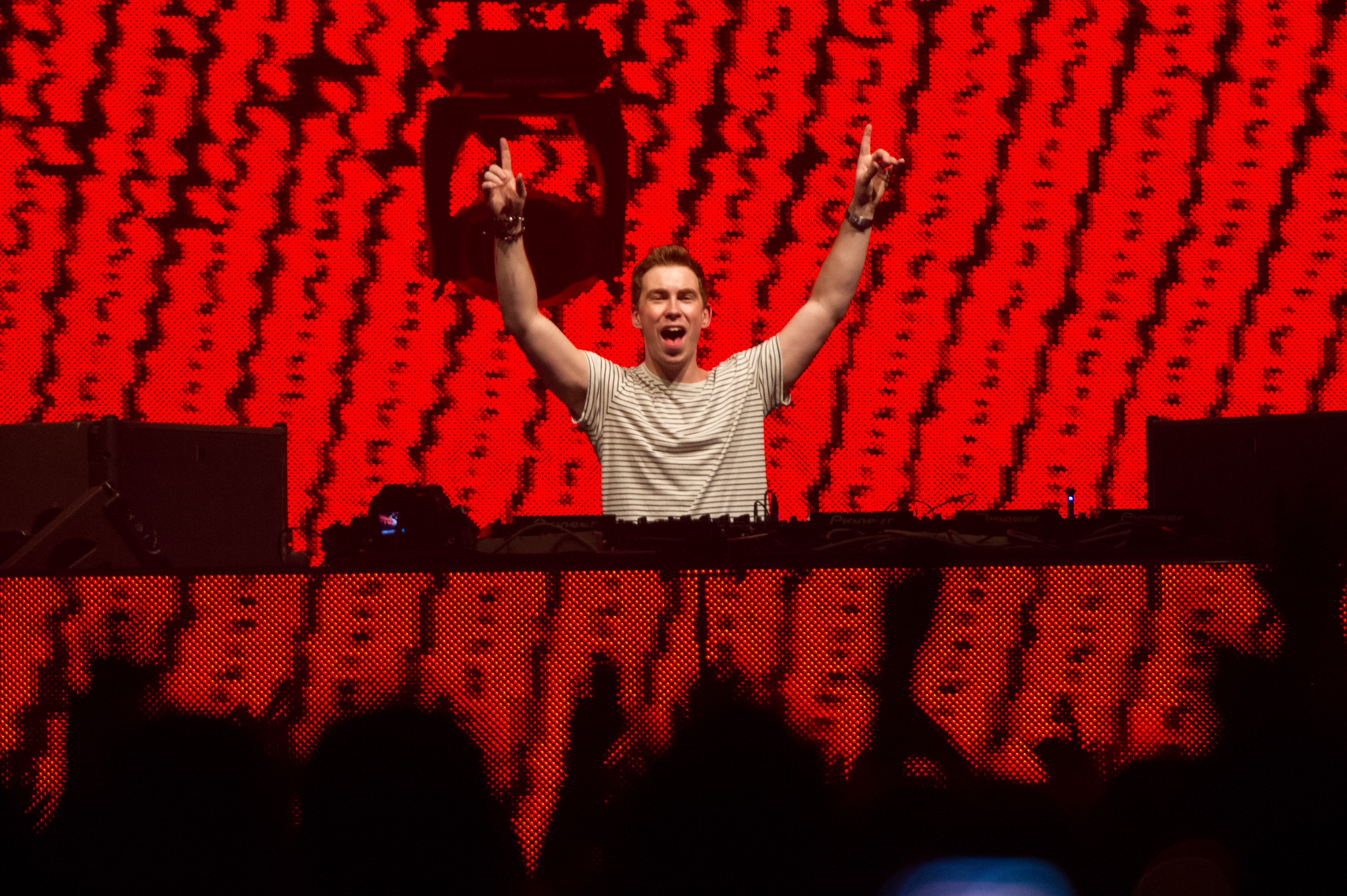
Hardwell at Summer Sound Festival 2012

In 2013, Summer Sound Festival was hosted at the same place. It was a three-day festival. Line up: Otto Knows, Tiësto, Hardwell, Basto, Knife Party, Nicky Romero, Gareth Emery, Axwell, Markus Schulz, W&W, Above & Beyond, Steve Angello, Sander van Doorn, Faithless, Bingo Players, Orkidea, K-System, Orion, Dosse, Something Good, Heikki L, Heavyweight DJs, DJ Spinny, Alex Kunnari and Tom Fall. Bingo Players had to cancel the event due to illness of one of the members.

In 2014, Summer Sound Festival was hosted at the same place. It was a three-day festival. Line up: Avicii, Axwell, Aly & Fila, Arty, Alpha^{2}, Benny Benassi, Ben Gold, Blasterjaxx, Cosmic Gate, Danny Tenaglia, Dash Berlin, DVBBS, Eric Prydz, Geck-O, Hard Rock Sofa, Laidback Luke, Marco V, Markus Schulz, Noisecontrollers, Paul Van Dyk, Paul Oakenfold, Pegboard Nerds, Sandro Silva, Sander van Doorn, Steve Angello, Sunnery James & Ryan Marciano, Tiësto, Wildstylez, Alex Kunnari, Dosse, Efo, HeavyWeight, JS16, Jeremy Folderol, Joonas Hahmo, K-System, Maison & Dragen, Orion, Orkidea, Rico Tubbs, Super8 & Tab, Tom Fall and You Are Me. Eric Prydz and Steve Angello had to cancel their show for unknown reasons.

== See also ==
- List of electronic music festivals
- List of trance festivals
