= I Know There's Something Going On =

1982 single by Frida

- UK vinyl-single picture sleeve

Single by Frida

from the album Something's Going On
- B-side: "Threnody" (album version); You Know What I Mean" (2015 limited edition version)
- Released: 6 August 1982
- Recorded: 1982
- Genre: Pop rock; hard rock
- Length: 5:29 (album version); 4:07 (single version)
- Label: Polar
- Songwriter: Russ Ballard
- Producer: Phil Collins

Frida singles chronology
| "Fernando" (1976) | "I Know There's Something Going On" (1982) | "To Turn the Stone" (1982) |

Music video
- "I Know There's Something Going On" on YouTube

Audio sample
- "I Know There's Something Going On": file; help

"I Know There's Something Going On" is a song by the Swedish singer and ABBA member Anni-Frid "Frida" Lyngstad. Released on 6 August 1982 as her debut English-language single and her first solo single since her version of "Fernando" in 1975, it was the lead single to her third studio album and her first in the English language, Something's Going On (1982). It was penned by Russ Ballard and produced by Phil Collins.

Being released shortly before ABBA's hiatus, "I Know There's Something Going On" proved to be a major hit for Frida, peaking atop the music charts of Belgium and Switzerland and made the top ten in multiple European countries and Australia. It also became a top-20 US hit, becoming the 20th-best-selling single of 1983 on the Billboard Hot 100, on which the song peaked at number 13.

== Background ==
Recording began in ABBA's Polar Music Studio, Stockholm, in February 1982. Frida recorded the album during the last year of ABBA in the 20th century. At the time of recording this song/album, Frida wanted to distance herself from "the typical ABBA pop sound". "I Know There's Something Going On" was written by Russ Ballard and produced by Genesis drummer and singer Phil Collins, who also played drums on the song. The backing vocals are sung by Lyngstad herself and Collins. A one-hour TV documentary about the making of the album and this song is included in Frida - The DVD. The whole recording process, from day one in the studio to the release party, was filmed by Swedish television broadcaster SVT. This documentary includes interviews with Lyngstad and Collins, Björn and Benny from ABBA, as well as all the musicians involved with the album.

== Reception ==
=== Critical ===
Charles Shaar Murray for UK-based magazine New Musical Express described the single as "a Phil Collins production replete with big threatening synthesised drums and some dubby little echoes here and there". Neil Tennant for Smash Hits gave the single a mixed review, writing that "although it successfully lodges in the brain", it "is cold and thin with only one memorable line constantly repeated." Simon Tebbutt, writing for Record Mirror, described the track as "unfinished" and a "nasal drip durge" with a lack of harmonies and hooks.

=== Commercial ===
"I Know There's Something Going On" became a major chart success for Frida. The single reached the number one position in Belgium and Switzerland. The track reached the top ten throughout most of Europe– including a number three peak in ABBA's native Sweden–as well as in Australia and South Africa. It had longevity in the United States, where it reached number 13 on the Billboard Hot 100 and spent 29 weeks in total, an unusually lengthy time in the chart at the time. This was reflected in the 1983 year end chart, where it was ranked at number 20 despite not peaking within the top ten. An exception of the song's success was in the United Kingdom, traditionally a popular market for ABBA, where it failed to enter the top forty, peaking at number 43 on the UK singles chart.

== Music video ==
The music video was directed by Stuart Orme and filmed at several locations in London, England in early July 1982. The video, which received heavy promotion on MTV due to the worldwide success of the song, shows Frida in a relationship with a man who works as a photographer. She then discovers through photos taken by a private investigator that the man is seeing another woman who had modeled for him. The rest of the video consists of Frida spying on the two.

== Credits ==
- Frida – vocals
- Phil Collins – drums, backing vocals, producer
- Daryl Stuermer – guitars
- Mo Foster – bass
- Peter Robinson – keyboards

== Charts ==
=== Weekly charts ===
Weekly chart performance for "I Know There's Something Going On"
| Chart (1982–1983) | Peak position |
|---|---|
| Australia (Kent Music Report) | 5 |
| Austria (Ö3 Austria Top 40) | 3 |
| Belgium (Ultratop 50 Flanders) | 1 |
| Canada Top Singles (RPM) | 30 |
| Finland (Suomen virallinen lista) | 7 |
| France (SNEP) | 4 |
| Ireland (IRMA) | 23 |
| Netherlands (Dutch Top 40) | 3 |
| Netherlands (Single Top 100) | 3 |
| Norway (VG-lista) | 3 |
| South Africa (Springbok Radio) | 5 |
| Spain (AFYVE) | 29 |
| Sweden (Sverigetopplistan) | 3 |
| Switzerland (Schweizer Hitparade) | 1 |
| UK Singles (Official Charts) | 43 |
| US Billboard Hot 100 | 13 |
| US Rock Top Tracks (Billboard) | 17 |
| US Cash Box Top 100 Singles | 14 |
| US AOR/Hot Tracks (Radio & Records) | 10 |
| US Contemporary Hit Radio (Radio & Records) | 9 |
| West Germany (GfK) | 5 |

=== Year-end charts ===
1982 year-end chart performance for "I Know There's Something Going On"
| Chart (1982) | Position |
|---|---|
| Australia (Kent Music Report) | 50 |
| Belgium (Ultratop 50 Flanders) | 32 |
| Netherlands (Dutch Top 40) | 46 |
| Netherlands (Single Top 100) | 45 |
| West Germany (Media Control) | 75 |

1983 year-end chart performance for "I Know There's Something Going On"
| Chart (1983) | Position |
|---|---|
| US Billboard Hot 100 | 20 |
| US Cash Box Top 100 | 90 |
| US Top 40 (Gavin Report) | 81 |
| US AOR/Hot Tracks (Radio & Records) | 53 |
| US Contemporary Hit Radio (Radio & Records) | 73 |

== Cover versions ==
=== Bomfunk MC's version ===
"(Crack It) Something Going On"

Single by Bomfunk MC's featuring Jessica Folcker

from the album The Official Album of the 2002 FIFA World Cup
- B-side: "PamPam"
- Released: 10 June 2002
- Genre: Electro-pop
- Length: 3:47
- Label: Epidrome
- Composers: Russ Ballard; Jaakko Salovaara
- Lyricists: Russ Ballard; Raymond Ebanks
- Producer: JS16

Bomfunk MC's singles chronology
| "Live Your Life" (2002) | "(Crack It) Something Going On" (2002) | "Back to Back" (2002) |

Jessica Folcker singles chronology
| "Miracles" (2001) | "(Crack It) Something Going On" (2002) | "Du kunde ha varit med mig" (2005) |

Music video
- "(Crack It) Something Going On" on YouTube

In 2002, Finnish hip hop group Bomfunk MC's used the song as a basis for their track "(Crack It) Something Going On", originally included on The Official Album of the 2002 FIFA World Cup. This version features Swedish singer Jessica Folcker performing the choruses and includes addition writing from Bomfunk MC's members Jaakko Salovaara (music) and Raymond Ebanks (lyrics). "Something Goin' On" was released a single in June 2002 and charted throughout mainland Europe, entering the top 10 in Finland, Germany, Norway, and Sweden. A music video was made for the song, directed by Juuso "Uzi" Syrjä.

==== Track listings ====
Scandinavian CD single

1. "(Crack It) Something Going On" – 3:47
2. "PamPam" – 4:20

European maxi-CD single

1. "(Crack It) Something Going On" (original) – 3:47
2. "(Crack It) Something Going On" (Beats'n'Styles remix) – 4:45
3. "(Crack It) Something Going On" (extended) – 4:52
4. "PamPam" – 4:20
5. "Live Your Life" (video) – 3:53

==== Credits and personnel ====
Credits are taken from the European maxi-CD single liner notes.

Studio

- Mixed at 16 Inch Studios (Helsinki, Finland)

Personnel

- Russ Ballard – music, lyrics
- Jaakko Salovaara – music
- Raymond Ebanks – lyrics, vocals (as B.O.W.)
- Jessica Folcker – vocals
- DJ Gismo – turntables
- JS16 – programming, production, mixing
- Edgar Tompson – mixing
- Jani Tolin – artwork design
- Matti Pyykkö – photography

==== Charts ====
Weekly charts

2002 weekly chart performance for "(Crack It) Something Going On"
| Chart (2002) | Peak position |
|---|---|
| Austria (Ö3 Austria Top 40) | 19 |
| Belgium (Ultratop 50 Flanders) | 31 |
| Europe (Eurochart Hot 100) | 32 |
| Finland (Suomen virallinen lista) | 3 |
| Germany (GfK) | 10 |
| Greece (IFPI) | 18 |
| Italy (FIMI) | 15 |
| Norway (VG-lista) | 2 |
| Romania (Romanian Top 100) | 33 |
| Sweden (Sverigetopplistan) | 4 |
| Switzerland (Schweizer Hitparade) | 70 |

2025 weekly chart performance for "(Crack It) Something Going On"
| Chart (2025) | Peak position |
|---|---|
| Poland (Polish Airplay Top 100) | 72 |

Year-end charts

Year-end chart performance for "(Crack It) Something Going On"
| Chart (2002) | Position |
|---|---|
| Germany (Media Control) | 93 |
| Sweden (Hitlistan) | 63 |

==== Certifications ====
Certifications for "(Crack It) Something Going On"
| Region | Certification | Certified units/sales |
|---|---|---|
| Norway (IFPI Norway) | Gold | |

=== Other covers ===
- In 2006, American electronic rock band Luxxury covered the song on their debut album Rock and Roll is Evil.
- In 2006, Tre Lux covered the song on their cover album A Strange Gathering
- In 2007, German band Wild Frontier covered the song for their album Bite the Bullet.
- In 2009, American electronic group Sleepthief covered the song, featuring vocals by Roberta Carter-Harrison.
- In 2014, American Producer Straight-P covered the song featuring Elan Noelle on lead vocals.
- In 2015, Norwegian DJ and producer Hans-Peter Lindstrøm released his own remix of the song.
- In 2016, Norwegian heavy metal singer Jørn Lande and his solo band Jorn recorded their version of the song as the opening number of their cover album Heavy Rock Radio.
- In 2016, Swedisch DJ Duo Junge Junge remixed their version of the song as one popular remix of their remix pakage.

== Sampling ==
- In 1988, American hip hop trio Salt-N-Pepa sampled the guitar riff in the song "I Gotcha" on their second album A Salt with a Deadly Pepa.
- The drum line of Foo Fighters' "Erase/Replace" from their 2007 album Echoes, Silence, Patience and Grace was borrowed from this song.
- In 2009, the track was sampled by Canadian hip hop artist k-os for the song "Eye Know Something" from his album Yes!.
