= B-Boys & Flygirls =

1999 single by Bomfunk MC's

- 1999 Finnish CD artwork

Single by Bomfunk MC's

from the album In Stereo
- Released: 1999
- Length: 3:14 (radio edit)
- Label: Epidrome; Dance Division
- Songwriters: Jaakko Salovaara; Raymond Ebanks
- Producer: Jaakko Salovaara

Bomfunk MC's singles chronology
"Uprocking Beats" (1999)	"B-Boys & Flygirls" (1999)	"Freestyler" (2000)

Music video
- "B-Boys & Flygirls" on YouTube

"B-Boys & Flygirls" (also formatted as "B-Boys & Fly Girls") is a song by Finnish hip hop group Bomfunk MC's that was released as the second single from their debut studio album, In Stereo. It was originally released in 1999, becoming a hit in their native Finland. Following the worldwide success of "Freestyler" the following year, the single was re-released as the "Y2K Mix" and became another hit for the group, charting within the top 20 in several mainland European countries and Australia. It was not released in the United Kingdom, where "Uprocking Beats" was chosen as the follow-up single instead.

== Chart performance ==
Originally released in Finland in 1999, "B-Boys & Flygirls" debuted and peaked at number five on the Finnish Singles Chart, staying at that position for two weeks and spending six more weeks in the top 10. It did not begin to experience success outside Finland until "Freestyler" was released later in the year in Scandinavia. It first appeared on the Swedish Singles Chart in April 2000, debuting at its peak of number three, a rank it sustained for three weeks. It was the country's 26th-highest-selling single of the year and was certified gold for shipping over 15,000 units. The following month, it charted in Denmark, peaking at number six. In July, it garnered success in Benelux, attaining peaks of number four in Flanders, number 13 in the Netherlands, and number 31 in Wallonia.

By this time, "Freestyler" had become a chart-topping hit across Europe, and a new version of "B-Boys & Flygirls" called the "Y2K Mix" was issued as a maxi-single on 11 September 2000. Following this release, the single charted in several other countries for the first time in late September and early October. In German-speaking Europe, it reached the top 20 in Austria, Germany, and Switzerland, while in Greece and Spain, it peaked at number nine in both nations. On the Eurochart Hot 100, "B-Boys & Flygirls" repeatedly entered and exited the listing between May and December 2000, climbing to a peak of number 51 in mid-October. The track also became a hit in Australia, rising to number seven on 8 October 2000 and staying on the ARIA Chart for 19 weeks, going on to earn a Platinum record and ending the year as Australia's 47th-most-successful hit.

== Track listings ==
Finnish maxi-single (1999)

1. "B-Boys & Flygirls" (radio edit) – 3:14
2. "B-Boys & Flygirls" (JS16 Sound Design) – 6:42
3. "B-Boys & Flygirls" (DJ Gismo Goes Funky Mix) – 4:00
4. "B-Boys & Flygirls" (Missing Link Remix) – 5:12
5. "B-Boys & Flygirls" (original version) – 4:20
6. "B-Boys & Flygirls" (Jori Hulkkonen Deep 'N' Smooth Remix) – 7:25

Danish maxi-single (2000)

1. "B-Boys & Flygirls" (Katapult Allstars Remix) – 3:28
2. "B-Boys & Flygirls" (Katapult Allstars Clubmix) – 5:02
3. "B-Boys & Flygirls" (Y2K Mix) – 3:14

European 12-inch single (2000)

A. "B-Boys & Flygirls"
B. "B-Boys & Flygirls" (Westbams Technolectro Mix) – 5:57

German maxi-single (2000)

1. "B-Boys & Flygirls" (Y2K Mix) – 3:16
2. "1, 2, 3, 4" (featuring J.A.K.) – 4:06
3. "B-Boys & Flygirls" (Motor Funk Remix) – 3:47
4. "B-Boys & Flygirls" (Westbams Technolectro Mix) – 5:57

Y2K maxi-single (2000)

1. "B-Boys & Flygirls" (Y2K Mix) – 3:14
2. "B-Boys & Flygirls" (Original) – 4:20
3. "B-Boys & Flygirls" (JS16 Sound Design) – 6:41
4. "B-Boys & Flygirls" (DJ Gismo Goes Funky Mix) – 4:00

== Charts ==
=== Weekly charts ===
Chart (1999–2000)	Peak position
Australia (ARIA)	7
Austria (Ö3 Austria Top 40)	14
Belgium (Ultratop 50 Flanders)	4
Belgium (Ultratop 50 Wallonia)	31
Denmark (IFPI)	6
Europe (Eurochart Hot 100)	51
Finland (Suomen virallinen lista)	5
France (SNEP)	68
Germany (GfK)	18
Greece (IFPI)	9
Netherlands (Dutch Top 40)	13
Netherlands (Single Top 100)	14
Spain (Promusicae)	9
Sweden (Sverigetopplistan)	3
Switzerland (Schweizer Hitparade)	20

=== Year-end charts ===
Chart (2000)	Position
Australia (ARIA)	47
Belgium (Ultratop 50 Flanders)	44
Denmark (IFPI)	42
Sweden (Hitlistan)	26

== Certifications ==
Region	Certification	Certified units/sales
Australia (ARIA)	Platinum	70,000^{^}
Sweden (GLF)	Gold	15,000^{^}
^{^} Shipments figures based on certification alone.
