= Firebugs (video game) =

2002 video game

- Developer: Attention to Detail
- Publisher: Sony Computer Entertainment
- Platform: PlayStation
- Release: EU: 18 October 2002
- Genre: Racing
- Modes: Single-player, multiplayer

Firebugs is a 2002 racing video game developed by Attention to Detail and published by Sony Computer Entertainment for the PlayStation. As it was released late into the console's lifespan and the PlayStation 2 had been out for 2 years, it was only released in Europe.

== Gameplay ==
Screenshot of a race in Firebugs

The player takes control of one of five vehicles in a futuristic race where speeds can reach over 400 miles per hour. Weapons and defences are used to help the player win races. The game modes include 1 player mode where the player can race on 25 tracks in 5 distinct worlds (Archipelago, Droid Gardens, Sky Dunes, Sky Port and Cloud City). There is 2 player mode which consists of the same basics as in one player mode.

== Soundtrack ==
The game's soundtrack includes music from hip-hop group Bomfunk MCs, whose songs "We R Atomic" and "Put Ya Hands Up" are featured. These are of note because the album Burnin' Sneakers was not released in the UK, and so the songs have correlation to this game for many UK fans.

== Critical reception ==
Firebugs received positive reviews in the Evening Chronicle, the Birmingham Mail, and the Waikato Times.
