= Reverse Psychology (album) =

Studio album by Bomfunk MC's
- Released: September 19, 2004
- Recorded: JS16 Studios in Finland
- Label: Polydor Records
- Producer: JS16

Bomfunk MC's chronology
Burnin' Sneakers (2002)	Reverse Psychology (2004)

Reverse Psychology is the third and final studio album by Bomfunk MC's, released on September 19, 2004, through Polydor Records.

The album charted at #10 on the Official Finnish Charts.

== Track listing ==
No.	Title	Length
1.	"Hypnotic" (feat. Elena Mady)	4:04
2.	"Ladies & Fellas"	3:57
3.	"No Way in Hell"	3:43
4.	"Reverse Psychology"	3:56
5.	"Hey Everybody" (feat. Kurtis Blow & Max'C)	3:57
6.	"Funky Things"	3:23
7.	"Track Star"	4:31
8.	"Turn It Up" (feat. Anna Nordell)	3:57
9.	"Foxy Lady"	3:32
10.	"Irresistible"	3:32
11.	"Mosquito"	3:08
12.	"Obvious"	3:58

== Personnel ==
=== Bomfunk MC's ===
- Raymond Ebanks (a.k.a. B.O.W. or B.O. Dubb) - vocals
- Riku Pentti (DJ Infekto) - DJ, turntables, samples, keyboards, producer
- Ville Mäkinen (a.k.a. Mr Wily) - bass, keyboards
- Ari Toikka (a.k.a. A.T.) - drums, percussion

=== Additional personnel ===
- Jaakko Salovaara (a.k.a. JS16) - producer
- Okke Komulainen - keyboards
