= Lauri Kuoppamäki =

Finnish businessman and politician (1877–1935)

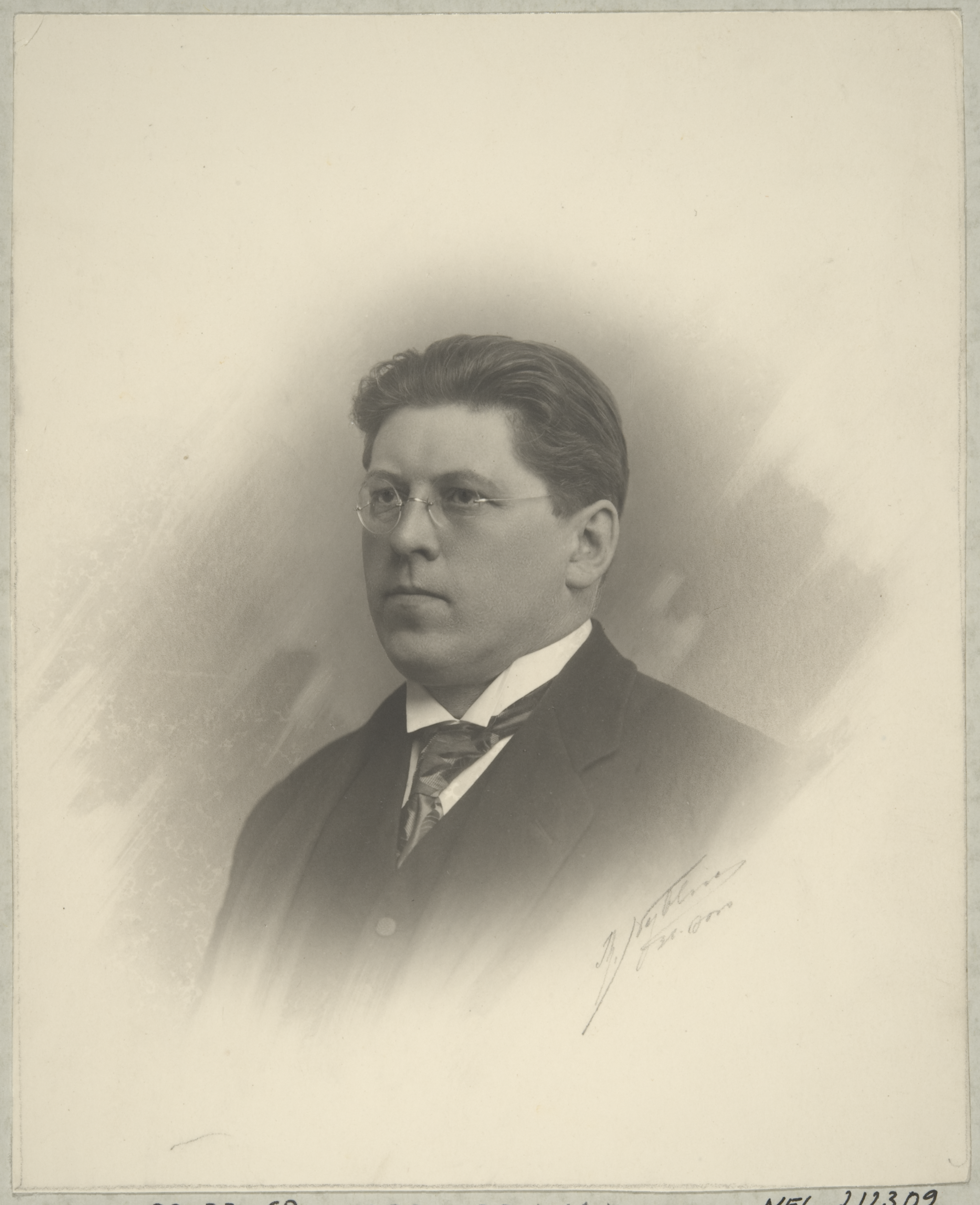
Lauri Kuoppamäki

Lauri Kuoppamäki (23 January 1877 – 2 January 1935; surname until 1924 Mäkinen) was a Finnish businessman and politician, born in Alavus. He was a member of the Parliament of Finland from 1916 to 1917, representing the Agrarian League. Jukka Kuoppamäki is a grandson of Lauri Kuoppamäki.
