= Heikki Liimatainen =

Heikki Liimatainen may refer to:

- Heikki L, real name Heikki Liimatainen, Finnish musician
- Heikki Liimatainen (athlete) (1894-1980), Finnish runner
