= In Stereo (Bomfunk MC's album) =

1999 studio album by Bomfunk MC's

Studio album by Bomfunk MC's
- Released: 2 June 1999
- Studios: JS16 Studios, Turku
- Genres: Hip hop, breakbeat, electro, techno, drum and bass
- Length: 57:41
- Label: Sony Music Finland
- Producer: JS16

Bomfunk MC's chronology
In Stereo (1999)	Burnin' Sneakers (2002)

Alternative cover
- Special Edition

Singles from In Stereo
- 1. "Uprocking Beats" Released: 1998; 2. "B-Boys & Flygirls" Released: July 1999; 3. "Freestyler" Released: 30 October 1999

Professional ratings
Review scores
Source	Rating
AllMusic	3/5 stars

In Stereo is the debut studio album by the Finnish hip hop group Bomfunk MC's, released on 2 June 1999 through Sony Music Finland. The album reached No. 1 on that year's Finnish albums chart and remained on that chart for 69 weeks. "Freestyler" was released as a single and became a chart-topping hit worldwide during the first half of 2000, reaching No. 1 in eleven countries.

In the group's native Finland, the album won four Emma Awards in 1999 for best new band, best debut album, best song ("Freestyler"), and best producer (Jaakko Salovaara). In Stereo was certified Double Platinum in 1999, with 134,610 copies sold; it was the 27th best-selling album of all time in Finland as of 2013.

== Track listing ==
All tracks are written by JS16.

No.	Title	Length
1.	"Uprocking Beats"	3:41
2.	"Other Emcee's"	3:48
3.	"B-Boys & Flygirls"	3:14
4.	"Freestyler"	5:06
5.	"Rocking, Just to Make Ya Move"	3:45
6.	"Sky's the Limit" (feat. Kärtsy Hatakka)	3:58
7.	"Stir Up the Bass"	3:36
8.	"Fashion Styley" (feat. Mr. B from Bu Bu Man)	4:40
9.	"1, 2, 3, 4" (feat. J.A.K. from Cool Sheiks)	4:05
10.	"Rock, Rocking tha Spot"	3:15
11.	"In Stereo"	4:48
12.	"Uprocking Beats (JS 16 Sound Design)"	5:02
13.	"B-Boys & Flygirls (DJ Gismo Goes Funky Mix)"	4:01
14.	"Spoken Word"	4:42
Total length:		57:41

Special Edition track listing
No.	Title	Length
1.	"Uprocking Beats (JS16 Radio Mix)"	3:11
2.	"Other Emcees"	3:48
3.	"B-Boys & Flygirls (Y2K Mix)"	3:14
4.	"Freestyler"	5:06
5.	"Sky's the Limit" (feat. Kärtsy Hatakka)	3:57
6.	"Fashion Styley" (feat. Mr. B; lyrics by Rummy Nanji)	4:40
7.	"1,2,3,4" (feat. J.A.K.)	4:05
8.	"Rock, Rocking tha Spot"	3:13
9.	"B-Boys & Flygirls (Westbams Technolectro Mix)"	5:57
10.	"Freestyler (Dirty Rotten Scoundrels Surgical Spirit Mix)"	8:02
11.	"Stir Up the Bass"	3:37
12.	"B-Boys & Flygirls (Katapult All Stars Remix)"	3:27
13.	"Uprocking Beats (Utah Saints Alternative Acid Riff)"	3:11
14.	"Freestyler (Skillsters Remix)"	3:03
15.	"Rocking, Just to Make Ya Move (DJ Gismo's Hot Stuff)"	4:36
16.	"B-Boys & Flygirls (Motor Funk Remix)"	3:45
17.	"Uprocking Beats (Radio Edit)"	3:41
Total length:		70:33

== Personnel ==
- B.O.W. – vocals, arrangement
- Kärtsy Hatakka – vocals (track 6)
- Mr. B – vocals (track 8)
- Rummy Nanji – vocals (track 8)
- J.A.K. – vocals (track 9)
- DJ Gismo – turntables, arrangement
- JS16 – production

== Release history ==
Region	Date	Label
Finland	1999	Sony Music Entertainment Finland/Epidrome
Worldwide	14 August 2000	Sony Music Entertainment
Germany	2000	Dance Division

== Charts ==
=== Weekly charts ===
Chart (1999–2000)	Peak position
Australian Albums (ARIA)	24
Australian Dance Albums (ARIA)	8
Austrian Albums (Ö3 Austria)	11
Belgian Albums (Ultratop Flanders)	11
Belgian Albums (Ultratop Wallonia)	21
Dutch Albums (Album Top 100)	35
Finnish Albums (Suomen virallinen lista)	1
French Albums (SNEP)	73
German Albums (Offizielle Top 100)	13
Hungarian Albums (MAHASZ)	7
Italian Albums (FIMI)	27
New Zealand Albums (RMNZ)	13
Norwegian Albums (VG-lista)	2
Scottish Albums (Official Charts)	43
Swedish Albums (Sverigetopplistan)	6
Swiss Albums (Schweizer Hitparade)	12
UK Albums (Official Charts)	33

=== Year-end charts ===
Chart (2000)	Position
Australian Albums (ARIA)	90
Belgian Albums (Ultratop Flanders)	70

== Certifications and sales ==
Region	Certification	Certified units/sales
Australia (ARIA)	Gold	35,000^{^}
Denmark	—	26,175
Finland (Musiikkituottajat)	2× Platinum	134,610
Norway (IFPI Norway)	Gold	25,000^{*}
Poland (ZPAV)	Gold	50,000^{*}
Russia	—	100,000
Sweden (GLF)	Gold	40,000^{^}
^{*} Sales figures based on certification alone.^{^} Shipments figures based on certification alone.

== See also ==
- List of best-selling albums in Finland
