= Freestyler =

1999 single by Bomfunk MC's

Single by Bomfunk MC's

from the album In Stereo
- Released: 30 October 1999
- Genre: Breakbeat
- Length: 5:06
- Label: Epidrome
- Songwriters: Raymond Ebanks; Jaakko Salovaara
- Producer: JS16

Bomfunk MC's singles chronology
"B-Boys & Flygirls" (1999)	"Freestyler" (1999)	"Other Emcee's" (2000)

Audio sample
- file; help

Music videos
- "Freestyler" on YouTube; "Freestyler" (2019 version) on YouTube

"Freestyler" is a song by Finnish hip hop group Bomfunk MC's. It was released in Finland on 30 October 1999 as the third single from their debut studio album, In Stereo (1999), and was released internationally in February 2000. "Freestyler" peaked at number four on the Finnish Singles Chart and topped the charts in more than 10 countries, including Australia, Germany, Italy, New Zealand and Sweden. The song also peaked within the top 10 of the charts in Denmark, Iceland, Ireland, and the United Kingdom.

== Composition ==
"Freestyler" is primarily a breakbeat song, with strong influences of UK dance culture and electronic dance music, as well as some influences from drum and bass and hip hop. It is written in the key of E minor and composed in a tempo of 164 beats per minute.

== Critical reception ==
Daily Record described "Freestyler" as a "cracking old-skool track". CMJ New Music Monthly described the track as "a housed-up hip-hoppity mélange of sampled slide-guitar, rubbery synth bass and Caribbean-inflected dance instructions; a dancefloor natural."

== Music video ==
The music video for the song was mainly filmed at the Hakaniemi metro station, an underground station on the Helsinki Metro line in Finland with platforms 21 metres (69 ft) below sea level, as well as in the nearby Merihaka neighborhood. The principal "home boy" featured in the video is Marlo Snellman, a Finnish model and musician, who later released his own single titled "Dust" and went on to work as producer for his own projects such as "Hipsters" and "Okta". The actor was 15 years old at the time of shooting and got the part through his mother, Finnish modelling magnate Laila Snellman. Marlo has a restaurant in Paris named Recoin.

The video begins with a young man dancing extravagantly during the instrumental intro of the song. Marlo's character is waiting for a train while listening to "Freestyler" on his MiniDisc (Sony Walkman MZ-R55) recorder. When he enters the train, he walks down the aisle past Ismo Lappalainen. He finds a seat across from Raymond Ebanks (B.O. Dubb), the lead singer of the Bomfunk MC's; seated behind Ebanks is Dan Ahti Tolppanen, alias Uniikki. Ebanks imbues Marlo's Sony MiniDisc remote controller with the ability to pause, rewind, or fast-forward individuals. When Marlo realises that he has this ability, he spends the duration of the video manipulating passersby, dancers, escalators, and even the train, with Raymond appearing in the background wherever he goes, watching Marlo. As Marlo comes across the Bomfunk MC's, he tries to manipulate them to no effect. When Raymond approaches Marlo, Marlo accidentally rewinds himself, and the whole video rewinds to the beginning. The music video is a play on themes of empowerment, with the power of the music being transferred to and in the end taken from Marlo by Ebanks. There is a continuity error in the video with the number on the train carriage changing throughout the sequence.

During the video, Marlo comes across the main character from the music video of "Uprocking Beats," another song from In Stereo, and freezes him. Marlo also appears briefly in the music video of "B-Boys & Flygirls", reversing and forwarding the car the main characters are driving.

In 2024, Jaakko Salovaara went back to the same platform at the metro station, where the video was made; there he was filmed by Yle.fi, while telling about how he made the video.

=== 2019 music video ===
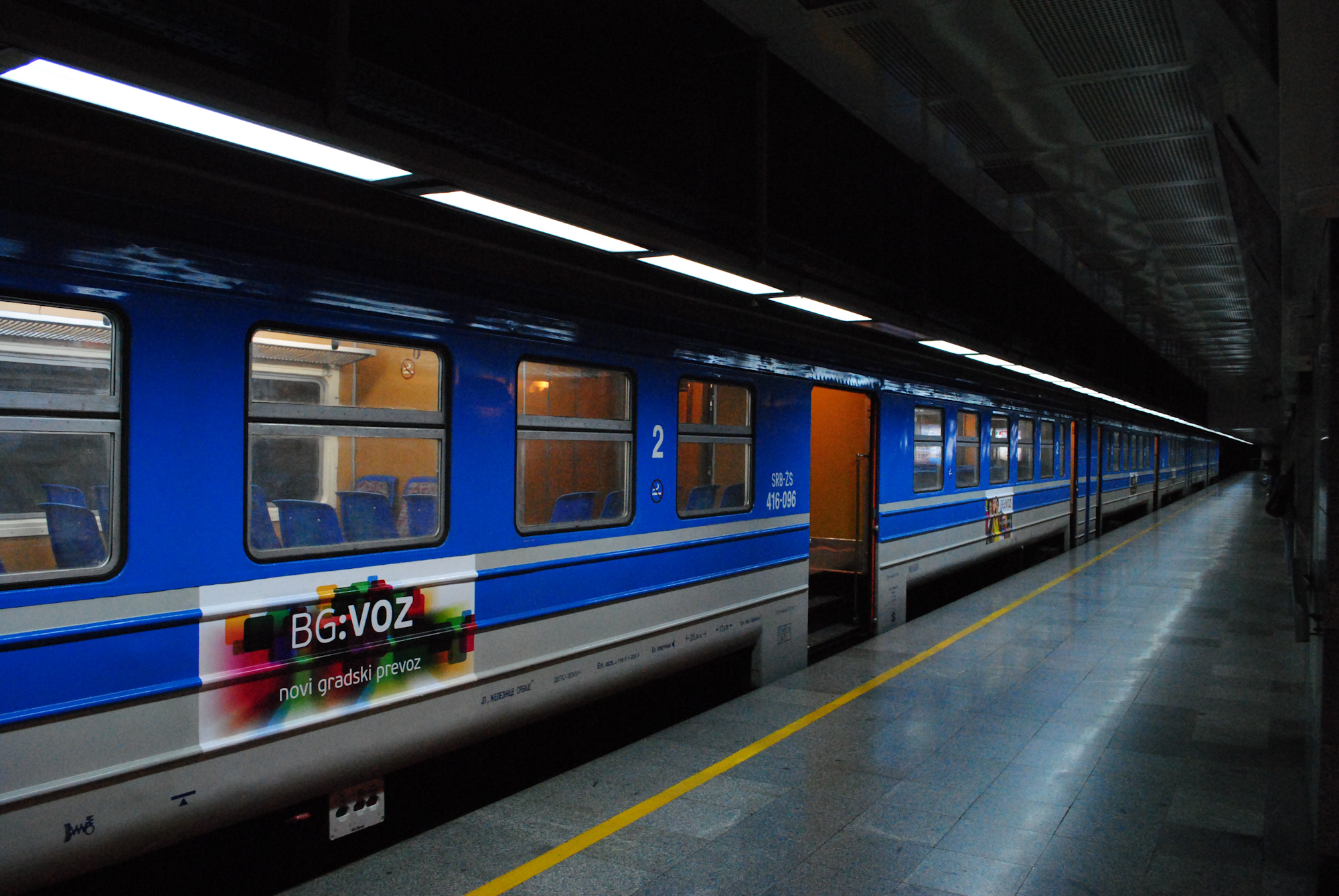
Belgrade passenger carriage 416-096 featured in the 2019 video

For the twentieth anniversary in 2019, a new music video was produced featuring the original band members, with updates to reflect developments in technology and culture. The central figure is now a girl (played by Milica Bajčetić) with a mobile phone, with various Belgian YouTuber cameo appearances.

The 2019 music video was filmed at Vukov Spomenik railway station, an underground station on the BG Voz commuter railway network serving Belgrade, Serbia. The new video was sponsored by communications provider Telenet (Belgium) to promote a new mobile phone service.

== Legacy ==
The music video was parodied by Funky Bong in Assembler (k)—an entry for the Assembly 2000 wild demo competition; it placed fifth in the contest. The music video was later parodied by the hip hop group Raptori for their song "Hiphopmusiikkia". In 2011, the beginning scene was remade in the music video of DJ RZY's "Tervetuloo Helsinkiin". In 2019, the beginning scene was also tributed in a hardcore techno fashion in the music video "Luonnon Nostatus" by Teknoaidi & Iconobreaker featuring Samu Kuusisto.

In 2026 the song was included in the short program performance of Russian figure skater Vladimir Samoilov at the Milano Cortina Olympics.

== Track listings ==
Finnish 12-inch single and Australian maxi-CD single

1. "Freestyler" (radio edit) – 2:52
2. "Freestyler" (alternative radio edit) – 4:07
3. "Freestyler" (Happy Mickey Mouse mix) – 4:47
4. "Freestyler" (Missing Link remix) – 5:40

European CD single

1. "Freestyler" (radio edit) – 2:52
2. "Freestyler" (album version) – 5:06

European maxi-CD single

1. "Freestyler" (radio edit) – 4:07
2. "Freestyler" (Skillsters remix) – 3:03
3. "Freestyler" (Happy Mickey Mouse mix) – 4:48
4. "Freestyler" (Missing Link remix) – 5:40
5. "Freestyler" (album version) – 5:06

UK CD1

1. "Freestyler" (radio edit) – 2:52
2. "Freestyler" (alternative radio edit) – 4:07
3. "Freestyler" (Dirty Rotten Scoundrels Surgical Spirit dub) – 7:59

UK CD2

1. "Freestyler" (radio edit) – 2:52
2. "Freestyler" (Dirty Rotten Scoundrels Surgical Spirit mix) – 8:04
3. "Freestyler" (Tuff Twins mix) – 7:13

UK cassette single

1. "Freestyler" (radio edit) – 2:52
2. "Freestyler" (alternative radio edit) – 4:07

Australian CD single

1. "Freestyler" (radio edit) – 2:52
2. "Freestyler" (Tuff Twins mix) – 7:13
3. "Freestyler" (Dirty Rotten Scoundrels Surgical Spirit mix) – 8:04
4. "Freestyler" (Skillsters remix) – 3:03
5. "Freestyler" (alternative radio edit) – 4:07

US maxi-CD single

1. "Freestyler" (radio edit) – 2:52
2. "Freestyler" (Missing Link mix) – 5:39
3. "Freestyler" (Happy Mickey Acid Break mix) – 4:47
4. "Freestyler" (Skillsters mix) – 3:03
5. "Sky's the Limit" (radio edit) – 3:58
6. "Freestyler" (album version) – 5:06

US 12-inch single

A1. "Freestyler" (Missing Link remix) – 5:40
A2. "Freestyler" (radio edit) – 4:07
B1. "Freestyler" (Happy Mickey Acid Break mix) – 4:48
B2. "Freestyler" (Skillsters remix) – 3:03

== Charts ==
=== Original version ===
==== Weekly charts ====
Weekly chart performance for "Freestyler"
Chart (2000–2001)	Peak position
Australia (ARIA)	1
Austria (Ö3 Austria Top 40)	1
Belgium (Ultratop 50 Flanders)	1
Belgium (Ultratop 50 Wallonia)	1
Denmark (IFPI)	2
Europe (Eurochart Hot 100)	1
Finland (Suomen virallinen lista)	4
France (SNEP)	8
Germany (GfK)	1
Greece International (IFPI)	1
Hungary (Mahasz)	6
Iceland (Íslenski Listinn Topp 40)	2
Ireland (IRMA)	3
Ireland Dance (IRMA)	2
Italy (FIMI)	1
Netherlands (Dutch Top 40)	1
Netherlands (Single Top 100)	1
New Zealand (Recorded Music NZ)	1
Norway (VG-lista)	1
Poland Airplay (Music & Media)	12
Portugal (AFP)	6
Romania (Romanian Top 100)	1
Scottish Singles Sales (Official Charts)	4
Spain (Promusicae)	7
Sweden (Sverigetopplistan)	1
Switzerland (Schweizer Hitparade)	1
UK Singles (Official Charts)	2
US Maxi-Singles Sales (Billboard)	46

==== Year-end charts ====
Year-end chart performance for "Freestyler"
Chart (2000)	Position
Australia (ARIA)	3
Austria (Ö3 Austria Top 40)	4
Belgium (Ultratop 50 Flanders)	3
Belgium (Ultratop 50 Wallonia)	7
Denmark (IFPI)	4
Europe (Eurochart Hot 100)	1
Europe Border Breakers (Music & Media)	4
France (SNEP)	24
Germany (Media Control)	4
Iceland (Íslenski Listinn Topp 40)	1
Ireland (IRMA)	30
Italy (Musica e dischi)	2
Netherlands (Dutch Top 40)	5
Netherlands (Single Top 100)	3
New Zealand (RIANZ)	29
Romania (Romanian Top 100)	1
Sweden (Hitlistan)	2
Switzerland (Schweizer Hitparade)	1
UK Singles (OCC)	23

==== Decade-end charts ====
Decade-end chart performance for "Freestyler"
Chart (2000–2009)	Position
Australia (ARIA)	56
Austria (Ö3 Austria Top 40)	21
Germany (Media Control GfK)	31
Netherlands (Single Top 100)	10

=== "Freestyler (Rock the Microphone)" ===
==== Weekly charts ====
Weekly chart performance for "Freestyler (Rock the Microphone)"
Chart (2024)	Peak position
Estonia Airplay (TopHit)	30
Latvia Airplay (TopHit)	6
Lithuania Airplay (TopHit)	16

==== Monthly charts ====
Monthly chart performance for "Freestyler (Rock the Microphone)"
Chart (2024)	Peak Position
Estonia Airplay (TopHit)	50
Latvia Airplay (TopHit)	13
Lithuania Airplay (TopHit)	22

== Certifications and sales ==
Certifications and sales for "Freestyler"
Region	Certification	Certified units/sales
Australia (ARIA)	2× Platinum	140,000^{^}
Austria (IFPI Austria)	Platinum	50,000^{*}
Belgium (BRMA)	2× Platinum	100,000^{*}
Denmark (IFPI Danmark)	Gold	45,000^{‡}
France (SNEP)	Gold	250,000^{*}
Germany (BVMI)	3× Gold	750,000^{^}
Italy	—	100,000
Netherlands (NVPI)	Platinum	75,000^{^}
New Zealand (RMNZ)	Platinum	10,000^{*}
Norway (IFPI Norway)	Platinum	
Sweden (GLF)	3× Platinum	90,000^{^}
Switzerland (IFPI Switzerland)	Platinum	50,000^{^}
United Kingdom (BPI)	Platinum	600,000^{‡}
Summaries
Europe	—	1,500,000
^{*} Sales figures based on certification alone.^{^} Shipments figures based on certification alone.^{‡} Sales+streaming figures based on certification alone.

== Release history ==
Release dates and formats for "Freestyler"
Region	Date	Format(s)	Label(s)	Ref.
Finland	30 October 1999	12-inch vinyl; CD	Epidrome	
Europe	14 February 2000	CD	Epidrome	
United Kingdom	24 July 2000	CD; cassette	Dance Pool	
United States	12 December 2000	Alternative radio	Epic	
