= Bomfunk MC's =

Finnish hip hop group

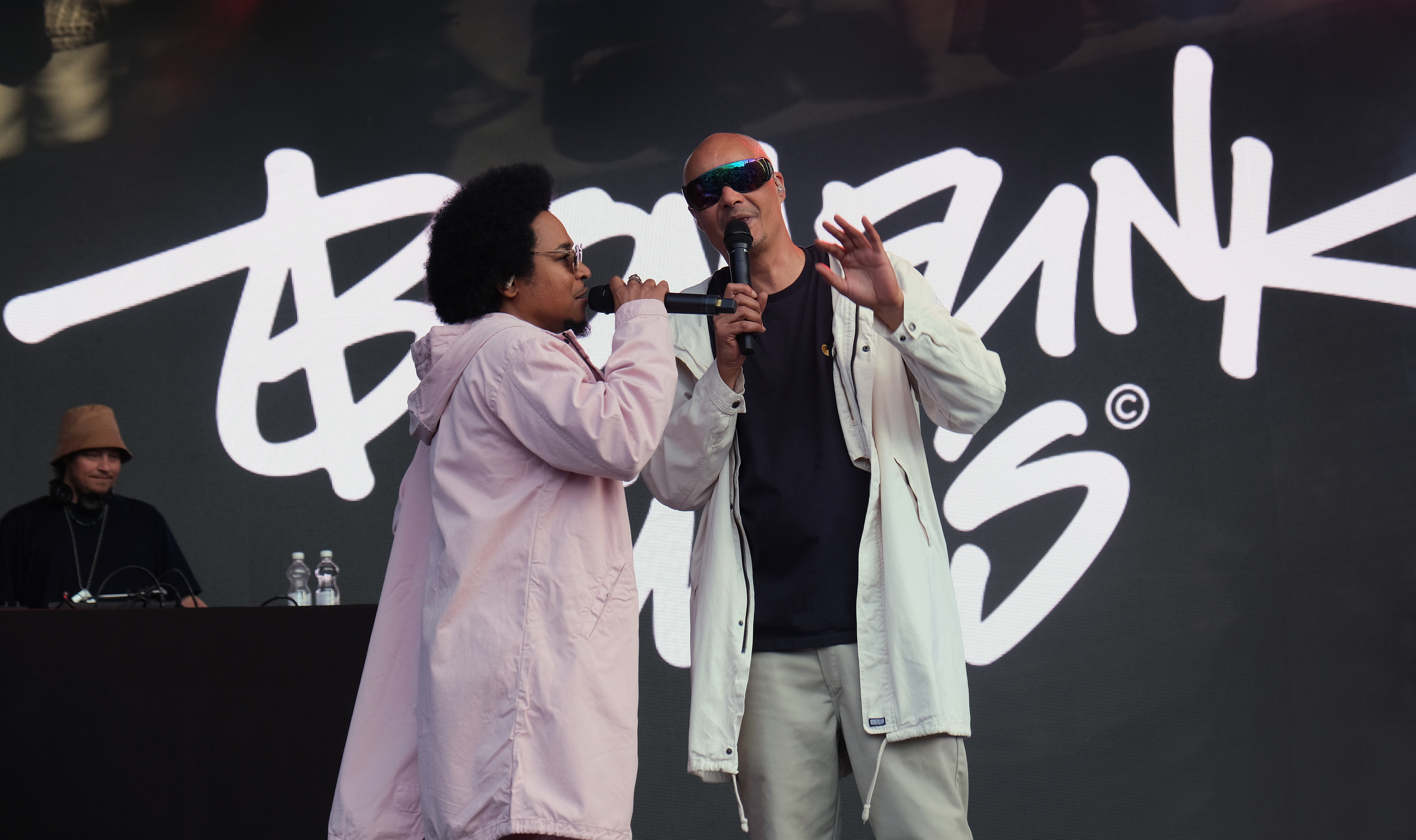
- Bomfunk MC's performing in 2022.

Background information
- Origin: Finland
- Genres: Hip hop; techno; breakbeat; electro; drum and bass
- Years active: 1998–2005; 2019–present
- Members: Raymond Ebanks (B.O. Dubb); Jaakko Salovaara (JS16); Ari Toikka (A.T.); Ville Mäkinen (Mr Wily); Riku Pentti (DJ Infekto); Okke Komulainen; Ismo Lappalainen (DJ Gismo)

Bomfunk MC's is a Finnish hip hop group that was active from 1998 to 2005, before reuniting in 2018. The group's frontman is rapper B.O. Dubb (born Raymond Ebanks, formerly known as B.O.W.), and the main producer is Jaakko Salovaara, also known as JS16.

== Career ==
=== 1999–2005 ===
The band's debut release was the 1999 album In Stereo (Sony Music), which included the singles "Freestyler", "Uprocking Beats", and "B-Boys & Flygirls", all of which gained popularity in the United Kingdom. "Uprocking Beats" reached the number one position on the Finnish Dance charts. In Stereo sold over 600,000 units.

The album's success led to the release of "Freestyler" in Scandinavia and Germany. By 2000, "Freestyler" had become popular across Europe, becoming the region's highest-selling single of the year. The single also reached the number one position in Australia, New Zealand, Denmark, Norway, Sweden, the Netherlands, Italy, and Germany, and peaked at number two in the United Kingdom. The Bomfunk MC's won the 2000 Best Nordic Act award at the MTV Europe Music Awards.

In 2002, the group released their second album, Burnin' Sneakers, which included the singles "Super Electric", "Live Your Life" featuring Max'C, and "(Crack It!) Something Goin' On" with Jessica Folcker. While this album received less international attention, it sold well in Finland. "Something Goin' On" reached the top 10 in Germany.

In September 2002, DJ Gismo left the band (later joining the band Stonedeep) and was promptly replaced by Riku Pentti (DJ) and Okke Komulainen (keyboards). After their addition, Bomfunk MC's released a special remix of "Back to Back".

In 2004, the group released their third and final album, Reverse Psychology, under Universal Music. This was preceded by the single "No Way in Hell". Later that year, they released another single, "Hypnotic", featuring Elena Mady. Half of the album was produced by JS16, while the other half was produced by Pentti, Komulainen, and Ville Mäkinen, collectively known as The Skillsters Plus One.

Reverse Psychology and its singles received limited attention outside the Nordic countries. Both singles reached the German top 100 but failed to chart elsewhere in Western Europe. Fan reception was mixed, as many fans continued to see DJ Gismo as a key figure in the band, despite his minimal involvement in the band's music production, apart from providing scratches. Remixes attributed to DJ Gismo were actually produced by JS16, the band's main producer.

In 2006, Bomfunk MC's toured New Zealand during university orientation, performing in Dunedin, Christchurch, Wellington, Hamilton, and Auckland in support of their album Reverse Psychology.

=== 2019–present ===
Many of the band's collaborators pursued other musical projects, activities, or faded into obscurity. The band's main producer and mentor, JS16, remained musically active as a solo artist; in 2007, he released his first solo track in over five years, "Rosegarden," which gained significant club play. He is also a successful remixer and forms half of the popular dance act Dallas Superstars.

In the summer of 2019, the band made a comeback with their classic lineup. They performed at several festivals, debuting two new tracks, "Can't Runaway" and "Mic Drop." B.O. Dubb and DJ Gismo participated, along with their producer JS16, who officially became a member of the group.

In February 2019, the video for "Freestyler" was reshot as a tribute to the 20th anniversary of its release. The new version features the original band members and re-enacts scenes from the original, but with a modern twist. This includes replacing the Sony mini-disc player that controlled the music with a smartphone, changing the main character from male to female, and incorporating modern dance styles. The video was shot in Belgrade, Serbia.

== Members ==
Current members

- Raymond Ebanks (a.k.a. B.O.W. or B.O. Dubb) – MC (1998–2005, 2019–present)
- Ismo Lappalainen (a.k.a. DJ Gismo) – DJ (1998–2002, 2019–present)
- Jaakko Salovaara (a.k.a. JS16) – producer (1998–2005, 2019–present)

Former members

- Ville Mäkinen (a.k.a. Mr Wily) – bass, keyboards, backing vocals (1998–2005)
- Riku Pentti (a.k.a. DJ Infekto) – DJ (2002–2005)
- Okke Komulainen – keyboards (2002–2005)
- Ari Toikka (a.k.a. A.T.) – drums (1998–2005)

== Discography ==
=== Albums ===
List of albums, with selected chart positions, sales figures and certifications
Title	Album details	Peak chart positions										Certifications
Title	Album details	FIN	AUS	AUT	GER	NLD	NOR	NZ	SWE	SWI	UK	Certifications
In Stereo	Released: 2 June 1999; Label: Epidrome, Sony Music Finland; Format: CD, cassette, digital download	1	24	11	13	35	2	13	6	12	33	IFPI FIN: 2× Platinum; ARIA: Gold; IFPI NOR: Gold; IFPI SWE: Gold; RMNZ: Gold
Burnin' Sneakers	Released: 6 May 2002; Label: Epidrome, Sony Music Finland; Format: CD, cassette, digital download	1	—	—	—	—	26	—	24	—	—	IFPI FIN: Platinum
Reverse Psychology	Released: 20 September 2004; Label: Epidrome, Sony Music Finland; Format: CD, cassette, digital download	10	—	—	—	—	—	—	—	—	—	
"—" denotes a recording that did not chart or was not released in that territory.

=== Singles ===
List of singles, with selected chart positions and certifications, showing year released and album name
Title	Year	Peak chart positions										Certifications	Album
Title	Year	FIN	AUS	AUT	BEL	GER	NLD	NOR	SWE	SWI	UK	Certifications	Album
"Uprocking Beats"	1999	—	43	67	57	63	—	—	53	—	11		In Stereo
"B-Boys & Flygirls"	1999	5	7	14	4	18	14	—	3	20	—	ARIA: Platinum; IFPI SWE: Gold	In Stereo
"Freestyler"	1999	4	1	1	1	1	1	1	1	1	2	ARIA: 2× Platinum; BPI: Gold; BVMI: 3× Gold; IFPI AUT: Platinum; IFPI NOR: Platinum; IFPI SWE: 3× Platinum; IFPI SWI: Platinum	In Stereo
"Other Emcee's"	2000	5	—	—	—	—	—	—	—	—	—		In Stereo
"Super Electric"	2001	1	39	58	—	58	75	13	29	59	—	IFPI FIN: Platinum	Burnin' Sneakers
"Live Your Life" (featuring Max'C)	2002	1	—	—	37	67	—	4	6	—	—		Burnin' Sneakers
"(Crack It!) Something Goin' On" (featuring Jessica Folcker)	2002	3	—	19	31	10	—	2	4	70	—	IFPI NOR: Gold	Burnin' Sneakers
"Back to Back" (featuring Z-MC)	2002	12	—	—	—	—	—	—	—	—	—		Burnin' Sneakers
"No Way in Hell"	2004	8	—	—	—	85	—	—	—	—	—		Reverse Psychology
"Hypnotic" (featuring Elena Mady)	2004	1	—	—	—	68	—	—	—	—	—		Reverse Psychology
"Turn It Up" (featuring Anna Nordell)	2004	—	—	—	—	—	—	—	—	—	—		Reverse Psychology
"—" denotes a recording that did not chart or was not released in that territory.

=== Music videos ===
- "Uprocking Beats" (1999)
- "B-Boys & Flygirls" (1999)
- "Freestyler" (1999)
- "B-Boys & Flygirls Y2K Mix" (2000)
- "Uprocking Beats JS 16 Radio Mix" (2000)
- "Super Electric" (2001)
- "Live Your Life" (2002)
- "(Crack It!) Something Goin' On" (2002)
- "Back to Back" (2002)
- "No Way in Hell" (2004)
- "Hypnotic" (2005)
- "Freestyler" (2019)

== See also ==
- List of best-selling music artists in Finland
- Finnish hip hop
