= Tell Me What You Like =

Single by Jessica Folcker

from the album Jessica
- B-side: "Remix"
- Released: 1998
- Studio: Cheiron Studios
- Genre: Pop
- Length: 3:34
- Label: Jive
- Songwriters: Denniz Pop; Herbie Crichlow; Max Martin
- Producers: Denniz Pop; Kristian Lundin; Max Martin

Jessica Folcker singles chronology
"Tell Me What You Like" (1998)	"How Will I Know (Who You Are)" (1998)

Music video
- "Tell Me What You Like" on YouTube

"Tell Me What You Like" is the debut single by Swedish singer Jessica Folcker, released in 1998 by Jive Records from her debut studio album, Jessica (1998). It was produced by Denniz Pop, Kristian Lundin and Max Martin, and Pop and Martin co-wrote it with British music producer and songwriter Herbie Crichlow. It became a hit in Europe, peaking at number ten in Sweden, number 13 in France, number 16 in Norway and number 20 in Denmark.

== Track listing ==
CD single, Europe
No.	Title	Length
1.	"Tell Me What You Like" (Radio Edit)	3:34
2.	"Tell Me What You Like" (Night Mix Edit)	3:57

CD maxi, Europe
No.	Title	Length
1.	"Tell Me What You Like" (Radio Edit)	3:34
2.	"Tell Me What You Like" (Night Mix Edit)	3:57
3.	"Tell Me What You Like" (Night Mix Extended)	7:38
4.	"Private Eye" (Album Version)	4:37

== Charts ==
=== Weekly charts ===
Chart (1998)	Peak position
Denmark (IFPI)	20
France (SNEP)	13
Germany (GfK)	97
Netherlands (Dutch Top 40 Tipparade)	13
Netherlands (Single Top 100)	61
Norway (VG-lista)	16
Sweden (Sverigetopplistan)	10

=== Year-end charts ===
Chart (1998)	Position
Sweden (Hitlistan)	52

Chart (1999)	Position
France (SNEP)	80

== Certifications ==
Region	Certification	Certified units/sales
France (SNEP)	Silver	125,000^{*}
Sweden (GLF)	Gold	15,000^{^}
^{*} Sales figures based on certification alone.^{^} Shipments figures based on certification alone.
