= Burnin' Sneakers =

Studio album by Bomfunk MC's
- Released: April 1, 2002
- Recorded: JS16 Studios in Finland
- Label: Sony Music
- Producer: JS16

Bomfunk MC's chronology
In Stereo (1999)	Burnin' Sneakers (2002)	Reverse Psychology (2004)

Singles from Burnin' Sneakers
- 1. "Live Your Life" Released: 2002

Burnin' Sneakers is the second studio album by Bomfunk MC's, released in April 1, 2002 through Sony Music Entertainment.

== Track listing ==
No.	Title	Length
1.	"Super Electric"	3:52
2.	"Put Ya Hands Up"	3:42
3.	"Where's the Party At"	4:03
4.	"Back to Back"	4:09
5.	"Rockin' with the Best"	4:08
6.	"Freak It On"	3:45
7.	"Throw 1 Back at Cha"	3:55
8.	"Live Your Life"	3:49
9.	"Kingstep"	3:29
10.	"Something Goin' On"	3:00
11.	"We R Atomic"	4:03
12.	"Steady Rockin'"	3:54

== Personnel ==
=== Bomfunk MC's ===
- Raymond Ebanks (a.k.a. B.O.W. or B.O. Dubb) - vocals
- Ismo Lappalainen (a.k.a. DJ Gismo) - DJ, turntables, samples, keyboards, producer
- Ville Mäkinen (a.k.a. Mr Wily) - bass, keyboards
- Ari Toikka (a.k.a. A.T.) - drums, percussion

=== Additional musicians ===
- Jaakko Salovaara (a.k.a. JS16) - producer
- Max'C - vocals (on Live Your Life)
- Jessica Folcker - vocals (on Something Going On)
- Mr B - vocals (on Where’s the Party At)
