= Neon City Rockers =

Studio album by Jann Wilde & The Neon Comets
- Released: 27 August 2008
- Studio: NoteNet Studios Tampere
- Genre: Glam Rock, Post-punk revival
- Label: Hype Records
- Producer: Mefisto Miettinen

Jann Wilde & The Neon Comets chronology
Tokio Okei (2007)	Neon City Rockers (2008)	Don`t Play With The Flame On Your Hand (2010)

Neon City Rockers is the second studio album by Finnish glam rock singer Jann Wilde. Released on 27 August 2008 it the only Jann Wilde album under the band name Jann Wilde & The Neon Comets. The album draws influences from rock music dating from the 1950s to 1970s.

== Reception ==
Reviews were generally very good. At soundi-fi reviewer Tero Alanko found the album to be "fresh and catchy" although clearly with influences from Suede and David Bowie. The album was awarded 4 stars, although negative attention was drawn to the poor quality of the artwork. At Terrorverlag the album was awarded 9 out of 10.

== Track listing ==
All lyrics are written by Jann Wilde; all music is composed by Jann Wilde.

No.	Title	Length
1.	"Baby Said Yeah"	2:45
2.	"Danceroom Bop"	3:04
3.	"Screams at the Ballet"	2:51
4.	"Neon City Rockers"	2:51
5.	"Deimos & Phobos"	3:07
6.	"Superstar Cocktail Bar"	2:08
7.	"The Ballad Of Jane Glaze"	2:32
8.	"Glamtronik"	2:38
9.	"Forever"	3:38
10.	"She's A Killer"	3:12
11.	"Saturday Love"	3:20
12.	"The Motion Picture"	4:45

== Personnel ==
- Dean Martini – Bass, Synth (tracks: 1, 4, and 12)
- Tender Rexx – Drums (tracks: 1 to 3, 5 to 12), Percussion (tracks 1, 4 and 5).
- Robin Savage – Guitar
- Kaide Palmer – Keyboards, vocals
- Jann Wilde – Vocals

=== Guest musicians ===
- Mirja Mattinen – Cello (tracks: 10, 12)
- Timo Lampila – Saxophone (tracks: 7)
- Antti Volter – Synth (tracks: 8)
- Jenni-Sofia Peippo – Violin (tracks: 10 and 12)
- Poppy Starley – Vocals (tracks 1 and 9)

=== Production ===
- Jann Wilde & The Comets – Arranged By
- Svante Forsback – Mastered By
- Mauri Pennanen – Photography By [Band]
- Katri Kallio, Venla Muikku – Photography By [Live]
- Mefisto Miettinen – Producer
