= How Will I Know (Who You Are) =

Single by Jessica Folcker

from the album Jessica
- B-side: "How Will I Know (Who You Are)" (instrumental) "Anywhere Is Paradise"
- Released: 1998
- Studio: Cheiron Studios
- Genre: Pop
- Length: 3:38
- Label: Jive; Zomba
- Songwriters: Andreas Carlsson; Kristian Lundin; Max Martin
- Producer: Kristian Lundin

Jessica Folcker singles chronology
"Tell Me What You Like" (1998)	"How Will I Know (Who You Are)" (1998)	"I Do" (1999)

Music video
- "How Will I Know (Who You Are)" on YouTube

"How Will I Know (Who You Are)" is a song recorded by Swedish singer Jessica Folcker, released in 1998 by Jive and Zomba Records as the second single from Folcker's first studio album, Jessica (1998). The song is written by Andreas Carlsson, Kristian Lundin and Max Martin, and produced by Lundin. Carlsson also provided backing vocals. Lyrically the song describes the hard feelings of letting go of a relationship and saying goodbye. It became an international hit and went platinum in Sweden, after reaching number seven on Sverigetopplistan. Additionally, "How Will I Know (Who You Are)" was a top-10 hit also in Austria and the Netherlands, and a top-20 hit in Belgium, Denmark, Norway and Switzerland. On the Eurochart Hot 100, the song peaked at number 33 in April 1999.

== Track listing ==
- CD single, Europe
1. "How Will I Know (Who You Are)" — 3:38
2. "How Will I Know (Who You Are)" (instrumental) — 3:36
- CD maxi, UK
1. "How Will I Know (Who You Are)" — 3:38
2. "How Will I Know (Who You Are)" (instrumental) — 3:38
3. "Anywhere Is Paradise — 5:16
- CD maxi, Europe
1. "How Will I Know (Who You Are)" — 3:38
2. "How Will I Know (Who You Are)" (Evolution remix edit) — 7:16
3. "How Will I Know (Who You Are)" (Basement mix edit) — 3:24
4. "How Will I Know (Who You Are)" (Nature's Destiny mix) — 7:10
5. "How Will I Know (Who You Are)" (instrumental) — 3:38

== Charts ==
=== Weekly charts ===
Chart (1998–1999)	Peak position
Austria (Ö3 Austria Top 40)	4
Belgium (Ultratop 50 Flanders)	13
Denmark (IFPI)	11
Europe (Eurochart Hot 100)	33
France (SNEP)	62
Germany (GfK)	24
Iceland (Íslenski Listinn Topp 40)	28
Latvia (Latvijas Top 50)	9
Netherlands (Dutch Top 40)	7
Netherlands (Single Top 100)	6
Norway (VG-lista)	20
Scotland (OCC)	65
Sweden (Sverigetopplistan)	7
Switzerland (Schweizer Hitparade)	17
UK Singles (OCC)	47
UK Independent Singles (OCC)	7

=== Year-end charts ===
Chart (1998)	Position
Sweden (Hitlistan)	64

Chart (1999)	Position
Austria (Ö3 Austria Top 40)	37
Belgium (Ultratop 50 Flanders)	57
Latvia (Latvijas Top 50)	114
Netherlands (Dutch Top 40)	25
Netherlands (Single Top 100)	41
Romania (Romanian Top 100)	68
Sweden (Hitlistan)	73
