= Reloaded (DJ BoBo album) =

Compilation album by DJ BoBo
- Released: September 20, 2013
- Genre: Electronic
- Label: Yes Music

DJ BoBo chronology
Dancing Las Vegas (2011)	Reloaded (2013)	Circus (2014)

Reloaded is a 2013 compilation album by Swiss singer, songwriter, dancer, and music producer DJ BoBo containing reworked materials of some of his greatest hits.

Six of the 14 tracks on the album are remixed by King & White Mix, another by Swiss DJ and producer David May and one by DJ / producer German duo Bodybangers (Andreas Hinz und Michael Müller).

The album also has collaborations as well with many established artists including Remady, Manu-L, The Baseballs, Mike Candys, Kim Wilde, Inna and Jessica Folcker, and a final track comprising a megamix of many of his other hits.

== Track listing ==
Track #	Title	Credits	Length
1.	"Somebody Dance With Me (Remady 2013 Mix)"	DJ Bobo feat. Manu-L	3:01
2.	"Pray"	King & White Mix	3:51
3.	"Take Control"	DJ Bobo & Mike Candys	3:20
4.	"Everybody"	DJ Bobo & Inna	3:20
5.	"Love Is All Around"	David May Mix	3:22
6.	"I Believe"	DJ Bobo & Kim Wilde	3:33
7.	"There Is A Party"	King & White Mix	2:59
8.	"Chihuahua"	DJ Bobo & The Baseballs	3:12
9.	"Freedom"	King & White Mix	3:32
10.	"Shadows of The Night"	King & White Mix	3:12
11.	"What A Feeling"	Bodybangers Mix	3:39
12.	"Respect Yourself"	DJ Bobo & Jessica Folcker	2:59
13.	"Let The Dream Come True"	King & White Mix	3:24
14.	"Reloaded Megamix"		6:10

== Charts ==
Chart (2010)	Peak position
Swiss Albums Chart	6
German Albums Chart	53
