= Jann Wilde =

- Born: April 14, 1982 (age 44); Riihimäki, Finland
- Origin: Riihimäki
- Genres: Indie rock, new wave, alternative rock, post-punk revival, synthpop
- Occupations: Singer, songwriter, guitarist, bassist
- Instruments: vocals, keyboards, guitar, bass, drums, producer
- Years active: 2004–current
- Labels: Yläkulo, The Velvet Beat
- Formerly of: The Saturnettes
- Website: Official Website

Jann Wilde (Jani Matti Juhani Tuovinen) is a Finnish singer/songwriter from Tampere, Finland. He was born on 14 April 1982.

Jann Wilde started his musical career when he released his demo EP Boys Out Of New York in 2004. On the early demos, he recorded all the instruments on most of the tracks. In 2005, Jann Wilde teamed up with a band Rose Avenue and formed Jann Wilde & Rose Avenue.

They released one album in February 2007, called "Tokio Okei", before splitting up.

Subsequently, Jann Wilde and Rose Avenue drummer Tender Rexx recruited new musicians. Their record label wanted them to retain the existing band name, but the new formation took the name Jann Wilde & The Neon Comets. They released the critically acclaimed album Neon City Rockers on August 27, 2008. Soon after the release of the album, the band left their label, Hype Records, citing a lack of financial and artistical support.

Jann Wilde's solo album Don't Play With The Flame On Your Hand was released on May 5, 2010. He is also featured on a new documentary film Helsinki Twilight 1984 as an actor.

He started a group called The Saturnettes in 2011. Their eponymous debut album was released on November 16, 2011. A second album was released on November 1, 2013.

He has been performing under his real name Jani Matti Juhani since 2014.

== Discography ==
=== Albums ===
- Tokio Okei (Jann Wilde & Rose Avenue) (2007)
- Neon City Rockers (Jann Wilde & The Neon Comets) (2008)
- Don’t Play with the Flame on Your Hand (Jann Wilde) (2010)
- The Saturnettes (The Saturnettes) (2011)
- The Saturnettes (The Saturnettes) (2013)

=== EPs ===
- Carlights (Jann Wilde) (2010)

=== Singles ===
- "Boys Out Of New York" (2006)
- "Lover Lover Lover" (2007)
- "Polaroid" (2008 - free download single)
- "Neon City Rockers" (2008 - download single)
- "Deimos & Phobos" (2008 - PROMO)
- "Last Saturday In Gaza / Wendy" (2010 - PROMO)
- "Jekyllene / Song For The Movie" (2010 - Free Download single)
