= Live Your Life (Bomfunk MC's song) =

Single by Bomfunk MC's

from the album Burnin' Sneakers
- Released: 2002
- Recorded: 2002
- Genre: Hip hop
- Length: 3:50
- Label: Sony; Epidrome
- Songwriter(s): JS16
- Producer(s): JS16

Bomfunk MC's singles chronology
"Super Electric" (2001)	"Live Your Life" (2002)	"(Crack It!) Something Goin' On" (2002)

"Live Your Life" is a song by Bomfunk MC's and Max'C. The single was released in 2002 and reached the top ten in the United Kingdom, United States, Germany and Japan. The song has been listed for four weeks on the German Singles Top 100. It entered the chart on position 67 in 2003 and peaked on number 67, where it stayed for one week. The single was accompanied by multiple remixes.

== Charts ==
Chart (2002)	Peak position
Belgium (Ultratop 50 Flanders)	37
Denmark (Tracklisten)	14
Finland (Suomen virallinen lista)	1
Germany (GfK)	67
Norway (VG-lista)	4
Sweden (Sverigetopplistan)	6

== Track listing ==
No.	Title	Length
1.	"Live Your Life (On The Edge Mix)"	3:47
2.	"Live Your Life (Original Version)"	3:49
3.	"Live Your Life (DJ Slow Remix)"	3:54
4.	"Live Your Life (Fu-Tourist Remix)"	7:07
5.	"Live Your Life (Modulation Remix)"	6:23
6.	"Live Your Life (C/L Bounce Remix)"	4:06
7.	"Live Your Life (Extended Mix)"	5:25
8.	"It's All In Your Mind"	5:34
Total length:		40:05
