= Jessica Folcker =

Swedish singer (born 1975)

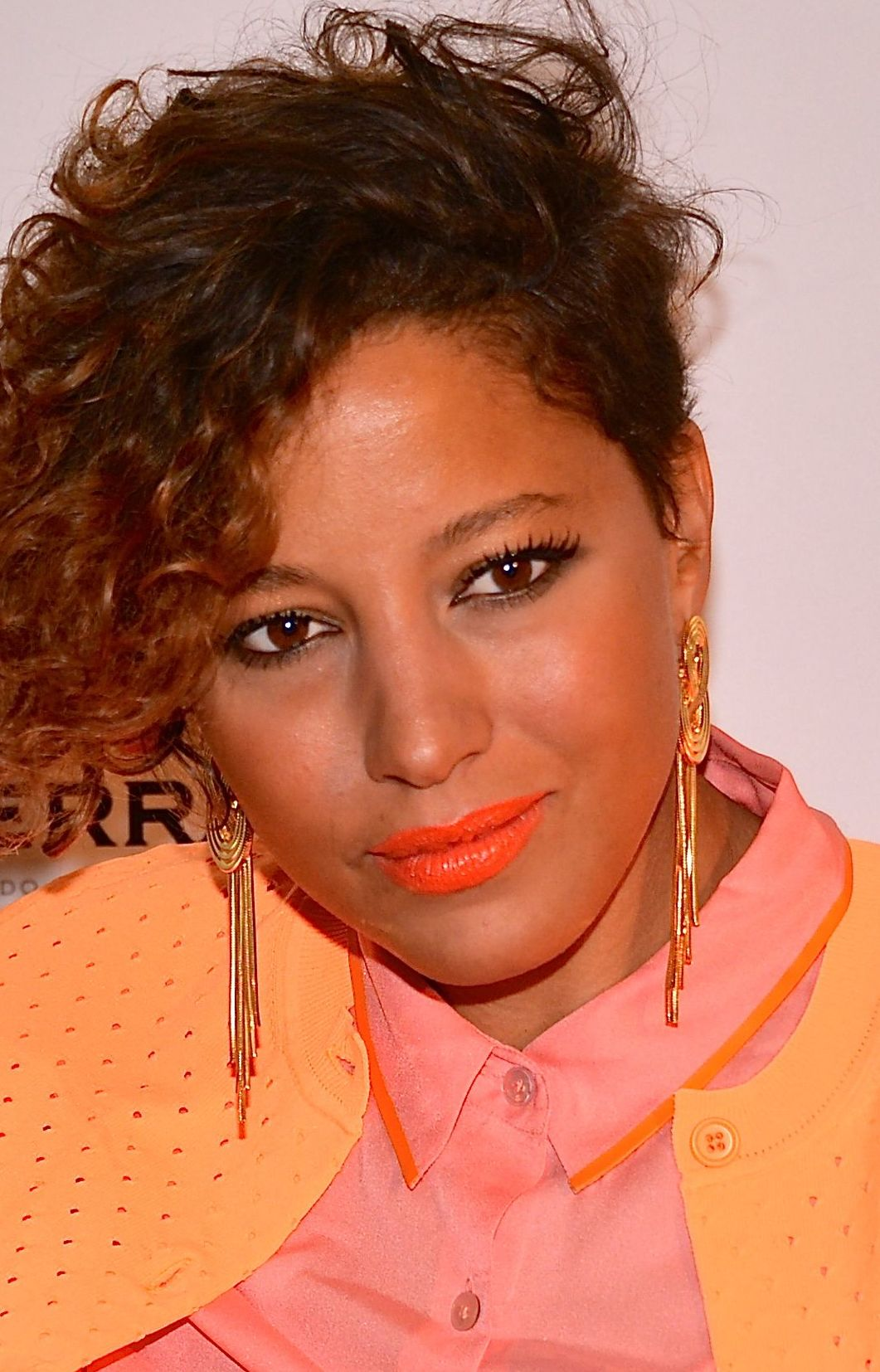
- Folcker in 2013
- Born: Jessica Elisabeth Angelique Folcker; 9 July 1975 (age 51); Täby, Sweden
- Other name: Jessica
- Occupation: Singer
- Years active: 1998–present
- Musical career
- Genres: Pop; dance; R&B; soul
- Instrument: Vocals
- Labels: Jive; Cosmos

Jessica Elisabeth Angelique Folcker (born 9 July 1975), known professionally as Jessica, is a Swedish singer. Her debut album Jessica in 1998 used her mononym, whereas on her follow up album Dino she was credited as Jessica Folker (without the C in her surname). Her following albums På svenska in 2005 and Skin Close in 2007 have used her full name, Jessica Folcker. She is best known for her two international hits "Tell Me What You Like" and "How Will I Know (Who You Are)" both in 1998 and for "(Crack It) Something Going On" that featured her vocals and was a big hit for Bomfunk MC's in 2002.

== Biography ==
Folcker was born as Jessica Elisabeth Angelique Folcker in Täby, Stockholm County, on 9 July 1975. Her mother is Swedish and her father is from Senegal.

Jessica attended Adolf Fredrik's Music School in Stockholm for six years until she was 17. Her big dream of becoming a singer, was fulfilled when she was engaged as a backing singer for Ace of Base and Dr. Alban. She also performed the chorus in Leila K's hit "Electric" and did background vocals for E-Type.

On Jessica's debut album, named simply Jessica and released in autumn 1998, she worked with composer and producer Max Martin, known for having written Britney Spears' Baby One More Time. The album was an instant hit, and Jessica became an international star overnight. As a result, Jessica travelled to Asia for a six-week-long promotional tour across Japan, the Philippines, South Korea, Taiwan, and Thailand, resulting in high sales in the region, including selling gold. In South Korea, her remake of David Foster classic Goodbye was used as the theme ballad for the movie A Promise, and rapidly became the most frequently played song on South Korean radio.

In Sweden, Jessica peaked the top of the single charts with two singles from the album; How Will I Know (Who You Are) and Tell Me What You like, both selling platinum. She also won two prizes at the awards show of Sweden's major pop radio station, NRJ: New Artist of the Year as well as Swedish Female Artist of the Year. No artist before her had won more than one award until then.

In 2000, two years after releasing her debut album, Jessica's second album came out, called Dino, nicknamed after one of her producers. Besides Europe and Asia, Jessica wanted to conquer the US as well this time around. However, since many Americans pronounced her surname similar to "fucker", she decided to change her name to Folker instead, without the c. Jessica's first single from the album, To Be Able To Love, became a hit in the States, with a remix by DJ Jonathan Peters spending ten weeks on the Billboard top 50 Dance Club Songs chart, and soon Jessica went on a club tour to New York and New Jersey.

Another of Jessica's songs – Lost Without Your Love – once again became the theme tune of another Korean film, Indian Summer. Again, Jessica reached the top of the South Korean airplay chart. In April 2001, Jessica's song Miracles was chosen as the theme melody for the Dutch Fame Academy replica, Starmaker. Due to this, she decided to release the song as her second single from the album, her sixth in total.

Jessica debuted in the Swedish national selection for the Eurovision Song Contest in 2005. In Melodifestivalen 2005, she performed Om natten. 2006 she tried again, participating in the third semi final heat of Melodifestivalen 2006 on 4 March with the song When Love's Comin' Back Again. She failed, however, to qualify for the semi-final. She returned to Melodifestivalen 2014 together with Dr Alban where they both performed the duet Around the World, which placed 5th in the heat and did not qualify for the final.

=== 2007 comeback ===
Jessica worked in the studio on her fourth album since 2006. After working with several labels she became signed with Indie Label Cosmos Records. Her album was released in 2007 under the title Skin Close which had an electronic/80's pop sound. It was her first English-record since 2000. The only song of the record that was released as a single was "Snowflakes". The album failed to make an impact on the public.

== Discography ==
=== Albums ===
Album and details	Peak positions					Notes
Album and details	SWE	AUT	NED	NOR	SWI	Notes
Jessica: Credited to Jessica; First studio album; Released: 1 September 1998; Label: Jive Records; Certified Gold (SWE); Certified Platinum (South Korea); Format: LP, cassette, CD	17	35	30	20	41	Track list: 1. Tell Me What You Like – radio edit 2. I Do; 3. How Will I Know (Who You Are); 4. Goodbye; 5. Falling in Love; 6. Tell Me Why; 7. Turned and Walked Away; 8. A Little Bit Longer; 9. If I Ever See Heaven Again; 10. Anywhere Is Paradise; 11. Private Eye
Dino: Credited to Jessica Folker; Second studio album; Released: 26 October 2000; Label: Jive Records; Format: LP, cassette, CD	26	—	—	—	47	Track list: 1. To be able to love 2. Missing you crazy 3. Crash like a wrecking ball 4. Tonight; 5. If I was your girl 6. I know love 7. Been and gone 8. Love you like a fool 9. Punk; 10. Miracles; 11. Wish I were the one 12. Dis-Moi Pourquoi; 13. Lost without your love 14. I don't wanna talk about it 15. Love you for all time
På svenska: Credited to Jessica Folcker; Third studio album; Released: 27 September 2005; Label: Transistor Music; Format: LP, CD, digital downloads	41	—	—	—	—	Track list: 1. Du kunde ha varit med mig 2. Vad gör jag nu 3. Låt mig alltid minnas dig så här 4. När du vänder dig bort 5. Om detta är ditt hem 6. Nu och när 7. Om du vill in i mitt liv 8. Kom till mig 9. Midnatts längtan 10. Vad gjorde jag fel 11. En annan sång 12. Om natten
Skin Close: Credited to Jessica Folcker; Third studio album; Released: 11 June 2007; Label: Cosmos; Format: LP, CD, digital downloads	—	—	—	—	—	Track list: 1. Never Wanna Lose You; 2. Hot Night; 3. Voices of Today; 4. Snowflakes; 5. Lost in Your Eyes; 6. Desperately; 7. Always Something; 8. Spell I'm Under; 9. Me Against the World; 10. On the Run; 11. You Belong to Me; 12. Spell I'm Under Part II

=== Singles ===
==== As lead artist ====
Year	Single	Peak positions								Album
Year	Single	SWE	AUT	BEL (Vl)	FRA	GER	NED	NOR	SWI	Album
1998	"Tell Me What You Like"	10	—	—	13	97	61	16	—	Jessica
1998	"How Will I Know (Who You Are)"	7	4	13	62	24	6	20	17	Jessica
1998	"Tell Me Why"	—	—	—	—	—	85	—	—	Jessica
1999	"I Do"	38	—	57	—	69	46	—	—	Jessica
1999	"Goodbye"	—	—	—	—	—	—	—	—	Jessica
2000	"To Be Able to Love"	17	—	—	—	—	84	—	50	Dino
2001	"Crash Like a Wrecking Ball"	16	—	—	—	—	—	—	90	Dino
2001	"Miracles"	—	—	—	—	—	30	—	—	Dino
2005	"Du kunde ha varit med mig"	38	—	—	—	—	—	—	—	På svenska
2005	"Om natten"	25	—	—	—	—	—	—	—	På svenska
2006	"When Love's Comin' Back Again"	38	—	—	—	—	—	—	—	Non-album release
2007	"Snowflakes"	—	—	—	—	—	—	—	—	Skin Close
2014	"Gravity"	—	—	—	—	—	—	—	—	Non-album release

Other releases

- 2001: "Lost Without Your Love"
- 2005: "Vad gör jag nu"
- 2005: "En annan sång"
- 2007: "Hot Night"
- 2013: "It's All About You"

==== As featured artist ====
Year	Single	Peak positions								Album
Year	Single	SWE	AUT	BEL (Vl)	FIN	GER	ITA	NOR	SWI	Album
2000	"Trehundra dar" (Blues feat. Jessica Folcker)	60	—	—	—	—	—	—	—	Blues album Ny tid, ny strid
2002	"(Crack It) Something Going On" (Bomfunk MC's feat. Jessica Folcker)	4	19	31	3	10	15	2	70	Bomfunk MCs album Burnin' Sneakers
2013	"Strong Enough" (Barnes & Heatcliff feat. Jessica Folcker)	—	22	—	—	—	—	—	—	
2014	"Around the World" (Dr. Alban feat. Jessica Folcker)	52	—	—	—	—	—	—	—	

Other releases featured in

- 1994: "U make me feel alright" (Amadin)
- 1995: "Electric" (Leila K, chorus)
- 2013: "Respect Yourself" (DJ Bobo & Jessica Folcker – from DJ Bobo album Reloaded)

== See also ==
- Melodifestivalen 2005 (semifinals)
- Melodifestivalen 2006 (semifinals)
