= Teknoaidi =

Tuomas Kinnunen
- Also known as: Teknojta; Teknoaidi; Zutsuu; Zutsuu=Teknoaidi
- Born: 1985
- Origin: Finland
- Genres: Hardcore techno Speedcore; World
- Instruments: FL Studio; Frame drum
- Labels: Kovaydin.NET

Teknojta (born Tuomas Kinnunen; 1985), better known as Teknoaidi, is a Finnish hardcore techno and speedcore musician. His music is influenced by folk, world music and noise. He describes his music with the term shamancore. Teknojta is a founder of the Kovaydin.NET and Ydinväki netlabels.

The artist's former alias is Zutsuu. Teknojta is also a member in the Hiiden Virren Vinguttajat duo.

== Discography ==
=== Albums ===
- The Source Field Manifestations (Splatterkore Reck-ords, 2012)
- Starseed Integration and Repatriation (K-NeT Label, 2015)

=== EPs ===
- Hiiden Virren Vinguttajat (Chase Records, 2012)
- Positive Phuture Timeline (Kovaydin.NET, 2017)
- Luontotietoisuus (Ydinväki, 2023)

=== Compilations ===
- Corekatsaus 2012 (Kovaydin.NET, 2012)
- Kovaydin.NET 10v – 10 Years of Suomicore (Kovaydin.NET, 2015)
- Speedcore Worldwide Sampler Vol.3 ^{unstoppable underground infection} (Speedcore Worldwide Audio Netlabel, 2015)
- Compulsive Speed Excess! (Speedcore Worldwide Audio Netlabel, 2016)
- Sounds From The Finnish Hardcore Techno Underground Vol. 2 (Kovaydin.NET, 2017)
- Celestial Fracture (Speedcore Worldwide Audio Netlabel, 2019)
- Sounds from the Finnish Hardcore Techno Underground Vol. 3 (Kovaydin.NET, 2020)
