= Jukka Kuoppamäki =

Finnish singer and songwriter (born 1942)

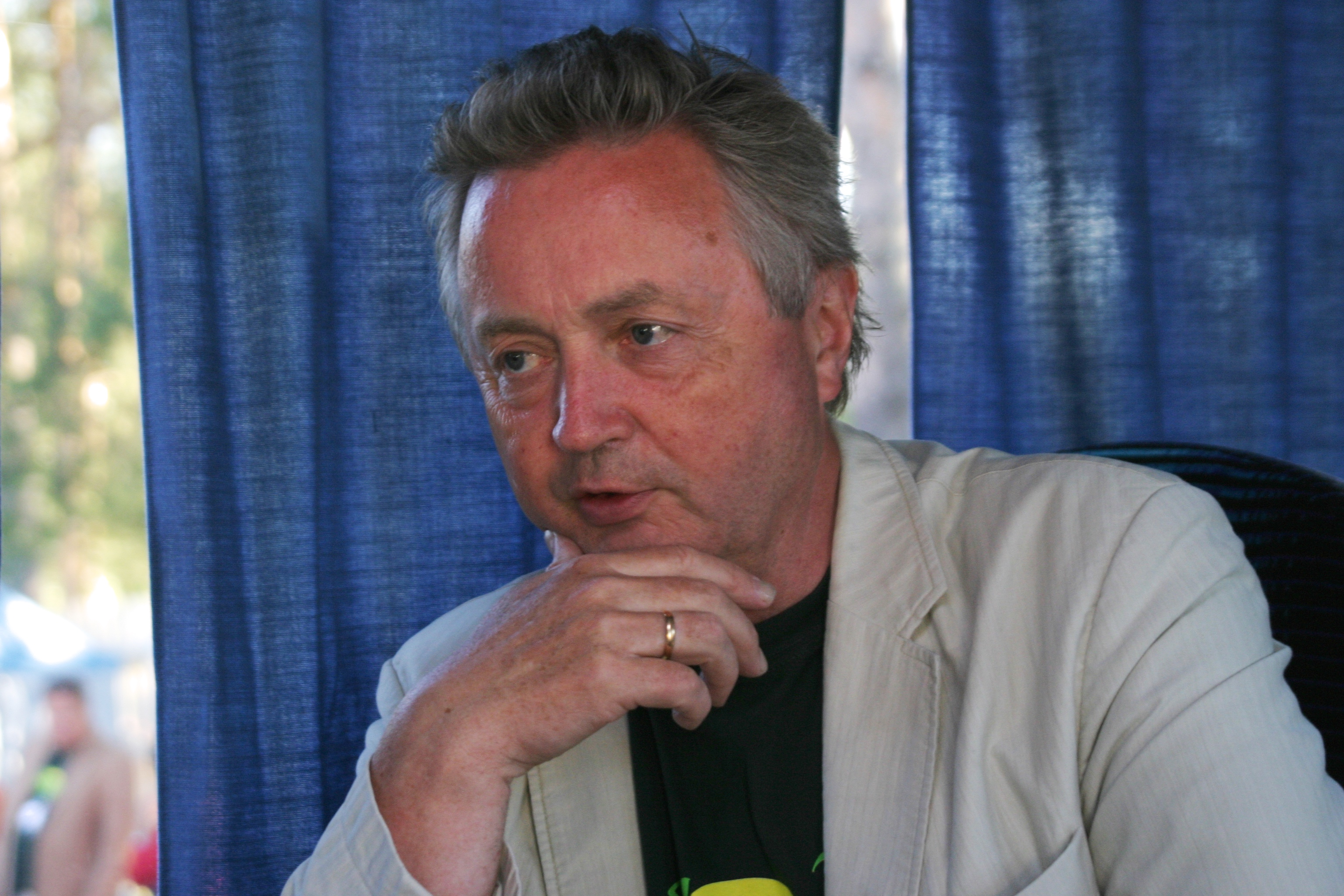
Jukka Kuoppamäki in 2006

Jukka Kuoppamäki (born 1 September 1942) is a Finnish singer, songwriter and priest for The Christian Community in Germany. He visits his summer house in Finland every year.

Born in Helsinki, he is one of the most prolific Finnish popular singer-songwriters and has written over 1,500 songs for himself and other famous Finnish singers including Jari Sillanpää and Katri Helena. The texts tell about Finland ("Sininen ja valkoinen", lit. 'Blue and white'), love, and longing. "Sininen ja valkoinen" became a mega hit. He has lived in Germany since 1977 with his wife Sirpa Kuoppamäki and some of their seven children.

== Discography ==
=== Albums ===
- Mitä kansa haluaa (1966)
- Rakkaus on sininen (1968)
- On the Rocks (1970)
- Kuoppamäki (1970)
- Trubaduurilauluja (1971)
- Take My Heart (1972)
- Valtatie (1972)
- Love (1972)
- Little Boy (1972)
- Highway (1973)
- Wounded Knee (1973)
- Blue and White (1973)
- Blau und Weiß (1973)
- Kultaa tai kunniaa (1973)
- Lapsuuteni lumijoulu (1973, with Piritta ja lapset)
- Aurinkomaa (1974)
- Väinämöinen (1974)
- Viivy vielä hetki (1975)
- Päng päng (1976)
- Miljoona hikistä kilometriä (1976)
- Pilvet (1977)
- Rakkautta maailmaan (1978)
- Puolesta, ei vastaan (1982)
- Kuningas tai kerjäläinen (1986)
- Joulu tulee laulamalla (1990, with Inka Kuoppamäki and Eeva-Leena Sariola)
- Kerran vielä palaan (1992)
- Laulun taika (1997, with Taika Kuoppamäki)
- Aika näyttää (1997)
- Joulun taika (1997, with Taika Kuoppamäki)
- Lemmen taika (1998, with Taika Kuoppamäki)
- Tästä alkaa rakkaus (1999)
- Sininen (2001)
- Vanhaa viiniä (2002)
- Romanssi (2003)
- Suuret tunteet (2006)
- Sininen ja valkoinen (2008, with Aikamiehet and Satakunnan Sotilassoittokunta)
- Kun maailma muuttui (2010)
- Kotiinpaluu (2012)
- Matkamiehen virsi (2013)
- Joutukaa sielut (2013)
- Perintö (2014)
- Miehen tie (2016)
- Sun kanssas kahden (2018)
- Kurkiaura (2020)
