= Dallas Superstars =

Finnish record producer duo

- Origin: Helsinki, Finland
- Genre: Electronica
- Years active: 2002–present
- Label: Universal
- Members: Heikki Liimatainen; Jaakko "JS16" Salovaara

Dallas Superstars is a Finnish Electronic music duo of Heikki "Bostik" Liimatainen and Jaakko "JS16" Salovaara, noted for internationally charting dance club hit, "Helium" of 2002. The achievement of this single (which came to #3 on the Finnish move outline) provoked further arrivals of Fast Driving, Ready To Go, I Feel Love (a revamp of the Donna Summer exemplary) and Crazy, and the collection from which these tracks came. In 2006 they delivered their subsequent collection called Higher State.

== "Helium" ==
The Dallas Superstar's first single was a dance track entitled "Helium", released in 2002. The success of this single (which reached #3 on the Finnish dance chart, and #64 in the UK Singles Chart) prompted further releases of "Fast Driving", "Ready To Go", "I Feel Love" (a cover version of the Donna Summer song) and "Crazy", and the album from which these tracks came.

== Flash ==
Flash (2004) was the Dallas Superstar's first album, which was released only in Finland and Sweden. The release of another album Higher State was announced from the official website in September 2005. The first single from Higher State was "Fine Day".

== Live ==
The Dallas Superstars live performances mostly consist of DJ sets, although they have played small gigs consisting of purely their own material.
