= Beats and Styles =

Finnish pop/rock/rap group

- Origin: Finland
- Genres: Pop; Rock; Rap

Beats and Styles is a Finnish pop/rock/rap group led by DJ Alimo and in the past also DJ Control, whose real name is Jaakko Manninen. Beats and Styles sings in English and has collaborated with wide variety of artists, such as Michael Monroe, Papa Dee, Toni Wirtanen, Raymond Ebanks, Andy McCoy and Jutty Ranx.

== History ==
The band was originally a duo, consisting of DJ Control (guitar, vocals) and DJ Alimo whose real name is Asmo Soivio (vocals). Alimo and Control started their career as DJs and club promoters. In 2000, they got their own club culture TV show on Helsinki local television. They became more and more interested in making music, and they made drum'n'bass music in solo and later Finnish language music under the name Alimo&Control. The Alimo&Control project's most famous song was "Tarkkaillaan", featuring Laura Närhi from Kemopetrol as the vocalist. In 2003, Alimo and Control released an album, This is... Beats and Styles, whose most famous songs were "Dynamite" and "Girls' Anthem".

In 2004, the duo released the album We're Not Ready Yet, whose most famous hit was "Renegades", sung by Michael Monroe and Alimo, as well as "Fire" and "Dance, Dance, Dance". In 2005, they released the album, Everything is Everything, whose most famous songs included "Invitation to the Dancefloor" and the title song "Everything is Everything", whose music video was shot in Prypiat near Chernobyl. Beats and Styles won a bronze award in the 2005 Muuvi music video competition and a special mention for productive and good quality video work. The group's music has been published in Sweden, Germany, Poland, Ukraine, France, Italy, United Kingdom, South Africa and Australia among other countries, but so far the duo has not achieved a true international breakthrough.

Beats and Styles released their fourth album Walk, Don't Talk on 14 February 2007. The album's first single was "Ocean Wave", featuring guest artist Michael Monroe from Hanoi Rocks. The video for "Ocean Wave" was shot in Fuerteventura and was directed by Kusti Manninen. The group also participated in the Finnish Eurovision Song Contest selection for the Finnish entry with their song "See the Signs", but got last place.

Soon after that Alimo stopped performing at the gigs and doesn't appear at all at the Beats and Styles album Schizosonics released on 16 September 2009. DJ Control said his departure was caused by musical differences: "Alimo didn't want to join the new album's pop vibes."

== Discography ==
- This is... Beats and Styles (2003)
- We're Not Ready Yet (2004)
- Everything is Everything (2005)
- Two White Monkeys (France) (2006)
- Walk, Don't Talk (2007)
- Straight Forward - The Best of Beats and Styles (2008)
- Schizosonics (2009)
