= Heikki L =

Finnish record producer

Heikki Liimatainen, known professionally as Heikki L, is a house music producer, DJ and remixer from Finland.

== Biography ==
Heikki Liimatainen has released music under different aliases like Heikki L, Supermodels From Paris, Syndicate of Beats, Dallas Superstars, Modulation, Moovon, Spectro, Hemohes and Bostik. Under his current alias, Heikki L, he has produced many big house tracks and also remixed many artists. Liimatainen has his own studio in Helsinki and also runs Finland's biggest House Club, Danceteria with his partner Jere Hyvönen. Heikki L is also a DJ and he has played together with DJs like Erick Morillo, Axwell, Sebastian Ingrosso.

== Chart positions ==
=== Singles ===
Title	Year	Peak chart positions
Title	Year	FIN
Let The Bass Kick	2007	4
Rising Sun (featuring Mia Permanto)	2007	5
Classic (featuring Max C)	2008	18
