= JS16 =

Finnish musician, DJ and record producer (born 1975)

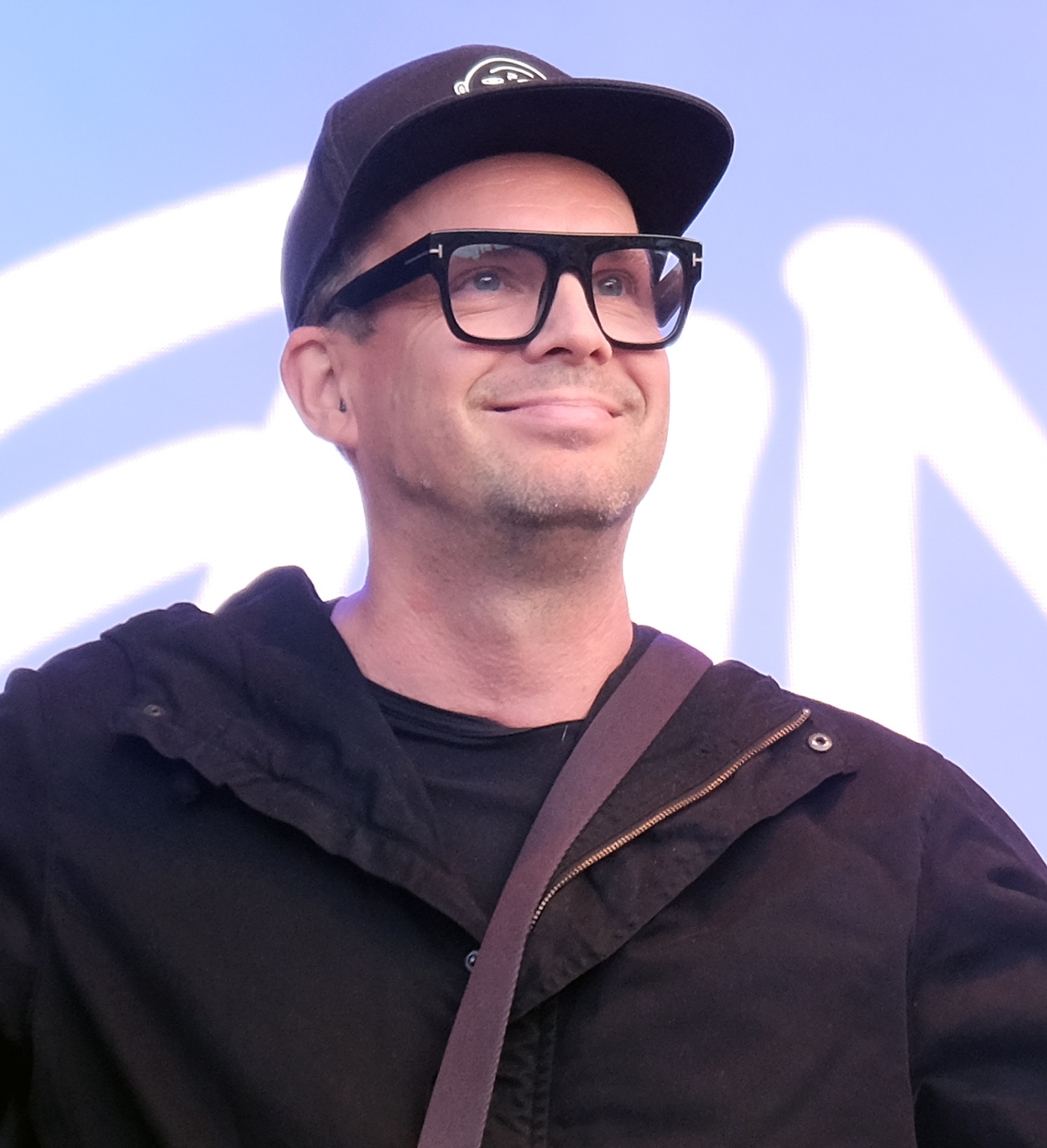
- Salovaara in 2022

Background information
- Born: Jaakko Sakari Salovaara; 13 January 1975 (age 51)
- Origin: Finland
- Occupations: DJ; record producer
- Years active: 1991–present
- Label: 16 Inch Records
- Website: js16.com

Jaakko Sakari Salovaara (born 13 January 1975), better known by his stage name JS16, is a Finnish musician, DJ and record producer. He is best known for his work with Finnish hip hop group Bomfunk MC's, producing their most successful song "Freestyler", and for his work with Finnish DJ and producer Darude, as well as other solo productions and remixes. He released his debut studio album, Stomping System in 1998. He is part of the DJ duo Dallas Superstars with Heikki L, and owns the dance music record label 16 Inch Records.

== Career ==
His first release was the 1991 single "Hypnosynthesis", at the age of 16 (hence the number 16 in his artist name). With the release of the club/dance music album Stomping System in 1998 and hits like "Stomp to My Beat" and "Love Supreme", he gained the Finnish audience's attention. Furthermore, the single "Stomping System" also reached #6 on the UK Club Chart.

JS16 has also gained fame by being the producer of Finnish electro-hop group Bomfunk MC's, with three albums and the European hit "Freestyler" (2000). He has also produced international club anthems like "Sandstorm" and "Feel the Beat" with Finnish DJ Darude.

In 2002, he produced the JS16 Remix and the JS16 Dub of Britney Spears' hit single "Overprotected". His remix was also included on the soundtrack of Spears' 2002 film Crossroads.

Currently, JS16 is producing for the Finnish group Mighty 44. Additionally, he is a member of the group Dallas Superstars, alongside his countryman Bostik (aka Heikki Liimatainen). Their debut album was 2003's Flash, with hits like "I Feel Love" (reached #1 on Finnish and Swedish dance charts) and "Fast Driving", #4 on the UK Club Chart in the summer of 2004.

== Discography ==
=== Albums ===
Studio albums

- Stomping System (1998)

Mix albums

- InTheMix (2000)
- Trancemania (2001)

=== Singles ===
As lead artist

- 1991: "Hypnosynthesis"
- 1992: "Untitled" (featuring Markku Lintula)
- 1997: "Stomping System" (UK #76, Aug 1998)
- 1997: "Stomp to My Beat"
- 1999: "Love Supreme" (UK #77, Apr 1999)
- 2007: "Rosegarden"
- 2008: "Lights Go Wild"
- 2012: "Hale Bopp" (with Orkidea)
- 2014: "Girls on Film" (with Erkka)
- 2019: "Don't Stop" (with Dex featuring Fiia)
- 2020: "In the Spot" (with Stella Mwangi featuring B.O.W.)

As featured artist

- 2009: Ola featuring JS16 - "PlayMe"
- 2011: Pandora featuring JS16 - "You Woke My Heart"
- 2016: Tom & Hills featuring JS16 - "Another Chance"
- 2018: JES featuring Joonas Hahmo and JS16 - "The One"

=== Remixes ===
- 2001: A-Teens - "Bouncing Off the Ceiling (Upside Down)" (JS16 Remix)
- 2019: Camille Jones — "The Creeps" (JS16 Remix)

=== Video games ===
"Stomp to My Beat" by JS16 was featured in 9 releases of the Dance Dance Revolution arcade series, plus Dancing Stage EuroMix. The song is also available in Dance Dance Revolution 2ndReMix and Dance Dance Revolution Best Hits for the Japanese PlayStation, and in DDRMAX for the North American PlayStation 2.

Song	Arcade game									
Song	2nd	3rd	Euro	4th	USA	5th	X3	2013	2014	A
"Stomp to My Beat"	Yes	Yes	Yes	Yes	Yes	Yes	Yes	Yes	Yes	(Note: "Stomp to My Beat" is exclusive to Asian releases of Dance Dance Revolution A, with song being removed from that game on May 30, 2016.)
