= Lycka =

Studio album by Björn Ulvaeus & Benny Andersson
- Released: November 1970
- Genre: Rock; folk rock
- Length: 30:58
- Label: Polar
- Producer: Benny Andersson, Björn Ulvaeus, Bengt Bernhag

Björn Ulvaeus & Benny Andersson chronology
| Lycka (1970) | Ring Ring (1973) |

Singles from Lycka
- 1. "Lycka / Hej gamle man!" Released: October 1970; 2. "Tänk Om Jorden Vore Ung" Released: November 1971

Lycka is a 1970 album released by folk/rock duo Björn Ulvaeus & Benny Andersson, who later became the male half of ABBA. Most of the songs feature lead vocals by Björn. The songs show the influence of Brian Wilson, "Ticket to Ride"-era Beatles and traditional Swedish folk music.

Lycka was produced by Björn and Benny with Bengt Bernhag and engineered by Michael B. Tretow. Benny and Björn played on the tracks with two Swiss musicians, drummer John Counz and bassist Gus Horn. Sven-Olof Walldoff was responsible for the orchestral arrangements, and on the 2006 re-release, bonus tracks were added, notably early recordings with the two-girl half of the future group ABBA on backing vocals, Anni-Frid Lyngstad who was engaged to Benny Andersson and Agnetha Fältskog who was married to Björn Ulvaeus. Three years later, Ring Ring became the first proper album release of what would become the most famous Swedish pop band ever (though the original album did not use ABBA as the main name of the group).

== Track listing ==
=== Standard edition ===
Side A
| No. | Title | Writer(s) | Length |
|---|---|---|---|
| 1. | "Lycka" | Benny Andersson, Stig Anderson, Björn Ulvaeus | 3:05 |
| 2. | "Nånting är på väg" | Andersson, Ulvaeus | 2:17 |
| 3. | "Kära gamla sol" | Andersson, Anderson, Ulvaeus | 2:24 |
| 4. | "Det där med kärlek" | Andersson, Peter Himmelstrand, Ulvaeus | 2:59 |
| 5. | "Välkommen in i gänget" | Andersson, Himmelstrand, Ulvaeus | 3:08 |
| 6. | "Lilla du, lilla vän" | Andersson, Anders Fugelstad, Ulvaeus | 2:48 |

Side B
| No. | Title | Writer(s) | Length |
|---|---|---|---|
| 1. | "Hej gamle man!" | Andersson, Ulvaeus | 3:20 |
| 2. | "Liselott" | Andersson, Agnetha Fältskog, Ulvaeus | 2:55 |
| 3. | "Kalles visa" | Andersson, Himmelstrand, Ulvaeus | 2:34 |
| 4. | "Ge oss en chans" | Andersson, Ulvaeus | 3:38 |
| 5. | "Livet går sin gång" | Andersson, Anderson, Ulvaeus | 3:50 |

=== Reissue ===
Side A
| No. | Title | Writer(s) | Length |
|---|---|---|---|
| 1. | "Tänk om jorden vore ung" | Benny Andersson, Björn Ulvaeus | 3:53 |
| 2. | "Lycka" | Andersson, Stig Anderson, Ulvaeus | 3:05 |
| 3. | "Nånting är på väg" | Andersson, Ulvaeus | 2:17 |
| 4. | "Kära gamla sol" | Andersson, Anderson, Ulvaeus | 2:24 |
| 5. | "Det där med kärlek" | Andersson, Peter Himmelstrand, Ulvaeus | 2:59 |
| 6. | "Välkommen in i gänget" | Andersson, Himmelstrand, Ulvaeus | 3:08 |
| 7. | "Lilla du, lilla vän" | Andersson, Anders Fugelstad, Ulvaeus | 2:48 |

Side B
| No. | Title | Writer(s) | Length |
|---|---|---|---|
| 1. | "Hej gamle man!" | Andersson, Ulvaeus | 3:20 |
| 2. | "Liselott" | Andersson, Agnetha Fältskog, Ulvaeus | 2:55 |
| 3. | "Kalles visa" | Andersson, Himmelstrand, Ulvaeus | 2:34 |
| 4. | "Ge oss en chans" | Andersson, Ulvaeus | 3:38 |
| 5. | "Livet går sin gång" | Andersson, Anderson, Ulvaeus | 3:50 |

=== 2006 re-issue track listing ===
The 2006 re-release contained the following additional tracks:

1. "She's My Kind of Girl" [Written for the Swedish movie Inga II: The Seduction of Inga, 1971]
2. "Inga Theme" [From the motion picture Inga II: The Seduction of Inga, 1971]
3. "Det kan ingen doktor hjälpa" ("It Can't Be Helped by a Doctor") [with Agnetha Fältskog & Anni-Frid Lyngstad backing vocals]
4. "På bröllop" [with Agnetha Fältskog & Anni-Frid Lyngstad backing vocals]
5. "Tänk om jorden vore ung" ("If We Only Had The Time") [with Agnetha Fältskog & Anni-Frid Lyngstad backing vocals]
6. "Träskofolket" ("The Clog People")
7. "En karusell" ("Merry-Go-Round") [with Agnetha Fältskog & Anni-Frid Lyngstad backing vocals]
8. "Att finnas till" ("To Exist")
9. "Hey, Musikant" (German version of "Hej gamle man!") [with Agnetha Fältskog & Anni-Frid Lyngstad backing vocals]
10. "Was die Liebe sagt" (German version of "Livet går sin gång")
11. "Love Has Its Ways"
12. "Rock 'n Roll Band" (Björn & Benny's version)
13. "Merry Go Round" (Björn & Benny's version) [with Agnetha Fältskog & Anni-Frid Lyngstad backing vocals]
14. "To Live With You" (English version of "Lycka" recorded in 1975 and first released in 2006)

== Personnel ==
- Benny Andersson - piano, keyboards, vocals
- Björn Ulvaeus - guitars, vocals

Additional musicians

- Gus Horn - bass guitar
- John Cuonz - drums
- Agnetha Fältskog - backing vocals
- Anni-Frid Lyngstad - backing vocals

Production

- Benny Andersson, Björn Ulvaeus, Bengt Bernhag - producers
- Benny Andersson, Björn Ulvaeus, Sven-Olof Walldoff - arrangements
- Michael B. Tretow - engineer

== See also ==
- ABBA
- 1970 in music
