= På Bröllop =

"Pa bröllop"

Song by Benny Andersson and Björn Ulvaeus
- Language: Swedish
- A-side: "Det kan ingen doktor hjälpa"
- Released: 1971
- Recorded: 23 April 1971
- Length: 3:07

Benny Andersson and Björn Ulvaeus chronology
"Hey, Musikant" (1971)	"Pa bröllop" (1971)	"Tänk Om Jorden Vore Ung" (1971)

"På Bröllop" (Translation: "At the Wedding") is a Swedish-language song written by Benny Andersson and Björn Ulvaeus. The song was recorded on 23 April 1971 and features Agnetha Fältskog and Anni-Frid Lyngstad on backing vocals.

"På Bröllop" was released as the B-side of "Det kan ingen doktor hjälpa" in the summer of 1971. After the wedding of Ulvaeus and Fältskog on 6 July 1971, where hundreds of fans and media outlets attended, this wedding themed song entered the Toppentipset (Svensktoppen) chart, at number 11 on 19 July 1971. The following week, the song reached its peak position number 9.

== Charts ==
Chart	Peak position
Sweden (Svensktoppen)	9
