= Tainton =

Tainton is a surname. Notable people with the surname include:

- Blossom Tainton-Lindquist (born 1962), Swedish singer, dancer, publisher, fitness coach, and personal trainer
- Graham Tainton (1927–2024), Swedish dancer and choreographer
- Trevor Tainton (born 1948), English footballer
