= Hej gamle man! =

"Hej, gamle man!"

Single by Benny Andersson and Björn Ulvaeus

from the album Lycka
- English title: Hello, Old Man!
- A-side: "Lycka"
- Released: October 1970
- Recorded: June 1970
- Songwriters: Benny Andersson; Björn Ulvaeus

Benny Andersson and Björn Ulvaeus singles chronology
"She's My Kind of Girl" (1970)	"Hej, gamle man!" (1970)	"Det kan ingen doktor hjälpa" (1971)

"Hej gamle man!" (Translation: Hello, old man!) is a Swedish-language song written and performed by Benny Andersson and Björn Ulvaeus, notable for being the first song to feature all four members of ABBA.

== Background ==
In 1966, Andersson and Ulvaeus had started to compose songs together. By 1969, Andersson and Ulvaeus had entered relationships with Anni-Frid Lyngstad and Agnetha Fältskog respectively. The four future ABBA members would often collaborate together. By the end of the year Andersson and Ulvaeus had recorded "She's My Kind of Girl", released as their first single as a duo in 1970 with little commercial success at the time.

In April 1970, the four future ABBA members all sang in their first concert during their holiday in Cyprus to the Swedish UN Peace-Keeping Force in Cyprus (UNFICYP) soldiers. Ulvaeus commented about the song, "We had been on holiday together, all four of us… and had been sitting around with two acoustic guitars, singing together and hearing how great it sounded." The song is inspired by an elderly Salvation Army soldier in Västervik, collecting money in the market square.

== Release ==
In October 1970, "Lycka" was released as a single with "Hej Gamle Man!' as the B-side. The four members (known as Festfolk) embarked on a tour and the song became a big hit in Sweden. Ulvaeus said "We included that song in our wretched show when we took it to the Strand in Stockholm… and it got absolutely the best audience reaction of all the numbers in the show." Lyngstad said "I don't think it would have become such a hit if Agnetha and I hadn't been on it." The song entered the Toppentipset chart in November 1970, but reached the top of the Svenkstoppen chart during December 1970 and January 1971.

All four members were invited to perform in Gothenburg for the Salvation Army's National Youth Council. Due to the success of the song, a German version was recorded, titled "Hey Musikant". In 2022, Ulvaeus sang an English language version, titled "Hey, Grand Ol’ Man" for Tomas Ledin’s 70th birthday concert.

== Charts ==
Chart	Peak position
Sweden (Kvällstoppen)	5
Sweden (Svensktoppen)	1

== Release history ==
Region	Date	Title	Label	Format	Catalog
Sweden	October 1970	"Lycka" / "Hej gamle man!"	Polar	7-inch vinyl	POS 1110
Norway	October 1970	"Lycka" / "Hej gamle man!"	Polar	7-inch vinyl	POS 1110
Germany	1971	"Hey, Musikant" / "Was die Liebe sagt"	BASF Cornet	7-inch vinyl	CQA 444
