= List of best-selling Swedish music artists =

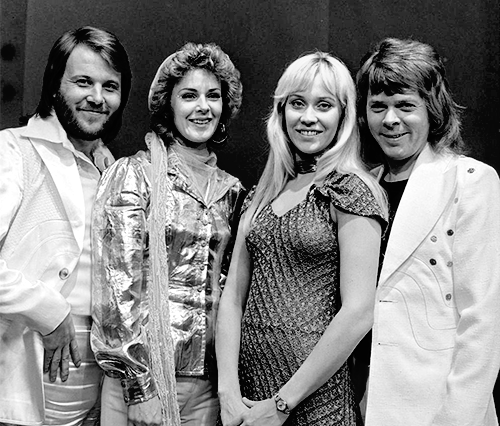
ABBA is the best-selling Swedish music artist

The list of best-selling Swedish music artists according to the newspapers.

== List ==
Artist	Sales
ABBA	150 million
Roxette	75 million
Ace of Base	50 million
Avicii	30 million
The Spotnicks	18 million
The Cardigans	15 million
Dr. Alban	14 million
Alcazar	12 million
Vikingarna	11 million
Europe	10 million
Swedish House Mafia	10 million
Rednex	10 million
Basshunter	8 million
Army of Lovers	7 million
A-Teens	6 million
Pandora	6 million
Eagle-Eye Cherry	4 million
