= She's My Kind of Girl =

1970 single by ABBA

- Cover of Japanese single

Single by Björn & Benny

from the album Ring Ring and Lycka
- Released: 1970; 1972 (Japan); 1973
- Recorded: 1969
- Genre: Folk rock
- Length: 2:39
- Label: CBS Sony
- Songwriters: Benny Andersson; Björn Ulvaeus
- Producers: Benny Andersson; Björn Ulvaeus

Björn & Benny singles chronology
"She's My Kind of Girl" (1970)	"Hej gamle man!" (1970)

Björn Ulvaeus singles chronology
"Partaj-Aj-Aj / Kvinnan I Mitt Liv" (1969)	"She’s My Kind of Girl" (1970)	"Hej gamle man!" (1970)

Audio video
- "She's My Kind of Girl" on YouTube

"She's My Kind of Girl" is a song written and performed by Benny Andersson and Björn Ulvaeus, then known as Björn & Benny and later famous as members of ABBA.

Written for the Swedish movie Inga II: The Seduction Of Inga, the song was recorded in November/December 1969, most likely at Europa Film Studios. The song was originally released in March 1970 as the first Björn and Benny single. Two years later it was released in Japan, hitting #1 and selling half a million copies. Because of that Benny and Björn were invited to perform in the World Popular Song Festival in Tokyo, November 1972 and they brought Frida and Agnetha with them.

The song was subsequently put on the B-side of the Swedish issue of ABBA's "Ring Ring" (English Version) single, and on the Ring Ring album in some other countries (in spite of it having been recorded before ABBA was formed and featuring no contribution from ABBA's other members, Agnetha Fältskog and Anni-Frid Lyngstad). The song is also unusual in that it is the only track in the entire catalogue that appears in fake stereo. To date, there is no known mono-only version.

This song was used in the soft porn film Inga II: The Seduction of Inga in 1971 (directed by Joseph W. Sarno), along with the song "Inga's Theme". This film was released in the U.S and Sweden, but became a bigger smash in the U.S.

In 1971, "She's My Kind of Girl" peaked at number 10 in the Danish Tipparaden chart.

== Charts ==
=== Weekly charts ===
Chart (1972)	Position
Japanese Oricon Singles Chart	6

=== Year-end charts ===
Chart (1972)	Position
Japanese Singles Chart	62

=== Sales ===
Region	Sales
Japan (Oricon)	188,000+

== Release history ==
Region	Date	Title	Label	Format	Catalog
Sweden	1970	"She's My Kind Of Girl" / "Inga Theme"	Polar	7-inch vinyl	POS 1096
France	1970	"She's My Kind Of Girl" / "Inga Theme"	Sava	7-inch vinyl	SV 45.550
Japan	Feb 1972	"She's My Kind Of Girl" / "Inga Theme"	Epic	7-inch vinyl	EPIC 83025
New Zealand	1972	"She's My Kind Of Girl" / "Inga Theme"	Family Label	7-inch vinyl	FAY 1055
