= En karusell =

1972 song by Björn Ulvaeus and Benny Andersson

Single by Björn Ulvaeus & Benny Andersson
- Released: April 1972
- Genre: Europop; pop
- Length: 3:06
- Label: Polar Music
- Songwriters: Benny Andersson; Björn Ulvaeus
- Producers: Benny Andersson; Björn Ulvaeus

Björn Ulvaeus & Benny Andersson singles chronology
"Tänk Om Jorden Vore Ung" (1971)	"En karusell" (1972)	"People Need Love"/"Merry-Go-Round" (1972)

"En karusell" was originally released in April 1972 as a 7" single in Sweden which was sung in Swedish and also in Japan where the song was titled "En Carousel" and sung in English. The song was included as the A-side song and was credited to Björn & Benny. Future members of ABBA Agnetha Fältskog and Anni-Frid Lyngstad did backing vocals on the song but were not credited for their contribution. The B-side song on the Swedish release was titled "Att finnas till" and the B-side song on the Japanese release was titled "Lycka".

"En karusell" failed to enter Svensktoppen (a popular top ten chart for songs in Swedish) but the B-side of the single "Att finnas till" lay on that chart for three weeks.

In English "Att finnas till" translates to "to exist".

== Track listing ==
1. A. "En karusell" - 3:06
2. B. "Att finnas till" - 3:32

== Chart positions ==
Chart (1972)	Position
Svensktoppen ("En karusell")	12
Svensktoppen ("Att finnas till")	6

== Merry-Go-Round ==
"Merry-Go-Round"

Single by Björn & Benny
- Released: 1972
- Recorded: March 29, 1972, Metronome studios, Stockholm
- Genre: Europop, Pop
- Length: 3:18
- Label: Polar Music
- Songwriters: Benny Andersson, Björn Ulvaeus
- Producers: Benny Andersson, Björn Ulvaeus

Björn & Benny singles chronology
"En Karusell" (1972)	"People Need Love" / "Merry-Go-Round" (1972)	"He Is Your Brother" (1972)

On 29 March 1972, "En Karusell" was recorded in English at Metronome Studio in Stockholm, Sweden and was credited to Björn & Benny, Agnetha & Anni-Frid. This English version was titled "Merry-Go-Round (En Karusell)" for the Swedish market and titled as "Merry-Go-Round" for other releases. "Merry-Go-Round" was included as the b-side song to the single "People Need Love" which was also released in 1972.

The single "People Need Love" was included on the album "Ring Ring" which was released in 1973 under Artist name Björn & Benny, Agnetha & Anni-Frid.

"Merry-Go-Round" made its CD debut on the 1994 "ABBA" compilation "Thank You For The Music (box set)" as track 5 on disc 4. The song also appeared as a bonus track on the 2001 re-issued and re-mastered album "Ring, Ring" under the artist name "ABBA".

The song was sampled in the Royce da 5'9" song Merry Go Round.

=== Track listing ===
1. A. "People Need Love" - 2:45
2. B. "Merry-Go-Round (En karusell)" - 3:18

=== Reception ===
The basic aim of the "People Need Love" single was not to promote the quartet but to promote the "Björn & Benny" duo, which was the singing and songwriting partnership of the two men. All four individuals had other commitments and therefore were not considering forming a permanent group. An example of this is the crediting; the single in most of the territories is credited to "Björn & Benny, Agnetha & Anni-Frid". The women were simply guesting as backing vocalists on the new "Björn & Benny" single. However, the positive audience reaction was unexpected.

The single made the Top 20 of the combined Swedish singles and albums chart, and "People Need Love" reached No. 3 on the Swedish radio chart show Tio i Topp (The Top Ten). It was the foursome's first charting record in the United States where it peaked at No. 114 on the Cashbox singles chart and No. 117 on Record World singles chart - impressive for unknown Swedish artists in America at the time. The Playboy Records U.S. release was credited to "Bjorn & Benny (with Svenska Flicka)" and according to ABBA's manager Stig Anderson, the single could have been a much bigger American hit if not for the limited distribution resources of the label that was unable to meet the demand from retailers and radio programmers.

At the time of the single's release, the Ring Ring album had not been planned since there was no intention to form a permanent group.

=== Chart positions ===
Chart (1972)	Position
Swedish Combined Singles/Albums Chart	17
Cashbox Singles Chart - USA	114
Record World Singles Chart - USA	117

== Cover versions ==
The song was covered by Anita Lindblom in 1972, during the same time of Björn & Benny’s version was released. Lindblom’s version charted in 11th place.

Chart (1972)	Position
Svensktoppen ("En karusell")	11

A Danish version by Grethe Ingmann peaked at number 9 in the Danish Dansktoppen chart.
