= ABBAMAIL =

- Final logo of ABBAMAIL in 2009. ABBAMAIL's website in 21 July 2007
- Website type: Musical fan site
- Owner: Whitread Pty. Ltd.
- Creator: Graeme Read
- Revenue: Mailing List Memberships / Web Shop
- Website: www.abbamail.com
- Commercial: Yes
- Launched: 13 January 1997
- Current status: Closed 28 October 2008

ABBAMAIL was an ABBA fan organisation on the Internet, based in Sydney, Australia. It was founded by Graeme Read and Grant Whittingham on 13 January 1997. The web site featured monthly columns, regular news updates, and a comprehensive archive including pictures, press releases and original articles. Revenue for the web site came from a subscription based e-mail list and an online store. It also contained a subscription-free forum and chat room. ABBAMAIL claimed to be one of the popular ABBA fan sites on the web, with over 25,000 unique hits per month. The web site was closed on 28 October 2008.

== Origins ==
The ABBAMAIL e-mail list went live on 13 January 1997 to give ABBA fans an unmoderated voice on the Internet. The incumbent list at the time, Abba-List, was criticised for not allowing freedom of speech.

Co-founders Graeme Read and Grant Whittingham (previously President and Treasurer of the Australian ABBA Fan Club from 1976 to 1983) brought their combined experience in managing such organisations to the new venture.

Hundreds of people initially joined the list, and within months the web site had been created. In addition to content provided by the founders, much content was provided by the e-mail list members.

== Conventions ==
ABBAMAIL was responsible for bringing fans together, both via the e-mail list and web site and via fan conventions held in Australia. The usual format of an ABBAMAIL convention was a welcome, followed by merchandise sales, rare or topical video presentations, a break for lunch, a guest speaker with question and answer sessions, followed by dinner and an ABBA disco.

The following conventions were held by ABBAMAIL in Sydney -

Australian Tour: 20 Year Celebration – March 1997. Special Guest – Annie Wright, who was an employee of RCA in the 1970s and accompanied the group on their Australian tour.

Women of ABBA – June 1997.

Summer Night City – November 1998.

The ABBA Generation – November 1999. Special Guest – Shelley Benson, who was Abba's promotional manager at RCA in the 1970s. According to ABBAMAIL founders, the event was inspired by Gabriel Zubowski, an ABBA fan from Poland.

CMP Down Under – September 2001. Special Guest – ABBA historian and author, Carl Magnus Palm.

MAD 05 – September 2005.

== The ABBAMAIL Effect ==
Through its ability to focus comments from a large number of ABBA fans into one forum, ABBAMAIL impacted parts of ABBA's music production, such as PolyGram and Universal Music re-releasing CDs in a corrected form. In 1997, all eight studio albums were remastered and re-released. Audiophiles among the fan group immediately noticed errors and problems with this mastering and discussed being disappointed by the quality of the covers. The original negatives were sourced for the cover art, resulting in the first clear covers since CDs had been released.

ABBAMAIL was also asked for assistance in locating additional material for the ABBA – In Concert DVD and the ABBA: The Movie DVD release. In his book, "Bright Lights, Dark Shadows – The Real Story of ABBA", author Carl Magnus Palm thanks the ABBAMAIL list along with many individual ABBAMAIL members who assisted him with his work.

Fans on the list connected initially via the e-mail list. These personal friendships have resulted in people travelling around the world in order to meet face to face.

== Controversy ==
In May 2006, ABBAMAIL were threatened with legal action by MIPI (Music Industry Piracy Investigations) working on behalf of Universal Music. ABBAMAIL had offered bootleg recordings of non-commercially available television appearances and home-recorded live concerts on CD. According to ABBAMAIL, Universal Music had known about this for several years and previously chose not to take any action.

Initially, they demanded all items in the web shop containing the ABBA logo to be removed from sale. This was completed. A new demand was issued demanding names and addresses of all ABBA fans who had purchased material from the site. This was not completed.

A campaign was begun with ABBAMAIL supporters e-mailing the record company and the group's representatives to protest the action. As of 15 September 2006, the legal action was complete at a cost of over A$4,000 in legal fees. MIPI advised they were happy with the compliance with their demands and no further action was pending.
