= Det kan ingen doktor hjälpa =

Single by Benny Andersson and Björn Ulvaeus
- Language: Swedish
- B-side: "På Bröllop"
- Released: 1971
- Recorded: 23 April 1971
- Length: 2:29

Benny Andersson and Björn Ulvaeus singles chronology
"Hey, Musikant" (1971)	"Det kan ingen doktor hjälpa" (1971)	"Tänk Om Jorden Vore Ung" (1971)

"Det kan ingen doktor hjälpa" (Translation: "It can't be helped by a doctor") is a Swedish-language song written by Benny Andersson, Björn Ulvaeus and Stig Anderson. The song was recorded on 23 April 1971 and features Agnetha Fältskog and Anni-Frid Lyngstad on backing vocals.

The song was entered by Andersson and Ulvaeus at Melodifestivalen 1971, the Swedish selection for the Eurovision Song Contest, but was rejected during the selection process. Three years later, Ulvaeus and Andersson alongside Fältskog and Lyngstad won the Eurovision Song Contest 1974 with "Waterloo" as ABBA.

Released as a single in the summer of 1971, on 25 July 1971, "Det kan ingen doktor hjälpa" was a minor hit. The song entered the Toppentipset (Svensktoppen) chart, at number 14. The following week, the song reached its peak position number 8.

== Charts ==
Chart	Peak position
Sweden (Svensktoppen)	8
