= Graham Tainton =

Swedish dancer and choreographer (1927–2024)

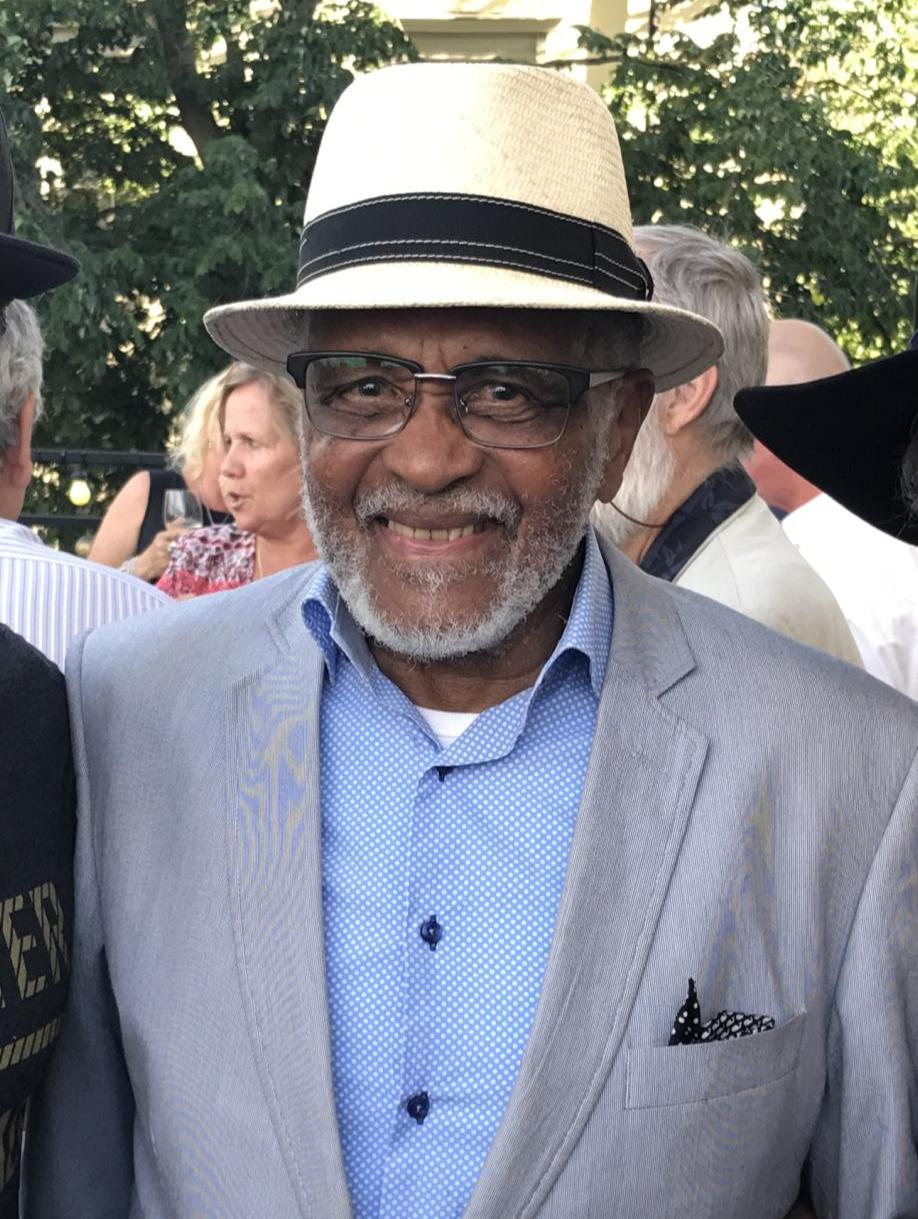
Tainton in 2017

Guthrie Graham Tainton (17 September 1927 – 6 December 2024) was a South African-born Swedish dancer and choreographer.

== Life and career ==
Tainton was born in South Africa on 17 September 1927. He came to Sweden in 1959 with a large music ensemble, The Golden City Dixies.

Tainton was ABBA's choreographer, and later appeared in UR's Living Room where he accounted for his early years in South Africa with Desmond Tutu as his priest and Nelson Mandela the lawyer who got him out of prison under apartheid. He was also in the jury and appeared on a Swedish TV show called Floor Filler. In 2016, 88-year-old Tainton was honoured and interviewed on the popular Let's Dance (Swedish TV series).

Tainton married Swedish Lill Sjöström in 1962 and they had a daughter Blossom Tainton-Lindquist that year. With his second wife Kristina Palmgren, also Swedish, he was the father of entertainment celebrities Kelly Tainton, Themba Tainton and David Tainton. Tainton was a cousin of Miriam Makeba. He died on 6 December 2024, at the age of 97, residing in Hägersten, Stockholm, Sweden.
