= Agnetha & Frida: The Voice of ABBA =

1994 compilation album by Agnetha Fältskog and Anni-Frid Lyngstad

Compilation album by Agnetha Fältskog and Anni-Frid Lyngstad
- Released: 1994
- Recorded: 1982–1984
- Genre: Pop, rock
- Length: 62:04
- Label: Karussell

Agnetha & Frida: The Voice of ABBA is a compilation album of songs by singers Agnetha Fältskog and Anni-Frid Lyngstad (Frida), members of the Swedish pop group ABBA, released in 1994. The compilation features a total of 14 tracks, seven from each singer.

== Reception ==
Professional ratings
Review scores
Source	Rating
AllMusic	2.5/5 stars

William Ruhlmann of AllMusic commented that "ABBA fans will recognize Faltskog's sweet voice and Frida's slightly edgier one, of course, but that's as much of the sound of ABBA as they will hear. The two singers each tried to meet the early-'80s pop/rock marketplace, with its reliance on synthesizers and stop-start dance rhythms, rather than copying the homogenized, neo-'60s pop of ABBA."

== Track listing ==
No.	Title	Artist	Length
1.	"The Heat Is On"	Agnetha	4:59
2.	"I Know There's Something Going On"	Frida	5:31
3.	"You're There"	Agnetha	3:32
4.	"To Turn the Stone"	Frida	5:19
5.	"Just One Heart"	Agnetha	3:47
6.	"That's Tough"	Frida	5:06
7.	"Turn the World Around"	Agnetha	4:19
8.	"I Got Something"	Frida	4:06
9.	"We Should Be Together"	Agnetha	4:02
10.	"Shine"	Frida	4:43
11.	"I Won't Let You Go"	Agnetha	3:43
12.	"Here We'll Stay"	Frida (with Phil Collins)	4:06
13.	"Wrap Your Arms Around Me"	Agnetha	5:17
14.	"Heart of the Country"	Frida	4:38
Total length:			35:19
