= Shine (Frida song) =

1984 song by Anni-Frid Lyngstad

Single by Frida

from the album Shine
- B-side: "That's Tough"
- Released: 31 August 1984
- Studio: Studio de la Grande Armée (Paris)
- Genre: Pop rock; new wave
- Length: 3:39 (single edit); 4:39 (album version); 6:31 (extended mix)
- Label: Polar
- Songwriters: Kevin Jarvis; Guy Fletcher; Jeremy Bird
- Producer: Steve Lillywhite

Frida singles chronology
"Time" (1983)	"Shine" (1984)	"Come to Me (I Am Woman)" (1984)

"Shine" is a song by the Swedish singer Anni-Frid "Frida" Lyngstad. It was released as the lead single from her second English-language solo album Shine (1984) on 31 August 1984.

== Song history ==
The song was recorded at the Studio de la Grande Armée, Paris during the last week of March 1984. Prior to the recording of the song, the majority of the songs already recorded for the album were sent to executive producer and ABBA manager Stig Anderson who disapproved of the state of the album and therefore suggested that Shine, written by Kevin Jarvis, Guy Fletcher and Jeremy Bird, be rearranged and recorded for the album. In the additional recording sessions, an unreleased demo version was recorded, followed by an extended version, released on the 12” single pressings, as well as Chemistry Tonight, a song written during the recording sessions by Peter Glenister, Simon Climie and Kirsty MacColl. Stig Anderson was still not happy with the three songs recorded, and sent them off on a cassette tape to Atlantic Records. Shine and Chemistry Tonight were completed after the initial recordings, where a shorter mix based on the extended version of Shine was recorded and then included on the album Shine.

== Music video ==
A music video was recorded in London, directed by Stuart Orme alongside Twist In The Dark for the release of the two singles. It took three days to record Shine.

== Release and reception ==
The single was first released in Europe on 31 August 1984 and on 10 September in the UK. A 12" single containing the extended mix was released on 17 September, with a white sleeve with a picture of Frida with a neon green and pink colour scheme. Both pressings included a non-album track, "That's Tough", co-written by Frida.

The singles were promoted largely in the countries where the previous album and singles had had most success. Due to the lack of success of her previous work in the UK, there was little promotion done there, resulting in a low placement on the UK Charts (#82). The Daily Mirror reviewed the song as “The best solo single yet from ABBA’s Frida although it will probably take you a couple of plays to appreciate it”.

Despite the success of Something's Going On in the American market, Atlantic Records did not release the album Shine or its singles in the US.

The song performed modestly in the charts in Europe and there were mixed reviews of the single.

== Track listings ==
7-inch vinyl

- A: Shine (Single Edit) – 3:39
- B: That's Tough – 4:59

12-inch vinyl

- A: Shine (Extended Mix) – 6:27
- B: That's Tough – 4:59

== Personnel ==
Taken from the "Shine" single liner notes.

- Anni-Frid Lyngstad – lead vocals
- Peter Glenister – electric and acoustic guitars
- Simon Climie – keyboards, synthesizers, and harpsichords
- Mark Brzezicki – drums
- Marc Chantreau – percussion
- Rutger Gunnarsson – bass
- Kirsty MacColl and Simon Climie – backing vocals

== Charts ==
Weekly chart performance for "Shine"
Chart (1984)	Peak position
Belgium (Ultratop 50 Flanders)	9
European Hot 100 Singles (Eurotipsheet)	85
Netherlands (Dutch Top 40)	23
Netherlands (Single Top 100)	19
Sweden (Sverigetopplistan)	6
UK Singles (OCC)	82
West Germany (GfK)	51
