= Robin Shaw (lawyer) =

British media lawyer (1959–2025)

Robin Henry Ledgard Shaw (2 January 1959 – 5 September 2025) was a British solicitor who practised as a media and defamation lawyer. Much of his work was for Private Eye and The Daily Telegraph.

== Early life ==
Born in West Sussex, Shaw was the only son of David Ledgard Shaw, an accountant and business partner of Robert Stigwood and Brian Epstein, and of his wife Paula Gisborne. He had two sisters. His grandfather, Walter Ledgard Shaw, was the son of a prosperous Lancashire glass bottle manufacturer of the same name.

Shaw spent most of his childhood in Norfolk. He was educated at Ludgrove School and then from 1969 to 1975 at Gresham's School, Holt. He began to train as an accountant, but soon gave that up to become an articled clerk at the law firm of Wright Webb Syrett, where he worked for the show business solicitor Oscar Beuselinck, who was principal solicitor for Private Eye and represented Robert Maxwell, Sean Connery, Richard Harris, and Mia Farrow.

== Career ==
Shaw qualified as a solicitor in 1983. The firm led by Beuselinck was taken over by Davenport Lyons, where Shaw was a partner from 1995.

After taking over as the main legal advisor to Private Eye, in 2009 for the magazine Shaw fought off an injunction against publication of a Law Society disciplinary decision on Michael Napier. He worked for Private Eye for some forty years and once said of it "If I were to try to make an issue of the Eye non-libellous, it would just be blank pages. My job is to help them get away with as much as they can." In 2011, for Private Eye, he got a judge to relax a superinjunction banning the reporting of an extramarital affair of the BBC's Andrew Marr.

In 2010, working for HarperCollins, Shaw defeated an injunction sought by the BBC to stop the publication of the autobiography of the racing driver Ben Collins ('the Stig' in Top Gear), which was then published as planned. On the successful conclusion of this case in September 2010, The Times named Shaw as Lawyer of the Week. Shaw later commented on the case

It is important that the media stand up to attempts by large corporations and wealthy individuals to control what is published by threats of injunctions and huge legal costs, when based on spurious grounds.

In 2014, Shaw became a partner at Ince Gordon Dadds, and in 2022 joined Wiggin LLP as a litigator.

In 2018, for The Daily Telegraph he saw off Philip Green's application for an injunction to stop the publication of allegations of sexual harassment by Green. In 2025, he successfully defended The Guardian in a libel action brought by the Doctor Who actor Noel Clarke.

The Guardian said of Shaw in an obituary, "He secured landmark victories for freedom of speech and overturned oppressive privacy injunctions". It also noted that Shaw was known for his "dry, irreverent wit" and was "unflappable and unflashy".

== Personal life ==
Shaw married Rupina Ahluwalia in 2008, after they had been together for some fifteen years. They lived in London and Norfolk. Outside the law, his main interest was in opera, and he often visited the Royal Opera House and Glyndebourne.

He was survived by his wife and his ninety-year-old mother, who had outlived all three of her children.
