= Blackout (game show) =

1988 American television game show

- Genre: Game show
- Created by: Jay Wolpert
- Written by: Joel Hecht; Jay Wolpert; Jon Field; Meredith Kornfeld
- Directed by: John Dorsey
- Presented by: Bob Goen
- Voices of: Johnny Gilbert; Jay Stewart
- Theme music composer: Chip Lewis / Middle "C" Productions
- Country of origin: United States
- Original language: English
- No. of seasons: 1
- No. of episodes: 65

Production
- Executive producer: Jay Wolpert
- Production locations: CBS Television City; Hollywood, California
- Running time: approx. 26 minutes
- Production companies: Jay Wolpert Productions; Taft Entertainment Television Inc.

Original release
- Network: CBS
- Release: January 4 – April 1, 1988

Blackout is an American game show that was broadcast on CBS as part of its daytime schedule from January 4 to April 1, 1988. The program was created and produced by Jay Wolpert. The game features two contestants, each paired with a celebrity. Contestants attempt to solve word puzzles consisting of a sentence or short paragraph with four blank spaces. Players guess each missing word based on hearing clues recorded by their partner, but with the playback being muted or "blacked out" at certain places by their opponent.

Bob Goen served as the host for Blackout (which was his first game show that he hosted for CBS). The show's original announcer was Johnny Gilbert, with Jay Stewart substituting for the final two weeks of shows due to Gilbert falling ill. This was Stewart's final announcing job before his 1989 death.

== Gameplay ==
=== Main game ===
Two teams, each consisting of a contestant and a celebrity partner, played. One of the players was usually a returning champion and sat at a yellow desk with his/her partner, while the challenger's team played from a red desk.

The object of the game was to solve word puzzles that consisted of a sentence or short paragraph with four blank spaces, usually incorporating a pun or play on words. Each blank represented a word, and the object of the game was for one of the players to guess the word based on clues provided by their partner, then use the words to complete the puzzle. A typical example: "The _____ wasn't _____, he just had a _____ in his _____." With the words "sick," "code," "spy," and "nose," the solution would be: "The spy wasn't sick, he just had a code in his nose."

Play in the first round began with the red team. The celebrity was shown one of the four missing words and had 20 seconds to describe it, while the contestant donned a pair of headphones and his/her seat was moved forward to prevent him/her from seeing or hearing anything. The celebrity's description was recorded, and was played back for the contestant after time expired.

Both members of the opposing team were able to hear the entire description. The celebrity of that team had control of a plunger known as a "blackout button," which he/she could press to silence ("black out") portions of the recording as it was played back. The blackout button could be used for a maximum of seven seconds, plus one extra second for every word duplicated in the description.

If the contestant correctly guessed the word, he/she won $100; an incorrect response allowed the opposing team to attempt it. The team that guessed the word was then given a chance to solve the puzzle, and successfully doing so scored one point. If neither team guessed a word, it was put up on the board and play continued with the next word. Teams alternated describing the four words in the puzzle. Saying the word or any form of it, or making a sound similar to the word in the description, immediately awarded $100 and a free guess at the puzzle to the opposing team. If both teams missed the fourth word, Goen read a definition of it as a toss-up, and the first team to buzz in with the answer received the $100 and a guess at the puzzle. If the team that guessed the fourth word failed to solve the puzzle, their opponents were given a chance to solve it.

For the second round, the contestants described words for their celebrity partners and operated the blackout buttons, and the yellow team played first, with the $100 per word still awarded to the contestant.

The first team to score two points won the game and advanced to the Clue Screen bonus round. If the score was tied after two puzzles, a sudden-death tiebreaker was played using one final word, with the contestants again in control of giving clues and blacking out. The team that had correctly guessed more words during the first two rounds (or the winner of a backstage coin toss if there was a tie) chose to either play the word or pass to the opponents. The contestant giving clues had 10 seconds to describe the word for his/her partner, and the opposing contestant had three seconds of blackout time, with the same repetition penalty as in the first two rounds. A correct guess won the game, while a miss or giving a form of the word during a description gave the win to the opposing team.

=== Clue Screen ===
In the Clue Screen round, the object was for one team member to guess five subjects within 70 seconds, based on the other deciding how many clues to give to him/her. The giver faced a screen on which the clues were shown, while the guesser faced away from it.

The clock started when the category for the first subject (Place, Thing, etc.) was displayed on the screen. Up to six clues would be shown, one every two seconds. Once the giver felt that there was enough information on the screen for his/her partner to guess, he/she would say, "Solve it!" The guesser then turned to face the screen, read all the displayed clues, and could offer one guess, or pass. The host announced whether the guess was correct or incorrect, and the guesser turned away from the screen as a new subject was played. The contestant won $10,000 if the team solved five subjects before time ran out, or $250 per correct response otherwise.

Champion contestants remained on the show until they had either played the Clue Screen round five times or were defeated in the main game.

=== Set ===
Blackout was taped in Studio 33 at CBS Television City in Hollywood, California.

== Broadcast history ==
Blackout debuted at 10:00 AM on January 4, 1988 and took the place of The $25,000 Pyramid, which had been cancelled by CBS after five and a half seasons. Blackout never managed to find an audience, however. NBC's Sale of the Century routinely beat it in the ratings, and Blackout did not perform as well as Pyramid had in the slot. CBS, unsatisfied with the performance, decided to move in another direction. Blackout was cancelled following its initial sixty-five episode order, which ended on April 1, 1988, and the network began working on a revival of Family Feud which would launch later in the year. Blackout's temporary replacement was its predecessor, as The $25,000 Pyramid was brought back for a final run of sixty-five episodes while Family Feud was waiting to debut; Pyramid aired its final episode on CBS on July 1, 1988 and was replaced by Family Feud the following Monday.

Blackout has not been seen on television since its cancellation by CBS.

A brief clip of the pilot episode, which was hosted by Robb Weller, was seen in the background during the opening sequence of the ABC miniseries The Stand in 1994.

== International versions ==
Country	Title	Host	Network	Premiere	Finale
Belgium	Blanco	Herbert Bruynseels	VTM	1991	1991
Netherlands	Blackout	Bert van Leeuwen	EO Network	1991	1992
United Kingdom	Take the Plunge	Su Pollard	ITV	October 4, 1989	December 6, 1989
