= David Dundas (musician) =

British musician and actor (born 1945)

Lord David Dundas
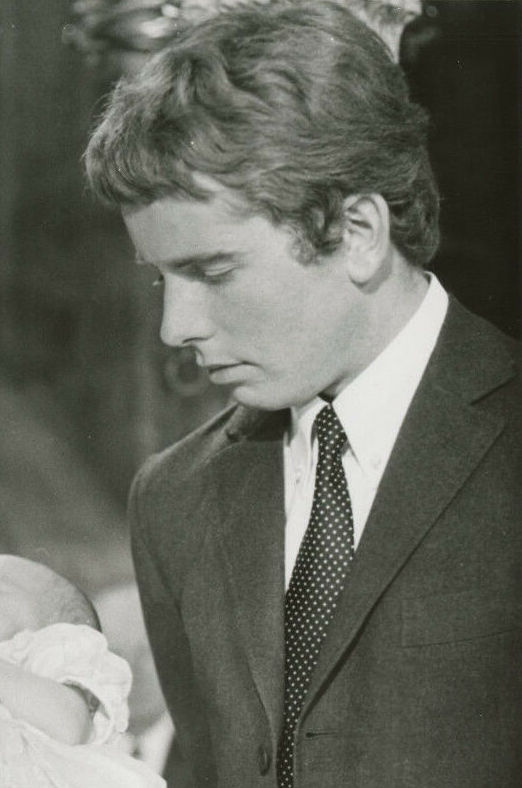
- Dundas in Prudence and the Pill (1968)
- Born: David Paul Nicholas Dundas; 2 June 1945 (age 81); Oxford, England
- Education: Royal Central School of Speech and Drama
- Occupations: Musician, actor
- Years active: 1968–present

Lord David Paul Nicholas Dundas (born 2 June 1945) is an English musician and actor, best known for his chart success in the pop genre during the 1970s, including his biggest hit "Jeans On", as well as his later career in film and television scores.

== Biography ==
Dundas was born in Oxford, the second son of the 3rd Marquess of Zetland and his wife, Penelope Pike. As a younger son of a marquess, he is entitled to the courtesy title 'Lord'. He was educated at Harrow and the Central School of Speech and Drama. While at the Central School, Dundas shared a house on Albert Street in Camden Town with actor Vivian MacKerrell and film director Bruce Robinson, which his parents bought for him; eventually, according to Dundas himself, "15 people were living there – there were three bedrooms". Those years served as the basis for Robinson's unpublished memoir and the film Withnail & I (1987). Dundas co-wrote the score for the film, considered "one of Britain's biggest cult films".

On 17 December 1971, Dundas married Corinna Maeve Wolfe Scott, and they had two children. They divorced in 1995. Dundas then married Taina Bettina Breuckmann on 21 November 1997, and they had one son.

== Musical career ==
His 1976 single "Jeans On" reached No. 3 in the UK Singles Chart, No. 17 on the US Billboard Hot 100, and No. 1 in the German Singles Chart, where the song remained 19 weeks in the Top Ten. The song originally appeared as a television advertising jingle for Brutus Jeans (the words used in the jingle – "I pull my Brutus jeans on" – were replaced with "I pull my old blue jeans on" for the single release). The single was later sampled by Fatboy Slim for his track "Sho Nuff" which was also used in an advertisement in 2006 for the SEAT Ibiza. Dundas's follow-up single, "Another Funny Honeymoon" was a medium-sized hit, reaching No. 29 in the UK. Dundas performed the song live on the BBC Television show, Top of the Pops, in 1977. A later single, "Where Were You Today", based on a C&A radio commercial ("Come and C and A" being replaced by the song title) was less successful. Jingles made by Dundas for Capital Radio were played daily on the station in the 1970s: "Grab a little piece of heaven, with Roger Scott from 3 to 7" and "Get a little soft rock, country, blues, with Tony Myatt from 11 to 2". Dundas co-wrote the song "Come to Me (I Am Woman)", which was recorded by ABBA singer Frida and included on her 1984 album, Shine. The following year it was recorded and released as a single by actress Su Pollard. In the 1980s, he also composed the theme tunes for the idents of Channel 4, Video Collection International and ITV.

== Discography ==
=== Albums ===
- 1977 David Dundas (AUS No. 82)
- 1978 Vertical Hold
- 1987 Withnail and I [Motion Picture Soundtrack]

=== Singles ===
Year	Single	Peak chart positions							Certifications
Year	Single	UK	AUS	CAN	GER	IRE	NZ	US	Certifications
1976	"Jeans On"	3	3	13	1	3	14	17	BPI: Silver
1977	"Another Funny Honeymoon"	29	14	—	6	—	38	—	
1977	"Fly Baby Fly"	—	—	—	—	—	—	—	
1977	"Stick on Your Lollipop"	—	—	—	—	—	—	—	
1978	"Guy the Gorilla"	—	—	—	—	—	—	—	
1978	"When I Saw You Today"	—	—	—	—	—	—	—	
1979	"It Ain't Easy"	—	—	—	—	—	—	—	
"—" denotes releases that did not chart or were not released in that territory.

== Film and television (as an actor) ==
- 1968 City '68 (TV series) – Tony Lambert
- 1968 A Man of our Times (TV series) – Roy
- 1968 Pere Goriot (TV mini-series) – Eugène de Rastignac
- 1968 Prudence and the Pill – Tony Bates
- 1968 Boy Meets Girl (TV series) – Mic
- 1969 ITV Saturday Night Theatre (TV series) – Matthew Fairchild
- 1969 Mosquito Squadron – Flight Lieutenant Douglas Shelton, RAF
- 1971 Paul Temple (TV series) – Joe Brand
- 1972 Shelley (TV movie) – Thomas Jefferson Hogg
- 1973 Weir of Hermiston (TV series) – Frank Innes
- 1975 Churchill's People (TV series) – Prince Edward
- 1986 When the Wind Blows – credited as an actor

== Film and television (as a musician) ==
- 1971 Private Road – co-wrote original score with Michael Feast and George Fenton.
- 1972 Weir of Hermiston, BBC Scotland.
- 1982 Fourscore – music for the launch of Channel 4, used for over ten years but no longer featured on the channel.
- 1983 Daybreak – start up music for TV-am in its early years, also used as the theme to the hour-long early morning news programme of the same name (also on TV-am), initially presented by Robert Kee;
- 1986 'Gilding the Lily' – piano score in the style of Erik Satie for the iconic TV commercial for Simple skincare in which robotic arms spray a pristine white lily with colouring and perfume;
- 1987 Withnail and I, original score;
- 1989 How to Get Ahead in Advertising, co-wrote original score with Rick Wentworth;
- 1989 Get Ready – for the rebranding of ITV by English Markell Pockett (and later used in the idents for Border Television in the mid-1990s, it was also used for Tyne Tees Television's non ITV generic idents from 1991 to 1992);
- 1992 Freddie as F.R.O.7, co-wrote original score with Rick Wentworth.
- c. 1993 Television commercials for the Kraft General Foods, Inc. product, "Country Time Lemonade Drink Mix" featured a Dundas composition called "I Keep Your Picture" as background music.
- 1998 – another ITV rebranding, under the title "Television from the Heart", for FutureBrand English & Pockett.

== See also ==
- List of 1970s one-hit wonders in the United States
