= Velly Joonas =

Estonian musician and writer

- Born: Velly Joonas; 9 June 1955 (age 71); Kohtla-Järve, then part of Estonian SSR, Soviet Union
- Genres: Soul
- Occupations: singer; teacher; writer; artist
- Instruments: vocals; guitar
- Years active: unknown–present
- Label: Frotee

Velly Joonas (born 9 June 1955) is an Estonian musician, songwriter, painter and poet, and a former member of amateur groups Vstretša and Pirita. Velly has written almost 300 songs, 30 poem anthologies and has had her works exhibited in art galleries. Two of her best known songs are "Stopp, seisku aeg!" (a cover of Anni-Frid Lyngstad’s I See Red,) and "Käes on aeg" (a cover of Roberta Flack's Feel Like Makin' Love,) the former being "not her favourite" and that she finds the latter "more akin to her taste."

Joonas grew up in Tõrva, one of five children. Her mother died when she was very young and she spent several years in an orphanage before being returned to her father. She graduated from Tõrva Secondary School in 1973. Afterward, she studied at the Estonian Philharmonic in Tallinn and the Lunacharsky State Institute for Theatre Arts (GITIS) in Moscow. She was inspired to become a musician in her youth by performers Georg Ots, Heli Lääts, and Voldemar Kuslap. She currently resides in Vahenurme and works as a teacher at the Vahenurme kindergarten-primary school. She has exhibited her oil paintings at several venues in Estonia.
