= Something's Going On =

Studio album by Frida
- Released: 10 September 1982
- Recorded: 15 February ‒ 31 March 1982
- Studios: Polar, Stockholm; AIR, London
- Genres: Pop; rock
- Length: 43:55
- Labels: Polar; Epic; Atlantic
- Producers: Phil Collins and Hugh Padgham

Frida chronology
Frida ensam (1975)	Something's Going On (1982)	Shine (1984)

Singles from Something's Going On
- 1. "I Know There's Something Going On" Released: August 1982; 2. "To Turn the Stone" Released: October 1982; 3. "I See Red" Released: December 1982 (SA); 4. "Tell Me It's Over" Released: January 1983 (Japan); 5. "Here We'll Stay" Released: April 1983

Something's Going On is the third solo album by Swedish singer Anni-Frid Lyngstad (Frida), one of the founding members of the Swedish pop group ABBA and her first album recorded entirely in English. Her previous two albums had been recorded in Swedish. Recorded in early 1982 during the final months of ABBA, the album was released on 10 September of that same year.

Produced by Phil Collins with Hugh Padgham, the album featured a harder-edged and more rock-oriented sound than the music she had previously recorded with ABBA and it included Collins' distinctive gated reverb drum sound. The record was met with a positive reception by both critics and the public, with sales in excess of 1.5 million copies, making it the best-selling solo record of any of the ABBA members to date. The album has since been re-released several times, including a 2005 remastered version that contained several bonus tracks. Promotional videos from the album are included in the DVD documentary titled Frida – The DVD.

== History ==
In 1982, Frida felt it was time to record a solo album again, this time in English and aimed at the international market. ABBA were spending less and less time together. Going through her divorce from fellow band member Benny Andersson, Frida had heard Phil Collins' "In the Air Tonight", (as recommended to her by her daughter) and then listened to the album it appears on, Face Value, "non-stop for eight months". As Collins himself put it in a TV interview: "Frida and I had something in common as far as our divorces were concerned. We were both the injured party." Polar Music approached Collins, asking if he would be interested in producing Frida's new solo album. He accepted the offer, thus making this his second album to be recorded at Polar Studios, the first being Genesis' Duke (1980).

Polar Music sent out invitations to publishing companies around the world, announcing Frida's plans and asking for songs suitable for the project. The response was overwhelming; more than 500 songs came into the Polar Music offices in Stockholm. Elvis Costello (who submitted a song called "I Turn Around") was one of the many who had their work rejected. Among the composers who made it to the album's final track list were Bryan Ferry, Stephen Bishop, Rod Argent and Russ Ballard. The Giorgio Moroder/Pete Bellotte composition "To Turn the Stone" was originally written for Donna Summer's 1981 album I'm a Rainbow – a double set for Geffen Records which for various reasons would remain in the archives until 1996. Frida also asked Per Gessle, later of Roxette, to set Dorothy Parker's bittersweet poem "Threnody" to music. A re-interpretation of the Face Value track "You Know What I Mean" – a song especially close to her heart, both musically and lyrically – was also included. The song "Here We'll Stay" had previously been recorded and performed by singer Sonia Jones for the UK pre-selection for the 1980 Eurovision Song Contest. On the album, it was recorded as a duet with Phil Collins, although he wasn't credited. When it was decided to release the song as a single in 1983, Frida re-recorded the song as a solo version.

== Recording ==
Recording began at Polar Studios, Stockholm, on 15 February 1982 and continued until 31 March. Earth Wind & Fire's horn players (the Phenix Horns) – also an important part of the Face Value album – came to Stockholm for a two-day visit. Strings, orchestra, and harp were later recorded at George Martin's Air Studios in London in the attendance of both Martin and Paul McCartney. Produced at a time when most commercial recordings used only analog technology, the album was one of the few to be both digitally recorded and mixed, predating Dire Straits' Brothers In Arms by almost three years.

At the time of recording Something's Going On Frida had wanted to distance herself from the "typical ABBA pop sound" (according to Lyngstad herself). She wanted to break away from being associated with the group and make a fresh start both as an artist and as an individual. The new songs, musicians and producer gave Frida a new identity. Collins' production and especially his gated drum sound heard throughout the album, as well as the rough and raw guitar riffs of the lead single "I Know There's Something Going On", contrasted with the sound of an ABBA record. All backing vocals were sung by Frida and Collins. The album closes with their duet "Here We'll Stay".

Swedish Television, SVT, documented the whole recording process from the first day in the studio to the release party after the album's completion. The resulting footage became a one-hour TV-special which included interviews with Frida and Phil Collins, Björn & Benny from ABBA, as well as all the musicians on the album. It was directed by Stuart Orme and executive produced by Phil Collins' manager, Tony Smith. This documentary is included in Frida – The DVD.

== Promotion and reception ==
Professional ratings
Review scores
Source	Rating
AllMusic	4/5 stars
The Rolling Stone Album Guide	3.5/5 stars

In the summer of 1982, Frida unveiled the results of these recording sessions by releasing the single and video "I Know There's Something Going On". An extensive promotion tour of Europe and the United States followed. Frida performed both the single and other songs from the album on major TV-channels throughout Europe.

The album received mixed reviews by critics. In Smash Hits the album was given only a 4 out of 10 rating: "It must have looked a good idea on paper. One pop dynamo — Frida of Abba — produced by another – Phil Collins. The result, however, is less than riveting. Phil has tried to produce an Abba album while Frida is trying to emulate Phil's ghostly singing voice." However, other reviews were more positive. Billboard wrote: "ABBA's auburn-haired songstress makes a bold solo-project a stunning success", whilst Mark Coleman described the album in the third edition of The Rolling Stone Album Guide as a "sharp, rock-oriented, delightfully eclectic album".

Although it was stated that the album has a collection of songs that were designed for a soloist, The Sydney Morning Herald reviewed: "Unfortunately, it still sounds a little like ABBA with three members missing." They added that: "Perhaps the best tracks is the title song which has charted as a single. Others that will help Frida win new fans is a rock-jazz track titled "Tell Me It’s Over" a ballad titled "Threnody" and a Bryan Ferry number "The Way You Do".

Audiences also accepted the new, rockier sound and both the album and its lead single soon started climbing the charts; Something's Going On reached No. 1 in Sweden and was a Top 10 success in several other European countries. It was also a Top 20 hit in the UK, peaking at No. 18. With sales in excess of 1.5 million copies worldwide, Something's Going On is the best-selling solo album of any of the ABBA members to date.

The single "I Know There's Something Going On" reached No. 1 in Belgium and Switzerland, and was a Top 10 hit throughout most of Europe, as well as in Australia and South Africa (peaking at No. 5 in both countries). It also proved a success in the United States, reaching No. 13 on the Billboard Hot 100 chart and No. 9 on Radio & Records airplay, with the track's video being heavily promoted on MTV. The song was the 20th biggest-selling single in the US for 1983.

== Track listing ==
Side one
No.	Title	Writer(s)	Length
1.	"Tell Me It's Over"	Stephen Bishop	2:50
2.	"I See Red"	Jim Rafferty	4:32
3.	"I Got Something"	Tomas Ledin	4:05
4.	"Strangers"	Jayni Bradbury; Dave Morris	4:05
5.	"To Turn the Stone"	Pete Bellotte; Giorgio Moroder	5:25

Side two
No.	Title	Writer(s)	Length
1.	"I Know There's Something Going On"	Russ Ballard	5:25
2.	"Threnody"	Dorothy Parker; Per Gessle	4:16
3.	"Baby Don't You Cry No More"	Rod Argent	3:02
4.	"The Way You Do"	Bryan Ferry	3:35
5.	"You Know What I Mean"	Phil Collins	2:35
6.	"Here We'll Stay" (duet with Phil Collins)	Tony Colton; Jean Roussel	4:05
Total length:			43:55

2005 remaster bonus tracks
No.	Title	Writer(s)	Length
1.	"I Know There's Something Going On" (single edit)	Ballard	4:04
2.	"Here We'll Stay" (solo version)	Colton; Roussel	4:11

== Personnel ==
Adapted from the album's liner notes.

Musicians

- Anni-Frid Lyngstad – lead vocals, backing vocals
- Phil Collins – drums, backing vocals, percussion
- Peter Robinson – keyboards
- Daryl Stuermer – guitars
- Mo Foster – bass guitar
- Phenix Horns:
  - Don Myrick – saxophone
  - Michael Harris – trumpet
  - Rahmlee Michael Davis – trumpet
  - Louis Satterfield – trombone
- The Martyn Ford Orchestra – strings
- Martyn Ford – conductor
- Gavyn Wright – concertmaster
- Skaila Kanga – harp

Production

- Phil Collins – producer
- Hugh Padgham – engineer, assistant producer
- Hans-Gunnar "Paris" Edvinsson – assistant engineer
- Leif Mases – mastering (at Polar Music Studios, Stockholm)
- Peter Robinson – string and horn arrangements
- Stig Anderson – executive producer
- Thomas Johansson – album coordinator
- Yves Poyet – cover illustration
- Anders Hanser – photography
- Dick Nilson – album design

== Charts and certifications ==
=== Charts ===
Chart performance for Something's Going On
Chart (1982–1983)	Peak position
Australian Albums (Kent Music Report)	40
Austrian Albums (Ö3 Austria)	10
Canadian Albums (RPM)	64
Dutch Albums (Album Top 100)	2
German Albums (Offizielle Top 100)	12
Norwegian Albums (VG-lista)	2
Swedish Albums (Sverigetopplistan)	1
UK Albums (Official Charts)	18
US Billboard 200	41

=== Certifications ===
Certifications for Something's Going On
Region	Certification	Certified units/sales
Finland (Musiikkituottajat)	Gold	20,000
United Kingdom (BPI)	Silver	60,000^{^}
^{^} Shipments figures based on certification alone.
