= To Turn the Stone =

1982 single by Frida

- Spanish picture sleeve

Single by Frida

from the album Something's Going On
- B-side: "I Got Something"
- Released: 8 October 1982
- Recorded: February – March 1982
- Studio: Polar, Stockholm, Sweden
- Genre: Pop
- Length: 5:26 (album version); 3:24 (single edit)
- Label: Polar
- Songwriters: Pete Belotte; Giorgio Moroder
- Producer: Phil Collins

Frida singles chronology
"I Know There's Something Going On" (1982)	"To Turn the Stone" (1982)	"I See Red" (1982)

"To Turn the Stone" is a song written by Giorgio Moroder and Pete Bellotte. The song was first recorded by American singer Donna Summer, planned for release on her 1981 studio album I'm a Rainbow; however, it would be shelved until 1996. Swedish singer Anni-Frid Lyngstad would be the first to officially release the song, recording it for her third studio album and first English-language album Something's Going On (1982). Lyngstad's version was produced by Phil Collins, and officially released on 8 October 1982, via Polar Music as the album's second single in select territories.

== Frida cover ==
=== Background ===
While the aim for Frida's first English-language solo album was to include only original compositions, several songs, recorded by other artists were chosen for the album, since those were eligible to include. She felt satisfied covering other artists's songs, as she felt it was not the right time to write her own songs for an album and how she "preferred to reflect other people's ideas." Some songs she covered for the record included "You Know What I Mean" (previously recorded by Phil Collins), "Here We'll Stay" (previously recorded by Sonia Jones), and "To Turn the Stone". It was ABBA manager Stig Anderson who had suggested this song for Frida's album. Frida's version is driven by synths and has an Irish influence. While recording "To Turn the Stone", Phil Collins had set out to achieve the Phil Spector "sound", and therefore bought Spector's albums to perfect an echo sound.

=== Release ===
"To Turn the Stone" was the second single released from Something's Going On after "I Know There's Something Going On" on 8 October 1982. It was released in mainland Europe, excluding Scandinavia, the United Kingdom, Ireland, Australia, and New Zealand. The B-side universally was "I Got Something". In Australia, RCA Victor had plans to release "Tell Me It's Over" as the second single, but Polar Music overruled their decision. In South Africa, Sunshine Records released "I See Red" over "To Turn the Stone". The British single cover had the same artwork as the album, albeit with different text in the top left corner, while everywhere else used the regular artwork. For its single release, the track was edited down to 3:24, cutting out the majority of the instrumental breaks. This single edit has not been included as a bonus track for reissues of Something's Going On, but it was included on the German and Dutch ABBA compilations I Love ABBA (1983) and From ABBA With Love (1984).

=== Critical reception ===
While the parent album as a whole received mainly positive reviews, "To Turn the Stone" was criticized as "weak" and "pale" from music critics, and that the composition was "surprisingly impersonal" by Moroder. American reviewers responded that within the album, the track sounded the most like ABBA. British music critics reacted mixed to the track. David Hepworth for Smash Hits wrote that "maybe this fairly likable folksy-type [song]" would change Frida's unsuccessful career in Britain. Sunie, reviewing for Record Mirror, pejoratively compared "To Turn the Stone" to Watneys, saying it is "as wet and watery [...] and about as alluring."

=== Promotion ===
Frida began promoting the single on first October in the Netherlands on TV shows, Mies and Toppop, where she awaited crowds of people. At this time. Frida did not have a music video for "To Turn the Stone". Jan Bekema and Bert van der Veer, a director from Toppop gave help and recorded the music video in Almere, Netherlands. The video consists of Frida singing in front of a mountain backdrop, cats, barbed wire, dancers, an lightbulb exploding and an eagle.

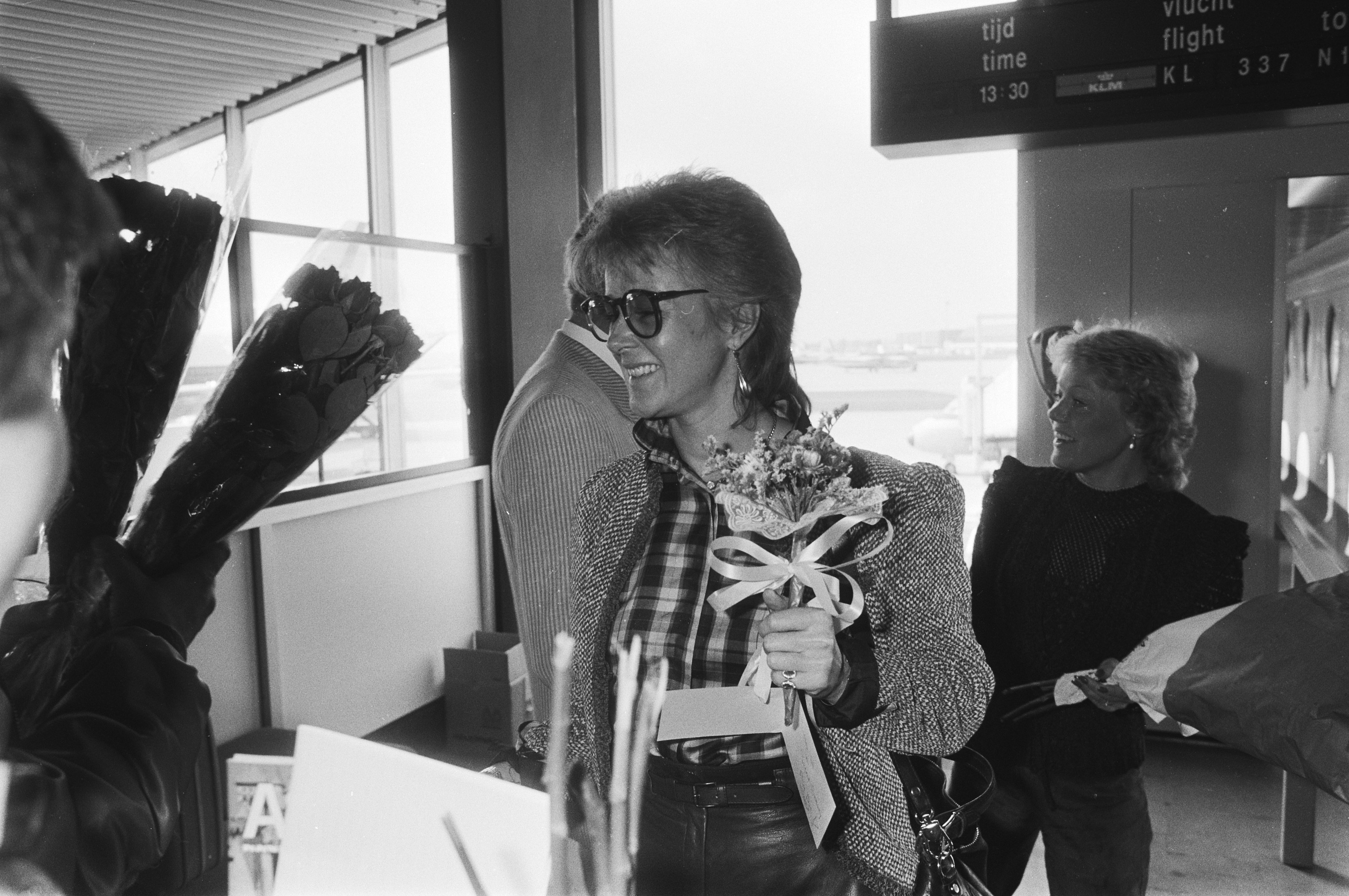
Lyngstad in Amsterdam to promote "To Turn The Stone".

=== Chart reception ===
Compared to "I Know There's Something Going On", "To Turn the Stone" significantly underperformed. The single only reached the top ten on Belgium's Ultratop 50 Singles chart and both the Dutch Single Top 100 and Dutch Top 40, where it became the 99th biggest hit of 1982 on the latter chart. The single also reached the top forty in West Germany. "To Turn the Stone" did not enter the UK singles chart.

=== Weekly charts ===
Weekly chart performance for "To Turn the Stone"
Chart (1982)	Peak position
Belgium (Ultratop 50 Flanders)	8
Netherlands (Dutch Top 40)	6
Netherlands (Single Top 100)	8
West Germany (GfK)	39

=== Year-end charts ===
Year-end performance for "To Turn the Stone"
Chart (1982)	Peak position
Netherlands (Dutch Top 40)	99

== Other versions ==
Around the same time as Frida's single release in late 1982, Helen St. John released her debut album Power to the Piano, produced by Moroder. This consisted of an instrumental version of "To Turn the Stone". This album was released in France and Italy. "To Turn the Stone" was also St. John's debut single, only released in France.

Joe Esposito recorded and released two versions of "To Turn the Stone". The first, produced by Moroder and included on the 1983 album Solitary Men, credited to both of them. "To Turn the Stone" was also the B-side of "Lady, Lady, Lady" from the Flashdance soundtrack in the US and Austria. This single peaked at No. 86 in the Billboard Hot 100 chart, No. 36 on the Adult Contemporary chart, and No. 7 in the Austrian singles chart. The second version was produced by Biff Vincent and Helmuth Schärf in 1989 and was only released as a single in Austria.
