= Monty Python: Almost the Truth (Lawyers Cut) =

- Title card
- Genre: Documentary
- Directed by: Alan G. Parker; Bill Jones; Ben Timlett
- Starring: Graham Chapman; John Cleese; Terry Gilliam; Eric Idle; Terry Jones; Michael Palin
- Country of origin: United Kingdom
- Original language: English
- No. of series: 1
- No. of episodes: 6

Production
- Producers: Margarita Doyle; Bill Jones; Benjamin Timlett; Andrew Winter
- Running time: 360 minutes
- Production companies: Bill and Ben Productions

Original release
- Network: BBC2
- Release: 3 October 2009

Monty Python: Almost the Truth (Lawyers Cut) is a 2009 television documentary series in six parts that covers 40 years of the surreal comedy group Monty Python, from Flying Circus to present day projects such as the musical Spamalot. The series highlights their childhood, schooling and university life, and pre-Python work. The series featured new interviews with surviving members John Cleese, Terry Gilliam, Eric Idle, Terry Jones and Michael Palin, alongside archive interview footage of Graham Chapman and interviews with several associates of the Pythons, including Carol Cleveland, Neil Innes and Chapman's partner David Sherlock, along with commentary from modern comedians.

== Content ==
The documentary is composed of six parts. The first part focuses on the Pythons' lives before Flying Circus and the comic milieu they arose in; the second part covers their coming together and starting Flying Circus; the third part is about the Python records, their personal lives, and the end of Flying Circus; the fourth part looks at their transition to film with And Now for Something Completely Different and Holy Grail, continuing in the fifth part with Life of Brian and the various controversies it caused; and the sixth and final part covers Live at the Hollywood Bowl, The Meaning of Life, Chapman's death, and the five surviving members going on their separate ways and doing other projects.

== Production ==
The series was produced by independent UK film producers Bill and Ben Productions (half of which is Terry Jones' son Bill) in association with Eagle Rock Entertainment and IFC in the US. The idea for the documentary came from Alan G Parker, one of the Directors.

== Featured interviewees ==
The series features interviews with people who worked with Monty Python as well as comedians and performers who cite them as an influence, including:

- Eddie Izzard
- Russell Brand
- Bruce Dickinson
- Dan Aykroyd
- Sanjeev Bhaskar
- Steve Coogan
- Bill Oddie
- Tim Brooke-Taylor
- Julian Doyle
- Carol Cleveland
- Jimmy Fallon
- Seth Green
- Hugh M. Hefner
- Neil Innes
- Simon Pegg
- Nick Mason
- Stephen Merchant
- Tim Roth
- Phill Jupitus
- Ronnie Corbett

== Theme song ==
Each episode opens with a different re-recording of the theme song from Life of Brian, with new lyrics referring to "Python" rather than "Brian". The first five episodes feature original vocalist Sonia Jones who, after becoming increasingly fed up with each subsequent performance, is replaced and on the sixth and final episode by Iron Maiden vocalist Bruce Dickinson.

== Broadcast ==
=== United Kingdom ===
On 29 September 2009, Vue Cinemas in the UK showed a condensed cinema version of the series for one night only. The "BBC Lawyer's Cut", a 59-minute cut, was broadcast on BBC 2 on 3 October 2009. Sky Arts began showing all six chapters of the documentary in January 2012.

=== Canada ===
The full version was broadcast in two one-hour episodes per night on IFC from 19 to 23 October and on Bravo! a few days later. It began broadcasting on The Comedy Network in the same format every Saturday night starting on 13 November 2010. The full cut became available in Region 1 DVD and Blu-ray Disc on 27 October 2009.

=== United States ===
Episodes aired nationally on IFC over six nights in October 2009.

=== Australia ===
A shorter version was shown in two one-hour parts on the Australian Broadcasting Corporation television channel ABC1 on 14 and 21 February 2010.

=== New Zealand ===
The episodes were broadcast on Prime TV during May and early June 2010.

== List of episodes ==
All the episodes have slightly different opening credit sequences, and they bear rather Pythonesque titles:

1. The Not-so-interesting Beginnings
2. The Much Funnier Second Episode – ~~Parrot Sketch~~ – Flying Circus Included
3. And Now, the Sordid Personal Bits
4. The Ultimate Holy Grail Episode
5. Lust for Glory
6. Finally! The Last Episode Ever (For Now...)
