= Oscar Beuselinck =

British media lawyer (1919–1997)

Oscar Albert Beuselinck (10 October 1919 – 27 July 1997) was a British media and defamation lawyer. In his later career, much of his work was for Robert Maxwell and Private Eye.

== Early life ==
Born in Bloomsbury, Beuselinck was the eldest of four children of another Oscar Beuselinck, a Flemish sea cook who was mostly away from home. He was brought up as a church-going Roman Catholic and from the age of twelve worked after school as a "tailor's trotter". On leaving school aged fourteen, he got a job as a messenger with a law firm, where he became an articled clerk. During the Second World War he worked for British Intelligence and was noted as a reader of Tribune. He qualified as a solicitor.

== Career ==
Beuselinck remained with the firm which trained him, which became Wright Webb Syrett, and eventually was its senior partner. He specialized in show business and media work, representing clients who included Sean Connery, Richard Harris, and Mia Farrow. After some fifty years in the firm, in the late 1980s he went to work for Robert Maxwell at Mirror Group Newspapers, after which he joined Davenport Lyons, recruiting the whole litigation team of Wright Webb Syrett. He did much work for Private Eye. An obituary noted that "his greatest strength was an ability to analyse the psychological make-up of his opponents and work on their weak spots".

While acting for John Osborne, Beuselinck wanted to see his play Look Back In Anger turned into a film and became a director of Woodfall Film Productions, which made it. Its other films included The Entertainer (1960) and Tom Jones (1963).

A profile by Kathleen Tynan in 1976 said Beuselinck was "unorthodox, flamboyant, the delight of almost everybody in the world of entertainment".

== Personal life ==
A non-smoker and teetotaller, Beuselinck claimed he had only two vices, one of which was paying alimony. He was married three times, and his children included the actor Paul Nicholas.

He died at the age of 77 while walking on a beach at Folkestone, shortly after finishing the first draft of his autobiography.
