= Here We'll Stay =

1980 song by Sonia Jones

Single by Sonia Jones
- B-side: "Head Over Heels"
- Released: 1980
- Length: 3:19
- Label: Magnet
- Songwriters: Tony Colton; Jean Roussel
- Producer: Tony Colton

Sonia Jones singles chronology
"Brian" (1979)	"Here We'll Stay" (1980)	"Now That It's Morning" (1991)

"Here We'll Stay" is a song written by Tony Colton and Jean Roussel and first recorded by British singer Sonia Jones for the UK pre-selection for the 1980 Eurovision Song Contest. For the 1980 Eurovision Song Contest, the national selection show A Song for Europe was held at the BBC TV Studios in London on 26 March 1980. Twelve songs were in the running to represent the United Kingdom, including "Here We'll Stay". However, the song finished in 11th place with two songs in joint first place: Prima Donna's "Love Enough for Two" and Maggie Moone's "Happy Everything". Prima Donna's song was selected to represent the UK at Eurovision and finished in third place. Sonia Jones's version of "Here We'll Stay" did not enter the UK Singles Chart.

The song was then picked up in 1983 by ABBA member Frida and Phil Collins and recorded as a duet from her album Something's Going On and a solo version was released as the final single from the album.

== Frida version ==
"Here We'll Stay"

Song by Frida and Phil Collins

from the album Something's Going On
- Released: 10 September 1982
- Recorded: 1982
- Studio: Polar Music Studios
- Length: 4:02
- Label: Polar
- Songwriters: Tony Colton; Jean Roussel
- Producer: Phil Collins

"Here We'll Stay"

Single by Frida

from the album Something's Going On
- B-side: "Strangers" "I Got Something" (Canada)
- Released: April 1983
- Recorded: 8–11 March 1983
- Studio: Polar Music Studios
- Length: 4:12
- Label: Polar
- Songwriters: Tony Colton; Jean Roussel
- Producer: Phil Collins

Frida singles chronology
"Tell Me It's Over" (1983)	"Here We'll Stay" (1983)	"Belle" (1983)

Swedish singer Anni-Frid Lyngstad, better known as Frida, recorded a cover of "Here We'll Stay", included on her debut English-language studio album, and third overall, Something's Going On (1982). The track was originally a duet with Frida and producer Phil Collins, which is included in the album as the closing track. An alternate duet mix with missing chorus vocals and an added echo in the verses was mistakenly released on the Swedish cassette tape and the first pressings of the 2005 reissue of the album. The track was released in April 1983 via Polar Music as the album's fourth and final single, re-recorded as a solo version by Frida.

After "I Know There's Something Going On" proved to be a surprise hit in the United States, where it reached number 13 on the Billboard Hot 100, Polar Music had decided to be the follow-up single for the American market. Collins resisted this idea because of his solo career rising, and to also protect his image. With Collins not wanting to be associated with the single, Frida recorded new vocals over two days in March 1983 over a different backing track with added strings and diminished piano parts, as well as a heavier Swedish accent, compared to the album version. The music video was recorded on 25 April 1983, directed by frequent ABBA collaborator Lasse Hallström.

=== Release and reception ===
When the song was released in April 1983, the album's momentum had largely died down, as the last widely released single was "To Turn the Stone" in October 1982. "Here We'll Stay" proved to be a chart failure, failing to enter the top ten or twenty anywhere. In Belgium, the single debuted and peaked at number 36 on the Ultratop 50 chart the week of 14 May 1983; the album's previous two singles both made the top ten of the chart. Similarly in the Netherlands, it peaked at number 34 on the Single Top 100, missing the top ten. Although "Here We'll Stay" proved a commercial failure in the United Kingdom, ranking at number 100 on the UK Singles Chart, it was more successful than "To Turn the Stone", which failed to enter. In the United States, it did not enter the Billboard Hot 100, but did place on the Bubbling Under Hot 100 chart. It debuted at number three on 7 May 1983 and peaked at number two on 14 May 1983; combining with the main Billboard Hot 100, the track charted at number 102.

=== Charts ===
Chart performance for "Here We'll Stay" by Frida
Chart (1983)	Peak position
Belgium (Ultratop 50 Flanders)	36
Netherlands (Single Top 100)	34
UK Singles (OCC)	100
US Bubbling Under Hot 100 Singles (Billboard)	102
