= Take the Plunge =

1989 British TV game show series

- Genre: Game show
- Based on: Blackout by Jay Wolpert
- Presented by: Su Pollard
- Country of origin: United Kingdom
- Original language: English
- No. of series: 1
- No. of episodes: 10

Production
- Producer: Jay Wolpert
- Running time: 30 minutes
- Production companies: Thames Television in association with Jay Wolpert Productions and Action Time

Original release
- Network: ITV
- Release: 4 October – 6 December 1989

Take the Plunge is a British game show based on the American game show Blackout and aired on the ITV from 4 October to 6 December 1989. It was hosted by Su Pollard.
