= Two Up, Two Down =

1979 British TV series

- Starring: Paul Nicholas; Su Pollard; Norman Tipton; Claire Faulconbridge
- Country of origin: United Kingdom
- No. of series: 1
- No. of episodes: 6

Production
- Running time: 30 minutes

Original release
- Network: BBC1
- Release: 11 May – 15 June 1979

Two Up, Two Down is a British sitcom starring Paul Nicholas and Su Pollard. It aired for one series in 1979 and marked the television comedy debut of Su Pollard, later to become well known as Peggy in Hi-de-Hi!. It was written by Janey Preger.

== Cast ==
- Paul Nicholas - Jimmy
- Su Pollard - Flo
- Norman Tipton - Stan
- Claire Faulconbridge - Sheila

== Plot ==
When Stan and Sheila, both fairly strait-laced, move into their new house in Manchester, they discover a pair of hippies, Jimmy and Flo, squatting in their bedroom. As the law will not remove them quickly, they decide to share the house. Stan and Sheila are soon fascinated by Jimmy's and Flo's relaxed lifestyle and philosophy.

== Episodes ==
The series aired for six episodes broadcast on Fridays on BBC One at 8.30pm between 11 May 1979 and 15 June 1979.

No.	Title	Directed by	Original air date
1	What's Yours Is Mine	Roger Cheveley	11 May 1979
Moving into a new house! It's a big event for Stan and Sheila, but Jimmy and Flo are already there - upstairs, in the front bedroom. With Meg Johnson as 1st Woman in precinct, Frances Cox as 2nd Woman in precinct, Lizzie Mickery (credited as Elizabeth Mickery) as Coriander, and Dave Parke as Terry.
2	The Swap	Roger Cheveley	18 May 1979
When Jimmy and Flo suggest a lifeswap, Stan and Sheila nervously agree.
3	Paper Tigers	Roger Cheveley	25 May 1979
When Jimmy's bike is crushed at the golf club he decides to expose corruption in high places! With Ivor Roberts as Councillor Foley, and Philip Jackson as Policeman.
4	Pyramidiocy	Roger Cheveley	1 June 1979
Jimmy and Flo explore the magical powers of the pyramids with spectacular consequences for Stan and Sheila's new freezer.
5	I Know What You're Thinking	Roger Cheveley	8 June 1979
When Hoover, a visitor from America, starts displaying his telepathic powers, Stan decides that he and Sheila should stop being ordinary all the time. With William Hootkins as Hoover.
6	Meadowlarks	Roger Cheveley	15 June 1979
A weekend in the country means one thing for Stan and Sheila, but something quite different for Jimmy and Flo. With Johnny Allan as Farmer Coleclough.

== Theme ==
The theme song, also called "Two Up, Two Down", was written by Dominic Bugatti and Frank Musker. It was sung by Paul Nicholas, and released as a single.

== Reception ==
Hazel Holt, writing in The Stage, said it was "full of high spirits and innocent amusement. Perhaps Miss Preger's comedic view is too gentle and kind, a keener cutting edge might have sharpened the satire which, here, was inclined to collapse into a sort of woolly benevolence. Nevertheless, it is an original theme and has got off to a promising start."

The Daily Mirror called it, "A yawn in the bedroom," and said, "[It] could have been funny, but the script by Janey Preger, was far from that... [The cast] tried very hard to make this trite offering as funny as possible, but it was the great bore of the evening".

In 2013, Su Pollard said, "Shows stand or fall on whether the people who produce them can sell the idea properly or not. They billed it as a 'comedy drama', which was ludicrous".

== Crew ==
- Writer: Janey Preger
- Director: Roger Cheveley
- Producer: Tara Prem
- Costume designer: Gill Hardie
- Set designer: Ian Rawnsley
