= Shine (Frida album) =

Studio album by Frida
- Released: 17 September 1984 (EU); 8 October 1984 (UK)
- Recorded: 1 February – 31 March 1984
- Studio: Studios de la Grande Armée, Paris
- Genre: Pop; soft rock; new wave
- Length: 44:13
- Label: Polar (Scandinavia); Epic (UK); WEA (Canada); Universal (2005 re-release)
- Producer: Steve Lillywhite

Frida chronology
Something's Going On (1982)	Shine (1984)	Djupa andetag (1996)

Singles from Shine
- 1. "Shine" Released: August 1984; 2. "Come to Me (I Am Woman)" Released: October 1984 (EU); 3. "Heart Of The Country" Released: November 1984 (UK); 4. "Twist in The Dark" Released: November 1984 (France)

Shine is the fourth studio album by Swedish singer Anni-Frid Lyngstad, and her second international solo album as Frida. Released on 17 September 1984, it marks her last studio album in the English language to date. Although it was never officially released in the United States, the album was made available in Canada by WEA.

The album has been re-released several times over the years, most notably in a digitally remastered version in 2005, which included bonus tracks. Shine, along with its accompanying promotional videos and clips, is also featured in the collection Frida – 4xCD 1xDVD.

In terms of commercial success, Shine sold a total of 225,000 copies worldwide, with 65,000 of those sales occurring in Sweden. Despite its limited release, the album remains a significant part of Frida's solo discography.

== Recording ==
After the success of Something's Going On, Phil Collins was to produce again for Frida's next album, but as Genesis formed part of his other commitments, producer Steve Lillywhite took over his role.

Recording began on 1 February 1984, at the Studios de la Grande Armée, Paris, France. The producer was Steve Lillywhite, and at only 29 years of age, he was already known for his work with Peter Gabriel, the Rolling Stones and U2 amongst others. Lillywhite's then-wife Kirsty MacColl co-wrote three songs that made the album, as well as a fourth recorded at the sessions and used as a B-side.

At the time of recording, both Something's Going On and Shine, Lyngstad wanted to distance herself from the "typical ABBA pop-sound" and try new directions. Lillywhite managed to give Lyngstad an even more modern and complex soundscape than Phil Collins had done on her previous album. In Frida – The DVD, when speaking about Shine and its failure to recreate the success of its predecessor, Lyngstad herself said "that maybe this album became a bit too modern for its time".

== Music ==
Shine features songwriting contributions from musicians such as Stuart Adamson, Kirsty MacColl, Simon Climie (of Climie Fisher fame), and Pete Glenister, a frequent co-writer and producer of Alison Moyet's music. The Shine album is also unique as it saw the debut of Lyngstad as a songwriter in both "Don't Do It" and "That's Tough", the latter also features her son Hans Fredriksson as co-writer. (Frida also wrote "I Don't Wanna Be Alone" during this period). The track "Slowly" was written by Benny Andersson and Björn Ulvaeus of ABBA.

The lead single from the album was the title track, "Shine". In some countries "Twist in the Dark", "Come to Me (I Am Woman)" and "Heart of the Country" were released as singles. Shine reached the Top 10 on the album charts in Sweden and Norway, and the Top 30 in the Netherlands and Switzerland.

== Critical reception ==
Professional ratings
Review scores
Source	Rating
AllMusic	4/5 stars

The Kingston Whig-Standard reviewed the album in January 1985 and said that what emerged was a "wintery album: beautiful but not warm." They found that the "wistful songs of ABBA" were missed, and considered that "Slowly", written by Björn and Benny, was the best track on the record." They concluded by describing Shine as a "transition album" as it did not "indicate which way Frida [was] heading."

AllMusic's Bruce Eder wrote that Shine was "more ambitious" than Something's Going On. He explained that with producer Steve Lillywhite, Frida was able to stretch out "on a string of memorable and bold songs". Eder also added that Lillywhite gave her a "more integrated band setting in which to work" which, with the "high quality of the songs", delivered a "a more compelling album, if not a more successful one."

== Track listing ==
Side one
No.	Title	Writer(s)	Length
1.	"Shine"	Kevin Jarvis; Guy Fletcher; Jeremy Bird	4:39
2.	"One Little Lie"	Simon Climie; Kirsty MacColl	3:44
3.	"The Face"	Daniel Balavoine; MacColl	3:50
4.	"Twist in the Dark"	Andy Leek	3:43
5.	"Slowly"	Benny Andersson; Björn Ulvaeus	4:34

Side two
No.	Title	Writer(s)	Length
1.	"Heart of the Country"	Stuart Adamson	4:38
2.	"Come to Me (I Am Woman)"	Eddie Howell; David Dundas	5:04
3.	"Chemistry Tonight"	Pete Glenister; Climie; MacColl	4:56
4.	"Don't Do It"	Anni-Frid Lyngstad	4:37
5.	"Comfort Me"	Glenister	4:28
Total length:			44:13

2005 CD reissue bonus tracks
No.	Title	Writer(s)	Length
1.	"That's Tough" (B-side of "Shine")	Lyngstad; Hans Fredriksson; MacColl	5:01
2.	"Shine" (extended mix)	Jarvis; Fletcher; Bird	6:30

== Personnel ==
Adapted from the album's liner notes.

Musicians

- Anni-Frid Lyngstad – lead vocals, backing vocals
- Tony Levin – bass guitar
- Pete Glenister – electric guitar, acoustic guitar
- Simon Climie – keyboards, synthesizers, harpsichord, backing vocals
- Mark Brzezicki – drums
- Marc Chantreau – percussion
- Rutger Gunnarsson – bass guitar (1, 8)
- Kirsty MacColl – backing vocals

Production

- Steve Lillywhite – producer
- Howard Gray – engineer
- Frederic Defaye – assistant engineer
- Stig Anderson – executive producer
- David Edwards – studio coordinator
- Thomas Johansson; Görel Hanser – album coordinators
- Heinz Angermayr – cover photography
- Göran Dessen – album design
- Cay Bond – stylist

== Charts ==
Weekly chart performance for Shine
Chart (1984)	Peak position
Dutch Albums (Album Top 100)	21
European Albums (Eurotipsheet)	34
German Albums (Offizielle Top 100)	49
Norwegian Albums (VG-lista)	10
Swedish Albums (Sverigetopplistan)	6
Swiss Albums (Schweizer Hitparade)	29
UK Albums (OCC)	67
