= Paul Nicholas =

English actor and singer (born 1944)

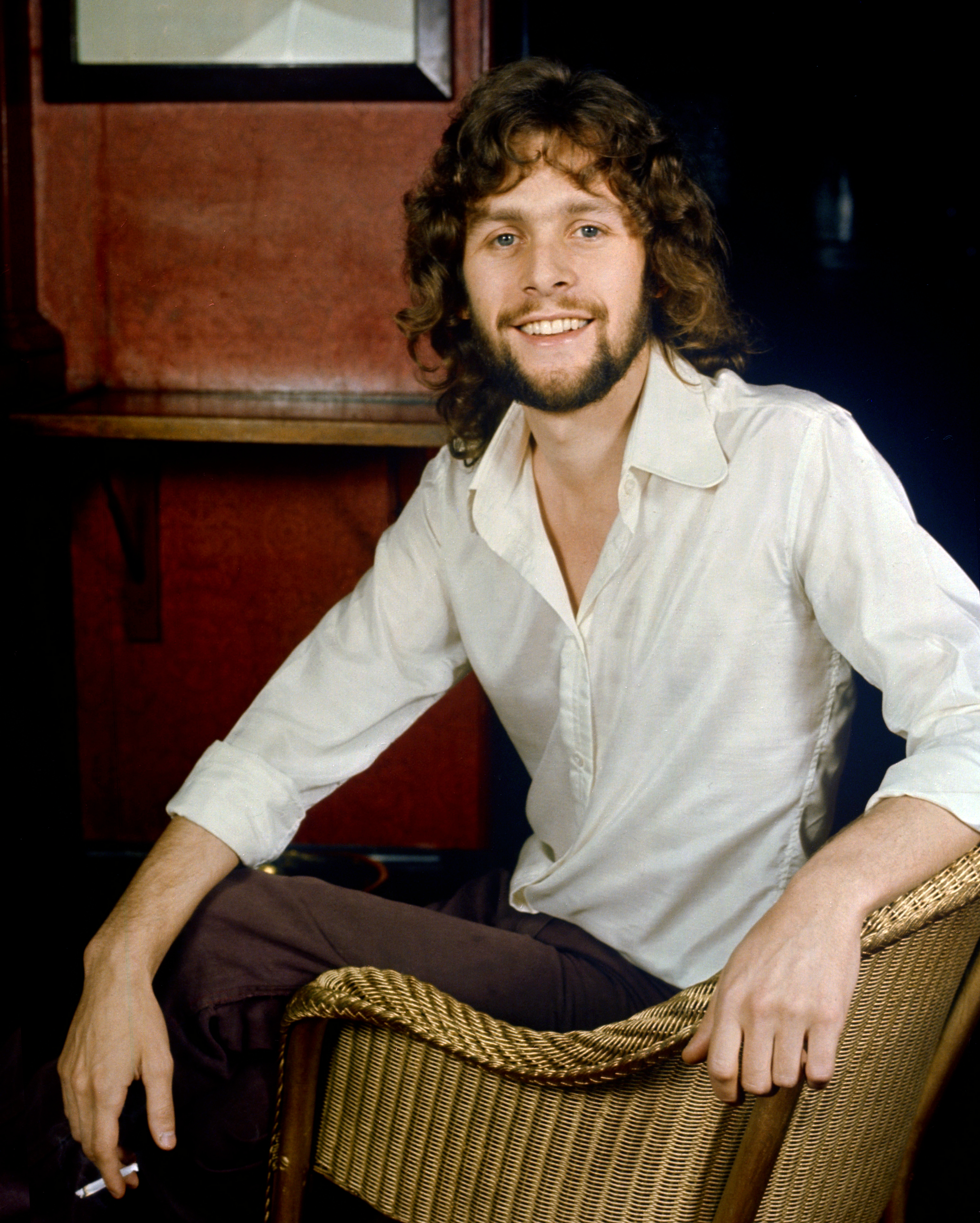
- Nicholas in 1972
- Born: Paul Oscar Beuselinck; 3 December 1944 (age 81); Peterborough, England
- Other names: Paul Dean; Oscar
- Occupations: Actor; director; producer; singer
- Years active: 1960–present
- Musical career
- Genre: Pop
- Instrument: Vocals

Paul Nicholas (born Paul Oscar Beuselinck; 3 December 1944) is an English actor and singer. He is best known for starring as Vince Pinner in the BBC television sitcom Just Good Friends (1983–1986). The show won a BAFTA and Nicholas was nominated for best comedy performance. Nicholas was awarded a Silver Heart by the Variety Club of Great Britain for his services to Entertainment and Charity.

Nicholas started out with a pop career, but soon changed to musical theatre, playing the lead role in Jesus Christ Superstar at the West End's Palace Theatre in 1972. After Just Good Friends ended, he returned to musical theatre and various other entertainment roles, including producing and directing. He is also known for his more recent television role in EastEnders as Gavin Sullivan and appearing in The Real Marigold Hotel.

== Early life ==
Paul Nicholas was born Paul Oscar Beuselinck on 3 December 1944 in Peterborough. His father was an entertainment lawyer, Oscar Beuselinck, whose clients included Sean Connery, the Beatles, Private Eye and MGM. His paternal grandfather, also called Oscar Beuselinck, was Belgian and had been a chef in the merchant navy during the Second World War before becoming head chef on Union-Castle Line ships between the United Kingdom and South Africa. His maternal grandfather was a London docker.

The family spent holidays at his maternal grandparents' home on the Isle of Sheppey, until Nicholas was 10. After his parents divorced when he was 12, his father's family home was at Letchmore Heath, Hertfordshire, opposite the Bhaktivedanta Manor. His paternal grandparents, Winnie and Oscar, lived in a small cottage on the grounds.

== Career ==
Nicholas began his pop career as early as 1960. Adopting the stage name Paul Dean, he formed Paul Dean and the Dreamers who were booked to support the Savages, the backing band for the British rocker Screaming Lord Sutch.

It was here that Sutch first noticed the young Nicholas, who was soon to become vocalist and pianist with the Savages. Still using the name Paul Dean, he released two solo singles in 1965–66. After taking a new stage name, Oscar, he began a long association with the Australian-born entrepreneur, Robert Stigwood. In 1966, Nicholas signed with Stigwood's Reaction Records label and his first single under his new name, "Club of Lights", scraped into the lower reaches of the Radio London Fab Forty chart.

The second Oscar single was a version of a Pete Townshend song "Join My Gang", which the Who never recorded. His third single, a novelty song called "Over the Wall We Go" (1967) is notable for being written and produced by a young David Bowie (Nicholas at this time was managing the band the Sweet and recommended them to record producer Phil Wainman whom he worked with at Mellin Music Publishing). After settling on the stage name Paul Nicholas, he found success in the UK in musicals, beginning with the leading role of Claude in Hair (which Stigwood produced) before winning the title role in the original London production of Jesus Christ Superstar. The part of Danny to Elaine Paige's Sandy made them the first British couple to play the leads in Grease.

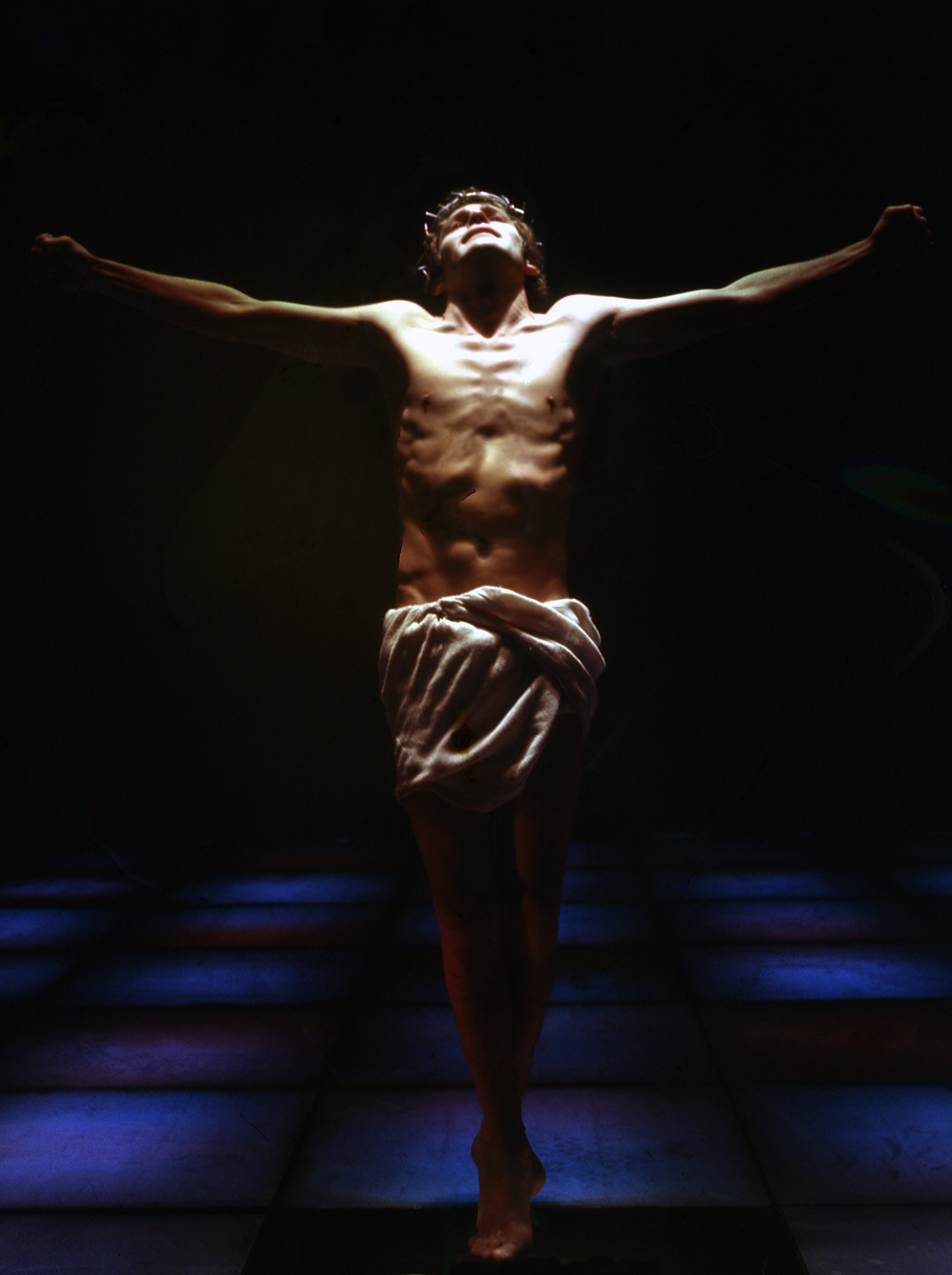
Nicholas in Jesus Christ Superstar, 1972

Nicholas joined The Young Vic under Frank Dunlop and played Claudio in Much Ado About Nothing and appeared in Crete and Sgt. Pepper by John Antrobus. He appeared as the Bully of the Boulevard in Richard O’Brien’s T-Zee at London's Royal Court Theatre. He performed in Prospect Theatre Company's Carl Davies musical Pilgrim. While touring with O'Brien in Hair in 1970 he first heard and recorded two songs with Richard O’Brien from the yet to be produced Rocky Horror Show.

Nicholas's film career began in 1970 in Cannabis. He followed this with See No Evil (1971) and What Became of Jack and Jill? (1972). He then appeared in Stardust (1974), and Three for All (1975). In 1975, he played "Cousin Kevin", Tommy's vicious cousin, in Tommy, and portrayed Richard Wagner in Lisztomania (1975).

In 1976, Nicholas embarked on a short-lived but high-profile pop career, with three Top 20 hits in the UK singles chart "Reggae Like It Used To Be", "Dancing with the Captain", and "Grandma's Party", the last two of which reached the Top 10. He released the single "Heaven On The 7th Floor" in 1977. This only just reached the UK Top 40, but reached number No. 1 in New Zealand. In the US, the song peaked at No. 6 on the Billboard Hot 100 and number 5 in Cashbox listings, giving Nicholas a gold record. He followed this with "On The Strip" which entered the Billboard Hot 100 No. 67 but failed to enter the UK chart. In the mid-1970s he hosted his own children's television pop show, Paul.

In 1978, Nicholas appeared in Sgt. Pepper's Lonely Hearts Club Band as Dougie Shears. Further films followed including The World Is Full of Married Men (1979), Yesterday's Hero (1979), the loutish punk singer in The Jazz Singer (1980), the romantic lead in Invitation to the Wedding (1983), and Nutcracker (1983).

In 1979, he starred in Two Up, Two Down, a short-lived sitcom co-starring Su Pollard. Having participated in a workshop with Andrew Lloyd Webber, Nicholas returned to West End theatre in 1981 to create the role of Rum Tum Tugger in Lloyd Webber's musical Cats. He then originated the title role in Blondel by Tim Rice and Stephen Oliver. In 1983, he got his first high-profile television role as Vince Pinner in John Sullivan's BBC Television sitcom Just Good Friends. The show was a success, running for three series and ending at Christmas 1986, with Nicholas also singing the theme song. The show won a BAFTA and Nicholas was nominated for best comedy performance. He followed this by starring in two series of the comedy-drama series Bust for London Weekend Television.

Nicholas continued to play numerous roles on screen in both movie and television projects. In 1986, Nicholas starred in musicals including Jekyll and Hyde, Fiddler on the Roof’' and 42nd Street’' which was directed by the shows author Mark Bramble. He starred as The Pirate King in Joseph Papp's version of The Pirates of Penzance at the London Palladium and the Manchester Opera House, touring again in the same role in the late 1990s. He starred in Barnum in the first national tour and followed this with a highly successful season at The Dominion Theatre in the West End. At the end of 1991, while touring with Barnum, Nicholas was the subject of This Is Your Life.

For his services to show business and charity, Nicholas was awarded a Silver Heart from the Variety Club of Great Britain and a Gold Badge Award from BASCA for his services to the music industry. Nicholas then starred in the national tour of Singin' in the Rain, which was directed by Tommy Steele.

In June 1996, Nicholas played the role of King Arthur in the Covent Garden Festival's production of Camelot. He repeated his role of King Arthur in a BBC Radio 2 production of Camelot. Other radio work included Bert in BBC Radio 4's Gracie. He hosted two series of BBC Radio 2's Mad About Musical', as well as his own hour-long TV special, Paul and Friends, for Thames Television. Nicholas fronted the Radio 4 children's series Cat's Whiskers during the 1980s.

In 1997, Nicholas starred as the anti-hero of Karoline Leach's The Mysterious Mr. Love at the Comedy Theatre in London's West End. He continued to appear as the lead in numerous straight roles thereafter: Simon Gray's Stagestruck, a national tour of Michael Cooney's The Dark Side, Catch Me if You Can, and two plays by Eric Chappell: Mixed Feelings, in which he played a transsexual, and Snakes and Ladders. He starred as John Smith in the original production of Caught in the Net. In 1998, he co-produced, with Bill Kenwright, a new musical based on Charles Dickens' novel A Tale of Two Cities, starring as Sidney Carton. The musical played Windsor with a Christmas season in Birmingham.

In 2000, Nicholas appeared in the BBC television comedy drama Sunburn, playing David Janus, owner of the self-titled holiday company around which the series was created. He then played Ronnie Buchan in the new police drama series Burnside. Further television work included parts in The Bill and Holby City.

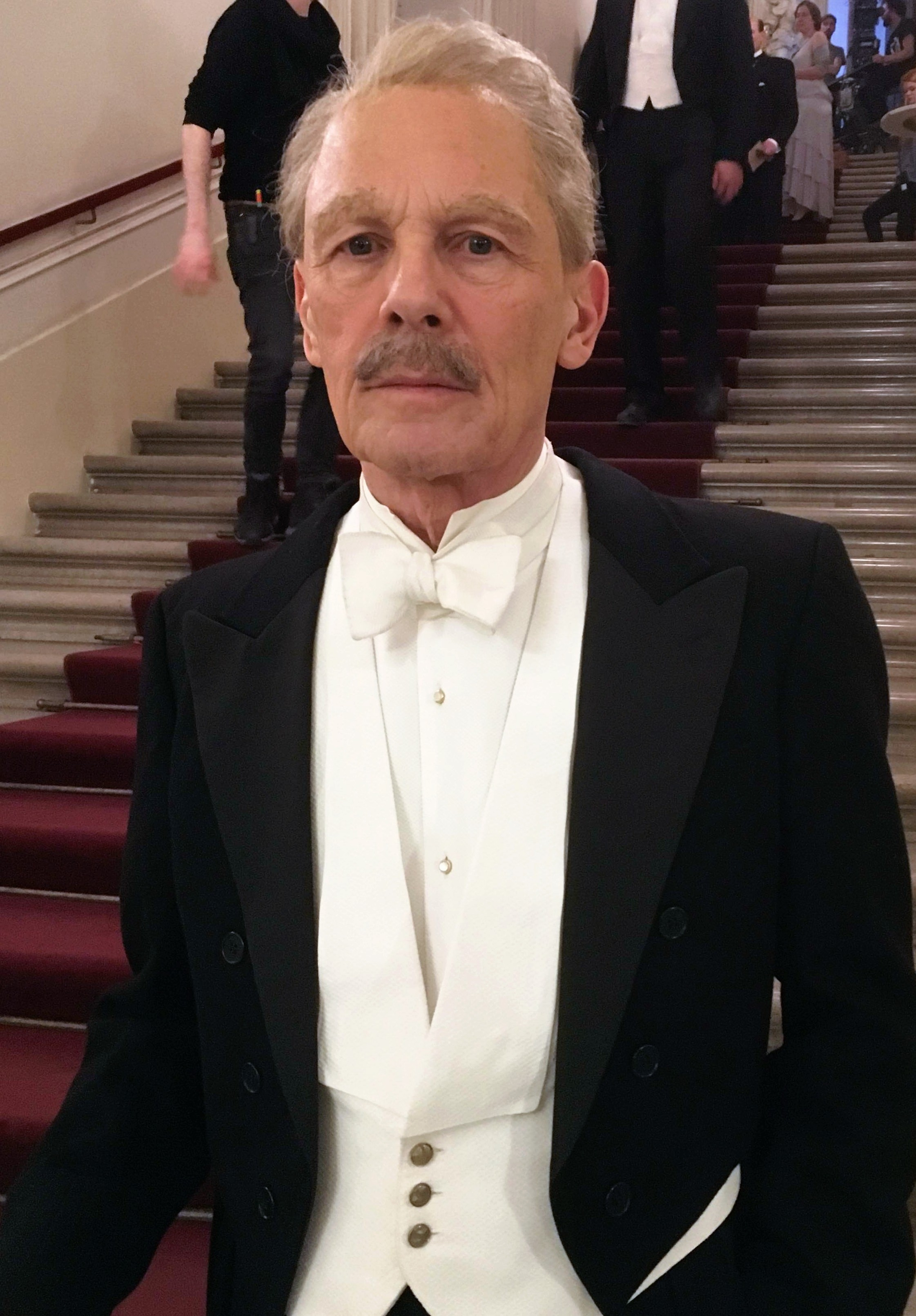
Nicholas as Neville Chamberlain in Masaryk (2016)

Nicholas then played the title role in the national tour of Doctor Dolittle and followed this with the role of Tevye in UK Productions' national tour of Fiddler on the Roof. In the summer of 2006, he was a celebrity showjumper in the BBC's Sport Relief event Only Fools on Horses, as well as appearing in Doctors, Heartbeat and Holby City. That autumn, Nicholas was attached to star in the British film Cash and Curry, and that year he co-produced and starred in Jekyll & Hyde in a UK national tour.

In 2008, Nicholas played Alan Boon in BBC Four's Consuming Passion: 100 Years of Mills & Boon. He also directed and produced A Tale of Two Cities at Upstairs at the Gatehouse. In 2009, Nicholas played Jack Point in The Yeomen of the Guard for the Carl Rosa Opera Company at the Tower of London Festival. In November 2010, Nicholas opened in The Haunting. He also directed the musical version of Tale of Two Cities at Charing Cross Theatre in April–May 2012.

In 2014, Nicholas produced and starred in Blockbuster, a musical. In 2015, he appeared as Judge Wargrave in And Then There Were None. In the summer of 2015 he directed a new production of Tommy at Blackpool's Opera House. In June 2015 while touring in And Then There Were None, Nicholas was cast as Gavin Sullivan on EastEnders. He then starred as Ebeneezer Scrooge in the Alan Menken musical, A Christmas Carol. In 2016, he was cast as Neville Chamberlain in the film Masaryk. He appeared as himself in The Real Marigold Hotel shown on BBC One in March 2017. In 2018, Nicholas toured the UK. He also played Arvide Abernathy in Guys and Dolls at the Royal Albert Hall.

In 2021, Nicholas published 'Musicals Marigolds & Me' and his 3 CD Boxset 'Paul Nicholas Gold'.

In 2023, Nicholas resumed a UK tour of 'The Best Exotic Marigold Hotel' prior to a West End run. He also released an audio book of his biography 'Musicals Marigolds & Me'.

In 2024/25 Nicholas appeared as the Major at the Apollo Theatre in London in John Cleese's Fawlty Towers: The Play. ‘Casualty’ BBC 2026

Business

In 1990, while starring with David Ian in The Pirates of Penzance at the London Palladium, Nicholas offered Ian a partnership in co-producing and starring in a touring production of the New York Shakespeare Festival version of the popular Gilbert and Sullivan opera. Paul Nicholas & David Ian Associates Ltd was formed to produce the 20th anniversary production of Jesus Christ Superstar on a UK-wide tour, which sold out. They then produced a nightly fully staged version of The Pirates of Penzance in which Nicholas starred and again they sold out.

The company has since produced numerous shows, including:

- Jesus Christ Superstar – concert version
- Pirates of Penzance – UK tour
- Grease – West End and Broadway – Tony Award nomination for Best Revival 2008
- The Rocky Horror Show – director
- Ain't Misbehavin' – West End
- Singin' in the Rain – UK tour
- Evita – UK tour
- Chess – UK tour
- Happy Days – UK tour
- Saturday Night Fever – London Palladium and NYC Minskoff Theatre, co-adapter and producer
- A Tale of Two Cities – UK tour; co-produced with Bill Kenwright
- Jekyll & Hyde – UK tour, co-produced with UK Productions
- Keeler – 2007, producer and director
- A Tale of Two Cities – Upstairs at The Gatehouse 2008, producer and director
- Grease – West End 2007 and US tour 2008–09, co-producer
- Jest End (musical parody) – London Players and Jermyn Theatres 2009, producer
- Grease – South Africa and Far East tour 2010, US and UK tours 2010/11, co-producer
- Keeler – UK tour September–November 2011, producer and director
- A Tale of Two Cities: The Musical – Charing Cross Theatre April–May 2012, director
- Seven Brides for Seven Brothers – UK tour September 2013, producer
- Wag – Charing Cross Theatre July 2013, co-producer
- Keeler – October 2013 producer and director
- Blockbuster – UK tour September 2014 producer and director
- A Christmas Carol – 2015 associate producer
- Grease – UK tour 2017, co-producer
- Tommy – Blackpool Opera House, 2018 Director

== Paul Nicholas School of Acting and Performing Arts ==
In 2006, Nicholas set up a franchise operation, the Paul Nicholas School of Acting & Performing Arts, aimed at teaching acting to school-age children. The company went into liquidation in 2012.

In January 2008, Nicholas launched Paul Nicholas Community Arts, a project designed to engage disenfranchised children in the arts. The pilot scheme was funded for fourteen weeks by Wyre Borough Council. A twelve-week scheme began on 28 May 2008 in Blackpool.

== Filmography ==
Year	Title	Role	Notes
1970	Cannabis	Paul	
1970	The Females	Mann	Uncredited
1971	See No Evil	Jacko	
1972	What Became of Jack and Jill?	Johnnie Tallent	
1974	Stardust	Johnny	
1975	Listzomania	Richard Wagner	
1975	Three for All	Gary	
1975	Tommy	Cousin Kevin	
1978	Sgt. Pepper's Lonely Hearts Club Band	Dougie Shears	
1979	The World is Full of Married Men	Gem Gemini	
1979	Yesterday's Hero	Clint	
1980	Ladykillers	Frank Hogg	
1980	The Jazz Singer	Keith Lennox	
1982	Alicja	Cheshire Cat/ Caterpillar	
1982	Nutcracker	Mike McCann	
1983	Invitation to the Wedding	David Anderson	
1985	Lyrics by Tim Rice	Blondel	Segment: "Least of My Troubles" (Video)
1987	Even Break	Butch	Short
2006	Everything But the Kitchen Sink	Dr. Heinrich Vandoor (voice)	Short
2013	Dear World: A Musical Fable	Sewerman	Video
2016	A Prominent Patient	Neville Chamberlain	
2016	The Gridiron	Mr. Stayner	

== Television ==
Year	Title	Role	Notes
1970	The Wednesday Play	Jake	Episode: "Season of the Witch"
1972	Till Death Us Do Part	Self	Christmas Special
1974	Softly, Softly: Taskforce	Slim	Episode: "Pop Goes the Weasel"
1976	Play for Today	Kevin	Episode: "Early Troubles"
1979	Two Up, Two Down	Jimmy	
1980	CHiPs	Malcolm	Episode: "Thrill Show"
1981	Plays for Pleasure	Sam	Episode: "A Little Roccoco"
1983	Doubting Thomas		TV movie
1983–6	Just Good Friends	Vince Pinner	
1987–8	Bust	Neil Walsh	
1987–8	Creepy Crawlies	Narrator	
1987–93	The Adventures of Spot	Narrator	
1989–90	Close to Home	James Shepherd	
1995	Spot's Magical Christmas	Sam	
1999	Calling All Toddlers	Narrator	Segment: "Spot Stays Overnight"
2000	Burnside	Ronnie Buchan	4 episodes
2000	Sunburn	David Janus	6 episodes
2000–2012	Doctors	Various	3 episodes
2003	The Bill	Julian Walker	Episode: "Blaze of Glory"
2006	Heartbeat	Sven Larson	Episode: "Dead Men Do Tell Tales"
2006	Holby City	Rob Logan	Episode: "Flight of the Bumblebee"
2008	Consuming Passion: 100 Years of Mills & Boon	Alan Boon	TV movie
2008	The Royal Today	Mr. Woods	48 episodes
2010	Missing	Eddie Broad	Episode: "The Old Romantic"
2015–16	EastEnders	Gavin Sullivan	31 episodes

== Personal life ==
In 1963, when Nicholas was 18, he had a child with his then girlfriend Patricia Brecknell.

In early 1967, Lyn Last, his then-former girlfriend, gave birth to his second child. This was only a few months after his 1966 marriage to Susan Gee.

Nicholas and Gee had two children together; they later divorced, in 1970.

Nicholas moved to Highgate, London in the 1970s. Nicholas resides there with his second wife Linzi Jennings, whom he married in 1984. The couple have two children together.

== Discography ==
=== Albums ===
Appearances:

- Hair (Original London Cast Recording) (1968, Polydor Records)
- Fresh Hair (Original London Cast Recording) (1970, Polydor)
- Cats (Original London Cast Recording) (1981, Polydor)
- Sgt. Pepper's Lonely Hearts Club Band (soundtrack) (1978, RSO Records)

Solo:

- Paul Nicholas (1977, RSO LP) 12 songs; 10 in the US and Canada. In the Netherlands, it was retitled On the Strip (1978, RSO LP) and added two single A-sides while dropping two others.
- Just Good Friends (1986, K-Tel LP and CD) 13 songs, 12 of which are cover versions
- That's Entertainment (1993, Karussell CD) 14-song compilation; RSO/Polydor material from 1976 to 1980
- Colours of My Life (1994, First Night Records CD) 16-song compilation; 12 from West End theatre cast albums and 4 new recordings
- Paul Nicholas Gold (2022 Demon Records) 3 CD set CD1 Pop Hits – CD2 Show Songs – CD3 Romantic Songs

=== Singles ===
Year	Title	Peak positions					
Year	Title	UK	AUS	IRE	US	CAN	NZ
1968	"Open Up the Skies" (Polydor)	—	—	—	—	—	—
1969	"Who Can I Turn to" (Polydor)	—	—	—	—	—	—
1970	"Freedom City" (Polydor)	—	—	—	—	—	—
1971	"The World is Beautiful" (Polydor)	—	—	—	—	—	—
1974	"I Hit the Jackpot" (Epic)	—	—	—	—	—	—
1974	"D.J.: Saturday Night" (Epic)	—	—	—	—	—	—
1975	"Shufflin' Shoes" (RSO)	—	—	—	—	—	—
1976	"Reggae Like It Used to Be" (RSO)	17	—	—	—	—	—
1976	"Dancing with the Captain" (RSO)	8	99	5	—	—	—
1976	"Grandma's Party" (RSO)	9	—	—	—	—	—
1977	"If You Were the Only Girl in the World" (RSO)	—	—	—	—	—	—
1977	"Heaven on the 7th Floor" (RSO)	40	41	—	6	49	1
1978	"On the Strip" (RSO)	—	—	—	67	—	—
1978	"Love Lines" (RSO, Netherlands-only)	—	—	—	—	—	—
1979	"Two Up Two Down" (RSO)	—	—	—	—	—	—
1979	"Yesterday's Hero" (RSO)	—	—	—	—	—	—
1980	"Magical Mr. Mistoffelees" (Polydor)	—	—	—	—	—	—
1981	"No News" (RSO)	—	—	—	—	—	—
1983	"House of Rock" (The Flying Record Company)	—	—	—	—	—	—
1983	"The Least of My Troubles" with Sharon Lee-Hill (MCA Records)	—	—	—	—	—	—
1984	"Just Good Friends" (The Flying Record Company)	—	—	—	—	—	—
1986	"Don't Wanna Go Home Alone" (K-Tel)	—	—	—	—	—	—

== Literature ==
- Paul Nicholas (with Douglas Thompson) "Musicals, Marigolds & Me" autobiography, 235 pages. Published in October 2021 by Fantom Publishing. An Audio Book version published in 2023 narrated by Nicholas.
- Paul Nicholas (with Douglas Thompson): Behind the Smile autobiography, hardcover, 218 pages published in October 1999 by André Deutsch Ltd; ISBN 0-233-99748-2

== See also ==
- List of one-hit wonders in the United States
