= Jeans On =

Single by David Dundas

from the album David Dundas
- B-side: "Sleepy Serena"
- Released: October 1976
- Genre: Pop
- Length: 3:20 (album)
- Label: Chrysalis
- Songwriters: David Dundas, Roger Greenaway
- Producer: Roger Greenaway

David Dundas singles chronology
"Jeans On" (1976)	"Another Funny Honeymoon" (1977)

"Jeans On" is a song by British musician David Dundas from his 1977 self-titled debut album. Released as a single the previous year, it was first featured as a television advertising jingle in the United Kingdom for Brutus Jeans and subsequently in a television advertising jingle in 2024 for Wrangler Jeans in the United States.

The popularity of the original commercial eventually led to the recording of "Jeans On" as a full-length song, with some lyrical changes.

The single eventually became Dundas's biggest hit, peaking at number 3 on the UK Singles Chart and number 17 on the U.S. Billboard Hot 100. It became a chart hit all over Western and Northern Europe, including a number 1 in West Germany.

Dundas also recorded a French language version of the song, titled "Blue Jeans".

The opening electric piano riff of the song was looped and sampled for British electronic musician Fatboy Slim's 1998 track "Sho Nuff"; as a result, Dundas is credited as a co-writer on the track.

The song is covered by Keith Urban in the 2002 album Golden Road.

== Charts ==
=== Weekly charts ===
Chart (1976–1977)	Peak position
Australia (Kent Music Report)	3
Austrian Singles Chart	3
Belgium (Flanders)	15
Canada RPM Adult Contemporary	31
Canada RPM Top Singles	13
German Singles Chart	1
Irish Singles Chart	3
Netherlands	15
New Zealand (Listener)	14
South African Singles Chart	3
Swedish Singles Chart	15
Swiss Singles Chart	3
UK Singles Chart	3
U.S. Billboard Hot 100	17
U.S. Billboard Adult Contemporary	37

=== Year-end charts ===
Chart (1976)	Peak position
Australia (Kent Music Report)	20

== See also ==
- List of 1970s one-hit wonders in the United States
