= Come to Me (I Am Woman) =

Single by Frida and Su Pollard

Single by Frida

from the album Shine
- A-side: "Twist in the Dark (France only)"
- B-side: "Slowly"
- Released: 26 November 1984
- Recorded: February – March 1984
- Length: 5:04 4:24 (German 7" Edit)
- Label: Polar, Polydor, Sunshine
- Songwriters: Eddie Howell, David Dundas
- Producer: Steve Lillywhite

Frida singles chronology
"Shine" (1984)	"Come to Me (I Am Woman)" (1984)	"Heart of the Country" (1984)

"Come to Me (I Am Woman)" is a 1984 song by ABBA singer Anni-Frid Lyngstad, known professionally as Frida. The song was a single in selected countries from her second English-language solo album Shine.

"Come to Me (I Am Woman)" was written by Eddie Howell and David Dundas and selected by Frida and producer Steve Lillywhite before the recording sessions for the album had commenced in Studio de la Grand Armée, Paris as a ballad.

== Release ==
"Come to Me (I Am Woman)" was chosen as the follow-up single to "Shine" in November 1984 in Sweden, Germany, the Netherlands and South Africa, with "Slowly" as the B-side, a song written by ABBA members, Björn Ulvaeus and Benny Andersson. The German pressing had a shorter mix of 4:24. The song was performed live on several occasions, on the Swedish show Razzel as well as Na Sowas-Extra in Germany. Additionally, "Come to Me (I Am Woman)" was the B-side of "Twist in the Dark", released in France. Despite promotional efforts and German newspapers recommending the song as a hit, by the time of release there was a decrease in Frida's popularity, and due to a lack of effective planning and collaboration by Polar Music with other record companies, the single did not chart in the countries released.

== Su Pollard version ==
"Come to Me (I Am Woman)"

Single by Su Pollard

from the album Su
- B-side: "You Don't Really Want Me"
- Released: September 1985
- Label: Rainbow
- Songwriters: Eddie Howell, David Dundas
- Producers: Keith Hopwood, Pete Bush, Bill Kimber

Su Pollard singles chronology
"Come to Me (I Am Woman)" (1985)	"Starting Together" (1986)

"Come to Me (I Am Woman)"

Single by Su Pollard

from the album Su
- B-side: "You Don't Really Want Me"
- Released: March 1987
- Label: Rainbow
- Songwriters: Eddie Howell, David Dundas
- Producers: Keith Hopwood, Pete Bush, Bill Kimber

Su Pollard singles chronology
"Wives Will Always Be the Last to Know" (1986)	"Come to Me (I Am Woman)" (1987)	"My Miracle" (1990)

English actress Su Pollard released a cover of "Come to Me (I Am Woman)" as her debut single in September 1985. Prior to this, Pollard had taken up singing lessons at the age of 19 and made her debut television appearance in 1973 on talent show Opportunity Knocks singing a comic song, before landing a role on sitcom Hi-de-Hi!, which began broadcasting in January 1980. In order to pursue her music career further, Pollard in her own words "deliberately chose a serious song because anything else would be laughed off". The single received some positive reception. The Bristol Evening Post reviewed the song, saying: "It's good and it's commercial. If there is a criticism it's that her voice could have handled something with more substance to it." "She may not be the next Annie Lennox, or Dusty Springfield but even professional critics will be hard-pressed to laugh off the song as the indulgence of a comedy actress". Additional feedback from the Sunday Sun stated: "I hope it gets to the no.1 spot she simply deserves for spreading sparkle in an otherwise grey-tinted world". The single was promoted on TV shows such as Pebble Mill and it peaked at No. 71 in the UK singles chart. The song charted below the top 100 on two other occasions. "Come to Me (I Am Woman)" was included as the closing track on Pollard's 1986 album, Su.

=== Charts ===
Chart performance for "Come to Me (I Am Woman)" by Su Pollard
Year	Chart	Peak position
1985	UK singles chart	71
1986	UK singles chart	166
1987	UK singles chart	139
