= Magical Ring =

Studio album by Clannad
- Released: 21 March 1983
- Recorded: Nova Studios, London, UK; Windmill Lane, Dublin, Ireland
- Genre: Folk
- Length: 35:57
- Label: RCA
- Producer: Richard Dodd

Clannad chronology
Fuaim (1982)	Magical Ring (1983)	Legend (1984)

Professional ratings
Review scores
Source	Rating
AllMusic	3.5/5 stars

Magical Ring is the seventh album by Irish folk group Clannad, released in 1983. It contains the band's biggest hit single, "Theme from Harry's Game", which reached number 5 on the UK Singles Chart and number 2 on the Irish Singles Chart. Also included are two further singles: "I See Red", which reached number 81 in the UK and number 19 in Ireland, and "Newgrange", which reached number 65 in the UK and number 30 in Ireland.

== Track listing ==
No.	Title	Writer(s)	Length
1.	"Theme from Harry's Game"	Pól Brennan; Ciarán Brennan	2:30
2.	"Tower Hill"	P. Brennan	3:51
3.	"Seachrán Charn tSiail"	Traditional	2:20
4.	"Passing Time"	P. Brennan; C. Brennan	3:44
5.	"Coinleach Ghlas an Fhómhair"	Traditional	5:57
6.	"I See Red"	Jim Rafferty	4:23
7.	"Tá 'mé Mo Shuí"	Traditional	3:13
8.	"Newgrange"	C. Brennan	4:03
9.	"The Fairy Queen"	Traditional	2:40
10.	"Thíos Fá'n Chósta"	P. Brennan; C. Brennan; Pádraig Duggan	3:16

2003 Deluxe Edition bonus track
No.	Title	Length
11.	"Coinleach Glas an Fhómhair" (Cantoma Mix)	6:22

== Personnel ==
Clannad

- Ciarán Ó Braonáin – bass, guitar, keyboards, vocals
- Máire Ní Bhraonáin – vocals, harp
- Pól Ó Braonáin – flute, guitar, percussion, vocals
- Noel Ó Dúgáin – guitar, vocals
- Pádraig Ó Dúgáin – guitar, vocals

Additional musicians

- Ed Deane – electric guitar
- James Delaney – synthesizers, keyboards
- Alan Dunn – accordion
- Charlie Morgan – drums
- Pádraig O'Donnell – vocals
- Frank Ricotti – percussion

Production

- Richard Dodd – engineer, producer
- Austin Ince – engineer
- Gered Mankowitz – photography
- Rob O'Connor – design

== Charts ==
Chart performance for Magical Ring
Chart (1983)	Peak position
Dutch Albums (Album Top 100)	20
UK Albums (Official Charts)	26
