= Brutus Jeans =

British clothing company

Brutus Jeans is a British clothing company founded in 1966 by brothers Keith and Alan Freedman, who were 18 and 17 years old at the time, respectively.

The company started with one style of sweater and kept adding to the range, which eventually included shirts and jeans (for both men and women). The brand was very popular in the 1960s and 1970s with skinheads, Mods and the football crowds. They won awards for their TV advertising, and one of their TV jingles, with minor changes, became the hit song "Jeans On" (performed in both cases by David Dundas). Adrian Lyne, who later achieved major success in films, made television commercials for the company in the 1970s.

In 1966 they created the Trimfit shirt. The Trimfit had a cult following was documented in numerous books and articles about British fashion. Throughout the late sixties and mid seventies this shirt sold in the millions. An original Trimfit shirt can be found in the Museum of London. It was revived in 2009.
