= I See Red (Jim Rafferty song) =

1982 song

Single by Frida

from the album Something's Going On
- B-side: "I Got Something"
- Released: December 1982
- Recorded: Polar, Stockholm, Sweden
- Length: 4:32
- Label: Sunshine; Polar
- Songwriter: Jim Rafferty
- Producer: Phil Collins

Frida singles chronology
"To Turn the Stone" (1982)	"I See Red" (1982)	"Tell Me It's Over" (1983)

"I See Red" is a song written by Jim Rafferty, the brother of Scottish singer-songwriter Gerry Rafferty. It was initially recorded by Swedish singer and ABBA member Anni-Frid Lyngstad, better known as Frida. Frida's recording was included on her debut English-language album and third studio album overall Something's Going On (1982). The song was produced by Phil Collins. It was released as the album's third single in December 1982 exclusively in South Africa, released through Sunshine Records.

The single did not do well, failing to enter the main South African single chart, Springbok Radio. However, it would gain minor success, when it was recorded by Irish folk group Clannad, where it became a top 100 UK hit. Gerry Rafferty himself would also cover it on his 1992 album On a Wing and a Prayer.

== Frida version ==
Frida's recording was selected as the album's second single in South Africa, and third overall, in December 1982; "To Turn the Stone" was not released in the country. The single was coupled with "I Got Something", penned by Tomas Ledin. It performed poorly, not entering the main South African single chart at the time, Springbok Radio. On the airplay-only 702 Radio Top 20 chart however, it reached number 15 there.

=== Music video ===
Alongside with "I Know There's Something Going On", "To Turn The Stone" and "Here We'll Stay", "I See Red" had a music video directed to promote her album Something's Going On. The promotional video features Lyngstad lip-syncing to a montage between pinball machines, a group of acrobats dancing, and balls in a contemporary-styled stage. Stuart Orme directed the music video for Lyngstad's version.

=== Track listing ===
7-inch single

1. "I See Red" – 4:32
2. "I Got Something" – 4:05

== Clannad version ==
"I See Red"

Single by Clannad

from the album Magical Ring
- B-side: "Tá Mé 'Mo Shuí"
- Released: February 1983
- Recorded: Windmill Studios, Dublin, Ireland
- Genre: New-age
- Length: 3:25
- Label: RCA
- Songwriter: Jim Rafferty
- Producer: Richard Dodd

Clannad singles chronology
"Theme from Harry's Game" (1982)	"I See Red" (1983)	"Newgrange" (1983)

In February 1983, Clannad released the song as a single which later appeared on their album Magical Ring. Clannad's version charted at No. 81 in the UK Charts.

== Other cover versions ==
In 1983 the song was covered by Estonian singer Velly Joonas under the title "Stopp, seisku aeg!" ("Stop! Stall the Time!"). It was not until it was released in 2015 as a single, gaining a surprise global cult popularity.

In 1992, Gerry Rafferty covered "I See Red" for his album, On a Wing and a Prayer.
