= Davenport Lyons =

London-based

- Headquarters: London
- No. of offices: 1
- No. of attorneys: 16 associates, 41 partners (in early 2008)
- Major practice areas: Corporate, Dispute resolution, Property
- Date founded: 2001 incorporated;
- Company type: partnership
- Website: www.davenportlyons.com

Davenport Lyons was a London-based law firm that entered into administration on 25 April 2014. Although most of their work concerned corporate acquisitions, in 2007 their actions against file sharers became news in the United Kingdom. This subject became widely publicised in late 2008 because of the number of innocent people receiving letters from the firm, it was reported on Watchdog that Atari stopped using this firm for this reason.

They were incorporated in 2001 and in 2008 listed 16 associates and 41 partners. Prior to their entry into file-sharing related intellectual property litigation, they were best known for their involvement in the case of a London tailor near Savile Row.

== Notable case ==
Robin Shaw, a partner in the firm, was named Lawyer of the Week by The Times in September for having acted for HarperCollins in the case brought by the BBC to prevent the publication of the autobiography of Ben Collins, the mystery driver known as the Stig in Top Gear, the BBC TV series. The High Court refused to grant the injunction and the book, The Man in the White Suit, has now been published.

== Complaints and investigations ==
Davenport Lyons had been accused of trying to extort money from people for alleged copyright infringement. The law firm had accused up to 25,000 people of downloading material such as computer games, music and even pornography that the computer users allegedly know nothing about. This has led to a barrage of complaints against the law firm and investigations by organisations such as Which?.

=== Solicitors Regulation Authority ===
In 2008 an official complaint was made by the Consumers' Association to the Solicitors Regulation Authority (SRA) about Davenport-Lyons' "campaign of letters alleging illegal filesharing".

The case against Davenport Lyons partners David Gore and Brian Miller was the subject of a 7-day hearing at the Solicitors Disciplinary Tribunal (SDT), starting 31 May 2011.

On 8 June 2011, the SDT found that all allegations against the pair had been proven. They were fined £20,000 each, ordered to pay interim costs of £150,000, and suspended from practising for three months. The SRA said:

Solicitors have a duty to act with integrity, independence and in the best interests of their clients. Solicitors who breach those duties can expect to face action by the SRA.

=== Groups against Davenport Lyons ===
In response to Davenport Lyons' initial campaign against suspected file sharers, the pressure group 'Being Threatened' was created, to enable those wrongly accused to take action. They offer the same support and advice to people now being targeted in a similar manner by law firm ACS:Law. British technology news site The Register reported that some staff transferred from Davenport Lyons to ACS:Law to continue the work.

=== Administration ===
Davenport Lyons entered into administration on 25 April 2014. It will be acquired by Mayfair-based law firm Gordon Dadds.
