= Su Pollard =

British actress and singer (born 1949)

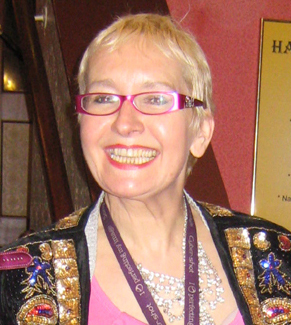
- Pollard in Lincoln, 2005
- Born: Susan Georgina Pollard; 7 November 1949 (age 76); Nottingham, England
- Occupations: Actress; singer; songwriter; author
- Years active: 1974–present
- Spouse: Peter Keogh (m. 1984; div. 1992)
- Website: supollard.com

Susan Georgina "Su" Pollard (born 7 November 1949) is a British actress, singer, songwriter and author whose career has spanned over 50 years. Pollard is most known for her role in the sitcom Hi-de-Hi! She also appeared in the sitcoms You Rang, M'Lord? and Oh, Doctor Beeching!

Pollard has appeared in over 35 stage plays and musicals, as well as over 40 pantomimes. As a singer, she scored a UK Singles Chart number two hit with the song "Starting Together" in 1986, and recorded an album, Su. She also authored two memoirs, Hearts and Showers and Fully Charged in 2026.

== Early life and education ==
Pollard was born in Nottingham, the eldest daughter of Don and Hilda Pollard. Her interest in acting began at the age of six, when she played an angel in a school nativity play.

She lived on Prospect Terrace, off Alfreton Road. Pollard took part in productions at the Nottingham Arts Theatre, and was in the Beeston Operatic Society.

Pollard attended Berridge Road School (Hyson Green) and Peveril Bilateral School, Robin's Wood Road (now Nottingham Girls' Academy).

After leaving school at the age of 16, she got a job at the Tennant Rubber Company in Carlton as a shorthand typist, and began singing in working men's clubs. She also performed in charity shows.

== Career ==
Following an apprenticeship at the Arts Theatre in Nottingham, Pollard appeared on Opportunity Knocks in 1974, singing "I Cain't Say No" from Oklahoma!, and came second to a singing Jack Russell.

She went on to direct the musicals The Desert Song and Rose-Marie with John Hanson. Pollard has also starred in the Cameron Mackintosh West End production of Godspell, played opposite Jack Wild in Big Sin City at the Roundhouse and toured in the musical Grease as part of a company that also included Tracey Ullman. Pollard appeared with Tim Brooke-Taylor and Hugh Paddick in the farce Not Now, Darling, won a role in Andrew Sachs's play Philately Will Get You Nowhere and appeared at the Mermaid Theatre in a celebration of the music of Cole Porter, titled Oh Mr. Porter! She also appeared as the hostess in the 1980 documentary short The Great British Striptease, which was compered by Bernard Manning in Blackpool.

Pollard's first comedy role was in a BBC series screened in 1979, Two Up, Two Down, in which she played a hippy named Flo. Paul Nicholas played her partner, Jimmy; they were squatting in the house of a nice middle-class couple. It lasted for only one series, but later that year came the pilot programme for a new BBC comedy written by Jimmy Perry and David Croft set in a holiday camp. Pollard landed the role of chalet maid Peggy Ollerenshaw in Hi-de-Hi! She continued in this role until the programme's end in 1988. During the run of Hi-de-Hi!, Pollard also had a singing career, and in 1986, she reached No. 2 in the UK singles chart with the song "Starting Together", the theme song from the BBC Television 'fly-on-the-wall' documentary series The Marriage. It was her only Top 40 hit; her first single, "Come to Me (I Am Woman)", had reached No. 71 in 1985, and her only charting album, Su, peaked at No. 86 in the UK Albums Chart in November 1986. In 1987, she toured the UK with The Su Pollard Show and co-hosted It's a Royal Knockout.

Pollard starred in the stage production of Hi De Hi! – The Holiday Musical, along with most of the cast from the television series, playing sell out seasons in Bournemouth, London and Blackpool. In 1985, she played Sally in the West End production of Me And My Girl at the Adelphi Theatre, which she appeared in for over a year. This was followed by roles in a national tour of Rodgers and Hart's Babes in Arms, playing Bonny Byrun opposite Matthew Kelly, and the title role in Sweet Charity at the Connaught Theatre, Worthing.

When Hi-de-Hi! ended in early 1988, writers Perry and Croft chose Pollard to star as Ivy Teasdale in their new sitcom You Rang, M'Lord?, which featured her Hi-de-Hi! co-stars Paul Shane and Jeffrey Holland. This period sitcom ran from 1988 to 1993. In 1990, she hosted the short-lived ITV game show Take the Plunge, which was cancelled after one season. In 1993, she won the "Rear of the Year" award. From 1993 until 1996, Pollard starred opposite Gorden Kaye in For Better or for Worse, a BBC Radio 2 sitcom about an engaged-to-be-married couple.

From 1995 to 1997, Pollard played Ethel Schumann in another David Croft sitcom, Oh, Doctor Beeching! From 1989 to 1990, she voiced the lead character in the BBC children's television series Penny Crayon.

In 2001, Pollard made a guest appearance in Gimme Gimme Gimme and voiced Noisy in Little Robots. The same year, she presented Songs of Praise three times. She has made four appearances on Just a Minute, and also regularly appears in pantomimes and other stage shows, including Annie and The Pirates of Penzance. In 2008, Pollard starred in the musical Shout! alongside Claire Sweeney. From April 2009, Pollard appeared in the London transfer of Shout! at the Arts Theatre. In December 2010, Pollard had a guest role in the Christmas special of ITV's sitcom Benidorm, playing herself. In December 2011, she appeared as a guest on BBC One's Strictly Come Dancing.

In the 2012 film Run for Your Wife, she had a cameo role as a shopkeeper. She took part in Who's Doing the Dishes? in September 2016, and in 2018 she appeared in ITV's reality series Last Laugh in Vegas.

In pantomime, Pollard appeared regularly as the Wicked Queen in Snow White and The Seven Dwarfs, in 2014 in Sunderland, 2015 in Blackpool, Tunbridge Wells in 2016, Aylesbury in 2017 and in Malvern in 2018. In 2019, Pollard starred as Queen Rat in Dick Whittington in Wolverhampton, alongside her Hi-de-Hi! co star Jeffrey Holland.

Pollard was one of a group of seven celebrities who appeared in Pilgrimage: The Road Through Portugal, a BBC Two series journeying to Fátima, Portugal.

As of 2025, she is touring the UK with her one-woman show Su Pollard: Still Fully Charged, which marks her 50 years in show business.

== Personal life ==
Pollard was married to Peter Keogh from 1984 to 1992. In 2014, Keogh published his memoir, My Hi-de-High Life: Before, During and After Su Pollard.

Pollard is a supporter of Nottingham Forest football club.

== Theatre ==
- Godspell, national tour, 1974–75
- The Desert Song, national tour, 1975
- Rose-Marie, national tour, 1976
- Oh Mr Porter!, Mermaid Theatre, 1977
- Big Sin City, national tour, 1978
- Cha-Cha, Grease, Astoria Theatre, 1979
- Grease national tour, as Cha-Cha, 1979
- Philately Will Get You Nowhere, 1981
- Janie, Not Now Darling, Plymouth Hoe Theatre, 1981
- Peggy, Hi-de-Hi! The Holiday Musical, Bournemouth, 1983
- Peggy, Hi-de-Hi! The Holiday Musical, Victoria Palace, London, 1983–84
- Peggy, Hi-de-Hi! The Holiday Musical, Opera House, Blackpool, 1984
- Bunny Byron, Babes in Arms national tour, 1985
- Sally Smith, Me and My Girl, Adelphi Theatre, 1985–86
- Charity Hope, Sweet Charity, Connaught Theatre, Worthing, 1986
- Charity Hope, Sweet Charity national tour, 1986
- The Su Pollard Show, national tour, 1987
- A Song, A Frock and A Tinkle, Donmar Warehouse, 1987
- A Song, A Frock and A Tinkle, national tour, 1987
- Suzette, Don't Dress For Dinner national tour, 1991
- Suzette, Don't Dress For Dinner New Zealand tour, 1991
- The Good Sex Guide Revue, New Zealand tour, 1992
- Habeas Corpus, Far East tour, 1993
- Audrey, Little Shop Of Horrors, national tour, 1994
- Blackpool's Biggest Show, North Pier Blackpool, 1995
- Pam, That's Showbiz, Wimbledon Theatre, 1997
- Miss Skillon, See How They Run, Bournemouth summer season, 1998
- Miss Skillon, See How They Run, national tour, 1998
- Angela, Abigail's Party, national tour, 2000
- Pirate Maid Ruth, The Pirates Of Penzance, national tour, 2001
- Miss Hannigan, Annie national tour, 2002–03
- The Vagina Monologues, national tour, 2003
- Ellen Small, A Happy Medium, national tour, 2004
- Miss Hannigan, Annie, national tour, 2004
- The Vagina Monologues, national tour, 2005
- The Nurse, Romeo and Juliet, national tour, 2006
- The Vagina Monologues, national tour, 2006
- Menopause The Musical, Shaw Theatre, 2007
- Aunt Yvonne, Shout! The Swinging 60s Musical, national tour, 2008
- Aunt Yvonne, Shout! The Swinging 60s Musical, Arts Theatre, 2009
- Miss Hannigan, Annie, national tour, 2009
- Miss Hannigan, Annie, national tour, 2010
- Miss Hannigan, Annie, national tour, 2011
- Miss Hannigan, Annie, Hong Kong/Singapore, 2012
- Miss Hannigan, Annie, New Zealand tour, 2014
- Maid Marian, Ha Ha Hood! And The Prince Of Leaves national tour, 2014
- In Conversation With Tim Macarthur, 2015
- La Voi Meets Su Pollard, 2017
- Birdie, Harpy, Edinburgh Fringe, 2018
- Dick Whittington, Wolverhampton Grand Theatre as Queen Rat, 2019
- Birdie, Harpy, national tour, 2020
- Still Fully Charged, national tour, 2024–26
- Aunt Carabosse, Sleeping Beauty, Darlington Hippodrome, 2024

== Filmography ==
=== Feature films ===
- Hostess, The Great British Striptease, documentary short, 1980
- Shopkeeper, Run for Your Wife 2012

=== Television roles (acting) ===
- Flo, Two Up, Two Down, 1979
- Peggy Ollerenshaw, Hi-de-Hi!, 1980–1988
- Ivy Teasdale, You Rang, M'Lord?, 1988, 1990–1993
- Daisy, According To Daisy, unaired pilot episode only, 1989
- Penny, Penny Crayon, animation, voiceover, 1989
- Jemima Puddle-Duck, The World of Peter Rabbit and Friends, animation, voiceover, 1993
- Ethel Schuman, Oh, Doctor Beeching!, 1995–1997
- Heidi Honeycomb, Gimme Gimme Gimme, 2001
- Noisy, Little Robots, animation, voiceover, 2003
- Herself, Benidorm – Christmas Special, 2010
- Mrs Cupelle, Hacker Time, 2016
- Gloria Swoon, Claude, animation, voiceover, 2018
- Mary, Doctors, 2018
- Mary, Andy and The Band, 2019

=== Television appearances (as herself) ===
- Opportunity Knocks, 1974
- The Saturday Picture Show, 1981
- Me and My Town, 1982
- The Russell Harty Show, 1982
- The Grace Kennedy Show, 1982
- No. 73, 1982
- Give Us a Clue, 1982
- The Royal Variety Performance, 1982
- Wogan, 1983
- Saturday Superstore, 1983
- Breakfast Time, 1983
- The Kenny Everett Show, 1983
- Entertainment Express, 1983
- Sunday Sunday, 1984
- Aspel & Co, 1984
- TV-am/Good Morning Britain, 1984
- Look Who's Talking, 1984
- The Laughter Show, 1984
- Live Aid, 1985
- The Royal Variety Performance, 1985
- Night of 100 Stars, 1985
- The Val Doonican Show, 1985
- The Bob Monkhouse Show, 1985
- Pebble Mill at One, 1985
- Tom O'Connor's Roadshow, 1985
- The Royal Variety Performance, 1986
- Top of the Pops, 1986
- Joan Rivers – Can We Talk?, 1986
- TV-am/Good Morning Britain, 1986
- Pebble Mill at One, 1986
- Off The Record, 1986
- TV-am/Good Morning Britain, 1986
- Pebble Mill at One, 1987
- Open Air, 1987
- It's a Royal Knockout, 1987
- Jackanory, 1987
- Get Fresh, 1988
- Let's Face The Music Of, 1988
- Give Us a Clue, 1988
- Star Memories, 1988
- Through the Keyhole, 1988
- Mid-Day Show (Australia), 1988
- This Is Your Life, 1989
- Take the Plunge, 1989
- Daytime Live, 1990
- Coast To Coast People, 1991
- Channel 4's Love Weekend, 1993
- Noel's House Party (Gotcha!), 1993
- The Ant and Dec Show, 1995
- Call Up the Stars, 1995
- This Morning, 1997
- The Generation Game, 1997
- Just a Minute, 1999
- I Love 1986, 2001
- Songs of Praise, 2001
- RI:SE, 2002
- Liquid News, 2003
- Stars Reunited – Hi-de-Hi! Special, 2003
- Scotland Today, 2003
- The Weakest Link, 2003
- Songs of Praise, 2004
- Comedy Connections – Hi-de-Hi!, 2004
- Loose Women, 2005
- Dick & Dom in da Bungalow, 2005
- Loose Women, 2006
- The Best of the Royal Variety, 2006
- Mr Custard's Night With the Stars, 2006
- Loose Women, 2006
- The Prince's Trust 30th Birthday Live (Blankety Blank), 2006
- The Paul O'Grady Show, 2007
- This Morning, 2007
- Destination Lunch, 2007
- Loose Women, 2007
- Anglia Tonight, 2007
- The Paul O'Grady Show, 2007
- Loose Women, 2007
- BBC News, 2008
- Central Tonight, 2008
- Loose Women, 2008
- Look North, 2008
- Loose Women, 2009
- Richard & Judy, 2009
- Daily Cooks Challenge, 2009
- BBC Breakfast, 2009
- Loose Women, 2009
- Look North, 2009
- Daily Cooks, 2009
- Loose Women, 2010
- This Morning, 2010
- Bucks TV, 2011
- This Morning, 2011
- Loose Women, 2011
- Strictly Come Dancing Christmas Special, 2011
- ... Sings The Beatles, 2011
- You Have Been Watching... David Croft, 2011
- The Big Fat Quiz Of The 80s, 2012
- Strictly Come Dancing: It Takes Two, 2012
- Blackpool's Big Night Out, 2012
- Les Dawson: An Audience With That Never Was, 2013
- Piers Morgan's Life Stories: Gloria Hunniford, 2013
- Big Brother's Bit on the Side, 2013
- Pointless Celebrities, 2013
- The Paul O'Grady Show, 2013
- TVNZ Breakfast (New Zealand), 2013
- Good Morning (New Zealand), 2013
- 3 News (New Zealand), 2013
- All Aboard: East Coast Trains, 2013
- Good Morning (New Zealand), 2014
- Pointless Celebrities, 2014
- Lorraine, 2015
- Pointless Celebrities, 2015
- Big Brother's Bit on the Side, 2016
- Celebrity Antiques Road Trip, 2016
- Who's Doing the Dishes?, 2016
- Lorraine, 2016
- The Baby Boomer's Guide To Growing Old, 2017
- 100: A Tribute To Dame Vera Lynn, 2017
- Lorraine, 2017
- Strictly Come Dancing – It Takes Two, 2017
- Big Brother's Bit on the Side, 2017
- Loose Women, 2018
- BBC Breakfast, 2018
- Through the Keyhole, 2018
- Last Laugh in Vegas, 2018
- The Keith & Paddy Picture Show (Gremlins), 2018
- Britain's Favourite Chocolate Bar, 2019
- Strictly Come Dancing – It Takes Two, 2019
- Pointless Celebrities, 2019
- Britain's Favourite Crisp, 2019
- When Talent Shows Go Horribly Wrong, 2019
- Celebrity Murder Mystery, 2020
- The Chase: Celebrity Special, 2020
- Celebrity Masterchef, 2021
- Celebrity Masterchef: Christmas Cook Off, 2021
- Blankety Blank, 2022
- Richard Osman's Festive House of Games, 2022
- Would I Lie to You?, 2023
- Pilgrimage: The Road Through Portugal, 2023
- Sally Lindsay's 70s Quiz Night, 2025

== Discography ==
=== Singles ===
- October 1985: "Come to Me (I Am Woman)" (UK No. 71)
- January 1986: "Starting Together" (UK No. 2)
- July 1986: "You've Lost That Loving Feeling"
- November 1986: "Wives Will Always Be the Last to Know"
- March 1987: "Come to Me (I Am Woman)" (re-issue)
- 1990: "My Miracle"

=== Albums ===
- November 1986: Su (UK No. 86)
- 2001: The Collection
