= Brian Song =

"Brian"

Single by Monty Python

from the album Monty Python's Life of Brian
- A-side: "Always Look on the Bright Side of Life" (double A-side)
- Released: 16 November 1979
- Genre: Comedy; soundtrack
- Label: Warner Bros.
- Composers: Andre Jacquemin; Dave Howman
- Lyricist: Michael Palin
- Producers: Andre Jacquemin; Dave Howman

Monty Python singles chronology
"Python On Song" (1976)	"Brian" / "Always Look on the Bright Side of Life" (1979)	"I Like Chinese" (1980)

"Brian Song" is the title song from the 1979 film Monty Python's Life of Brian. It was released as a single in the UK on 16 November 1979 as a Double A side with "Always Look on the Bright Side of Life". The song, which charts the growth of the Brian character to manhood, was composed by Andre Jacquemin and Dave Howman with lyrics by Michael Palin. It was performed by sixteen-year-old Sonia Jones, pastiching the vocal style of Shirley Bassey, with a string and brass accompaniment in the style of a John Barry film theme (the entire brass section was performed via extensive multitracking by John Du Prez). It is included on the Monty Python's Life of Brian album and on the CD Monty Python Sings. In 2013 Martin Chilton, the culture editor for The Telegraph website, listed it as one of the five best Monty Python songs.

In 2009, Jones re-recorded the song for the opening credits of the six-part documentary series Monty Python: Almost the Truth (Lawyers Cut), with altered lyrics referring to "Python" rather than "Brian". Five different versions were used for the first five episodes, with Jones sounding increasingly fed up with performing the song. On the sixth and final episode she was replaced by Iron Maiden vocalist Bruce Dickinson.
