= List of songs recorded by ABBA =

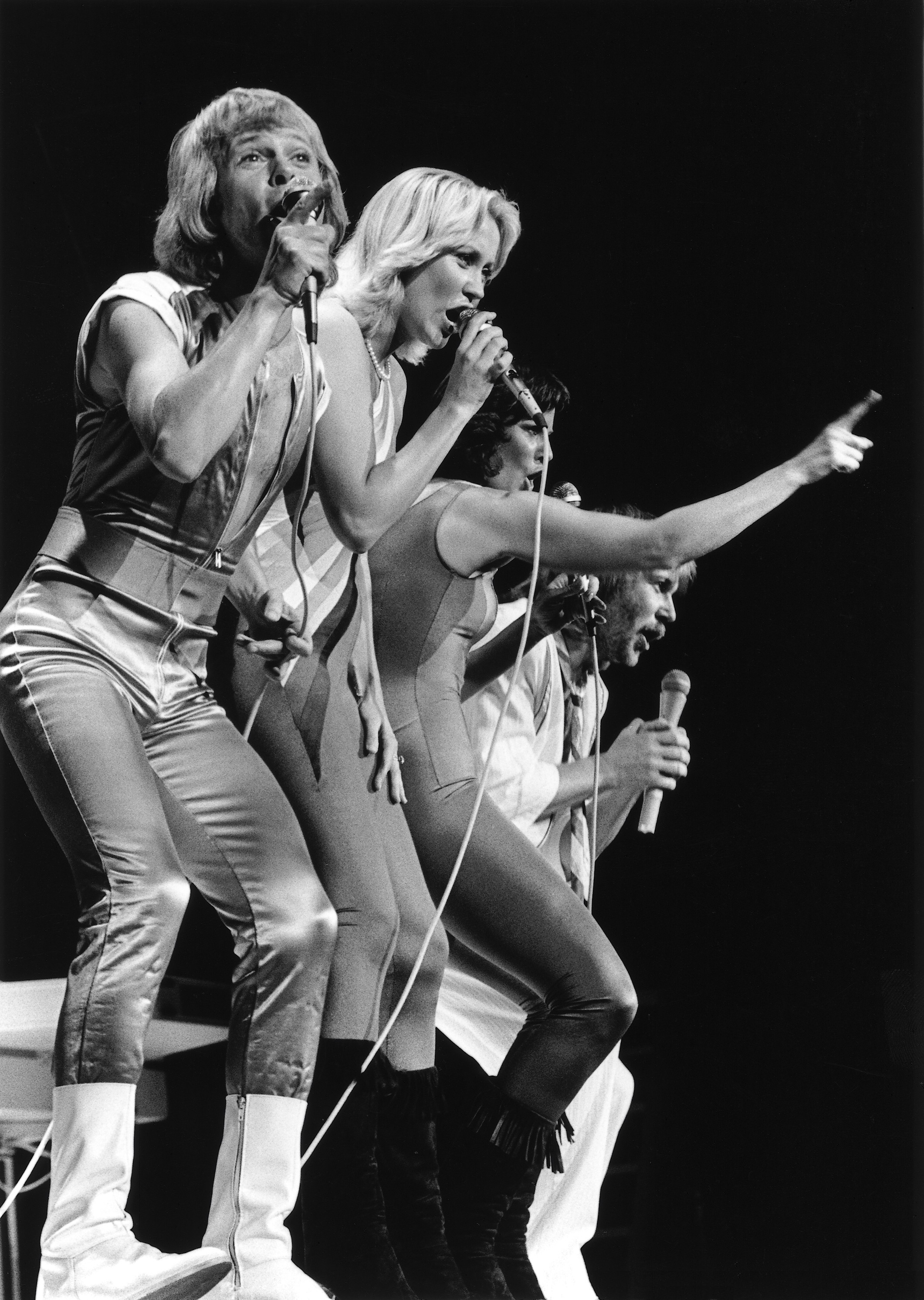
ABBA performing in Edmonton, Canada in 1979.

The following is a list of songs released by the Swedish supergroup ABBA, which was formed in Stockholm by Agnetha Fältskog, Björn Ulvaeus, Benny Andersson, and Anni-Frid Lyngstad. Including their releases under their former name "Björn & Benny, Agnetha & Anni-Frid" or "Björn & Benny, Agnetha & Frida", ABBA have released songs for nine studio albums, a Spanish language album, a series of compilations and two live albums. A number of unreleased songs recorded by ABBA have not appeared on any of these releases.

== List of songs released by ABBA ==
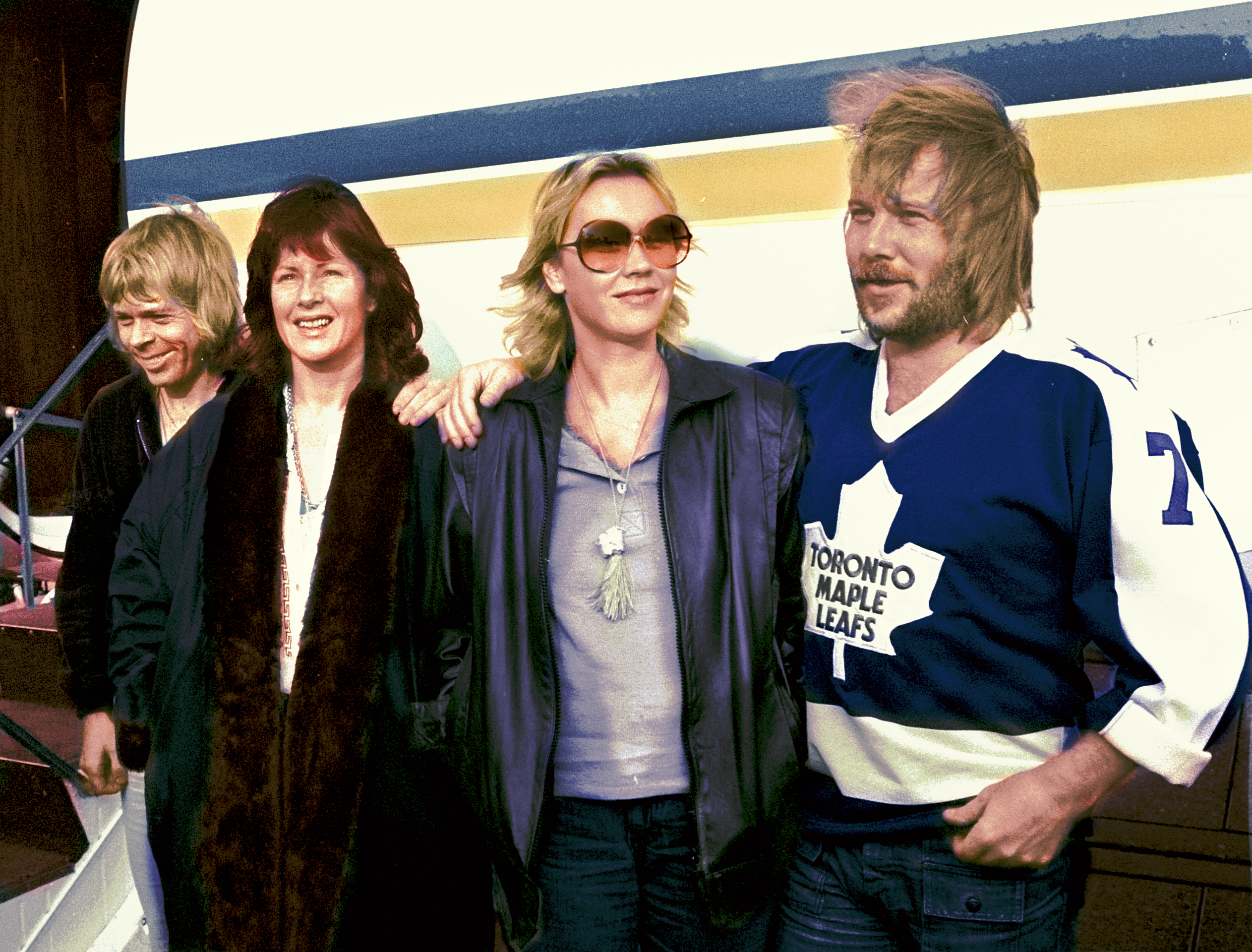
Most ABBA songs were written and produced by Benny Andersson (right) and Björn Ulvaeus (left), with lead vocals most often handled by Anni-Frid Lyngstad (centre left) and Agnetha Fältskog (centre right).

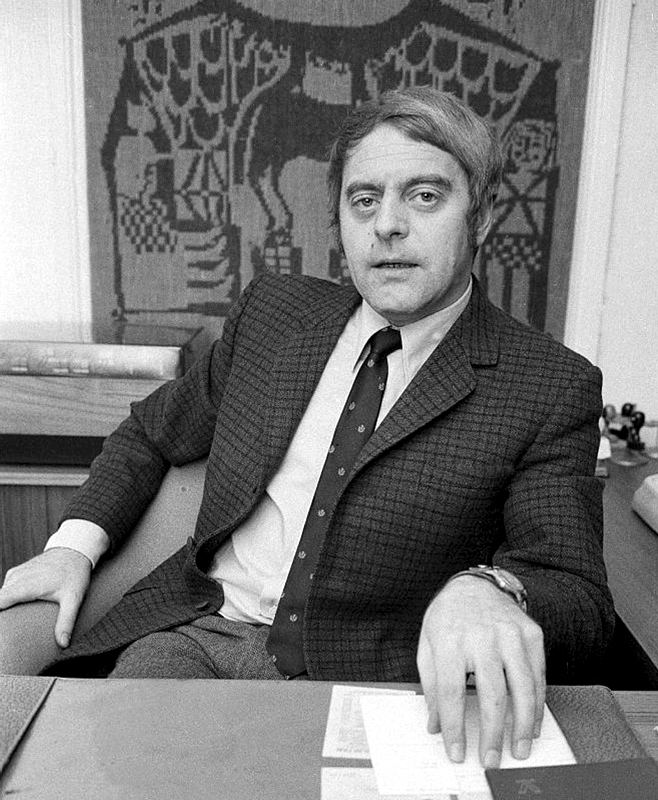
ABBA's manager Stig Anderson co-wrote several of the band's songs' lyrics. ABBA wrote the song "Hovas vittne", privately released for the band and ABBA's friends, for Anderson's 50th birthday.

Key
#	Indicates songs which were re-recorded by ABBA with different lyrics, vocals, mixing, and/or instrumentation in a language that was not its original language

Song	Writer(s)	Lead vocalist(s)	Original album release	Year of album release
"ABBA Undeleted" (Note: "ABBA Undeleted" is a medley consisting of excerpts of the unreleased songs "Scaramouche" / "Summer Night City" (early version) / "Take a Chance on Me" (early instrumental version) / "Baby" (early version of "Rock Me") / "Just a Notion" (since partially re-recorded for the 2021 album Voyage) / "Rikky Rock 'n' Roller" / "Burning My Bridges" / "Fernando" (early Swedish solo version by Frida) / "Here Comes Rubie Jamie" / "Hamlet III" (Parts 1 & 2) / "Free as a Bumble Bee" / "Rubber Ball Man" / "Crying Over You" / "Just Like That" and "Givin' a Little Bit More".)	Benny Andersson; Björn Ulvaeus; Stig Anderson	—	Thank You for the Music	1994
"Al Andar" #	Andersson; Ulvaeus; Anderson; Buddy McCluskey; Mary McCluskey	Agnetha	Gracias por la música	1980
"Andante, Andante"	Andersson; Ulvaeus	Frida	Super Trouper	1980
"Andante, Andante" (Spanish Version) #	Andersson; Ulvaeus; B McCluskey; M McCluskey	Frida	Super Trouper (Latin American and Spanish versions)	1980
"Angeleyes"	Andersson; Ulvaeus	Agnetha & Frida	Voulez-Vous	1979
"Another Town, Another Train"	Andersson; Ulvaeus	Björn	Ring Ring	1973
"Arrival" (Note: "Arrival" is primarily an instrumental but features some vocalisations.)	Andersson; Ulvaeus	(instrumental)	Arrival	1976
"As Good as New"	Andersson; Ulvaeus	Agnetha	Voulez-Vous	1979
"Bang-A-Boomerang"	Andersson; Ulvaeus; Anderson	Agnetha & Frida	ABBA	1975
"Bumblebee"	Andersson; Ulvaeus	Frida	Voyage	2021
"Cassandra"	Andersson; Ulvaeus	Frida	B-side to "The Day Before You Came"	1982
"Chiquitita"	Andersson; Ulvaeus	Agnetha	Voulez-Vous	1979
"Chiquitita" (Spanish Version) #	Andersson; Ulvaeus; B McCluskey; M McCluskey	Agnetha	Gracias por la música	1980
"Conociéndome, conociéndote" #	Andersson; Ulvaeus; Anderson; B McCluskey; M McCluskey	Frida	Gracias por la música	1980
"Crazy World"	Andersson; Ulvaeus	Björn	B-side to "Money, Money, Money"	1976
"¡Dame! ¡Dame! ¡Dame!" #	Andersson; Ulvaeus; Anderson; B McCluskey; M McCluskey	Agnetha	Gracias por la música	1980
"Dance (While the Music Still Goes On)"	Andersson; Ulvaeus	Björn & Benny; Agnetha & Frida	Waterloo	1974
"Dancing Queen"	Andersson; Ulvaeus; Anderson	Agnetha & Frida	Arrival	1976
"The Day Before You Came"	Andersson; Ulvaeus	Agnetha	The Singles: The First Ten Years	1982
"Disillusion"	Agnetha Fältskog; Ulvaeus	Agnetha	Ring Ring	1973
"Does Your Mother Know"	Andersson; Ulvaeus	Björn	Voulez-Vous	1979
"Don't Shut Me Down"	Andersson; Ulvaeus	Agnetha	Voyage	2021
"Dream World"	Andersson; Ulvaeus	Agnetha & Frida	Thank You for the Music	1994
"Dum Dum Diddle"	Andersson; Ulvaeus	Agnetha & Frida	Arrival	1976
"Eagle"	Andersson; Ulvaeus	Agnetha & Frida	The Album	1977
"Elaine"	Andersson; Ulvaeus	Agnetha & Frida	B-side to "The Winner Takes It All"	1980
"En hälsning till våra parkarrangörer" (Note: "En hälsning till våra parkarrangörer" was released as a promo single to promote the group's Swedish Folkpark tour in 1972. The track includes excerpts from "People Need Love", "Man vill ju liva lite dessemellan" (Anni-Frid Lyngstad solo song) and Så glad som dina ögon" (Agnetha Fältskog solo song). It was commercially released in 2013 on a deluxe edition of Ring Ring)	Fältskog; Kenneth Gärdestad; Andersson; Ulvaeus; F. Evangelisti; V. Tariciotti; M. Marrocchi; Anderson	—	Swedish promo single 1972	1972
"Estoy Soñando" #	Andersson; Ulvaeus; B McCluskey; M McCluskey	Frida	Gracias por la música	1980
"Felicidad" #	Andersson; Ulvaeus; B McCluskey; M McCluskey	Agnetha	Super Trouper (Latin American and Spanish versions)	1980
"Fernando"	Andersson; Ulvaeus; Anderson	Frida	"Fernando" standalone single	1976
"Fernando" (Spanish Version) #	Andersson; Ulvaeus; Anderson; B McCluskey; M McCluskey	Frida	Gracias por la música	1980
"From a Twinkling Star to a Passing Angel"	Andersson; Ulvaeus	Frida	The Visitors (Deluxe Edition)	2012
"Gammal fäbodspalm" (Live)	Oskar Fredrik Lindberg	(instrumental)	Live at Wembley Arena	2014
"Gimme! Gimme! Gimme! (A Man After Midnight)"	Andersson; Ulvaeus	Agnetha	Voulez-Vous	1979
"Gonna Sing You My Love Song"	Andersson; Ulvaeus	Frida	Waterloo	1974
"Gracias por la música" #	Andersson; Ulvaeus; B McCluskey; M McCluskey	Agnetha	Gracias por la música	1980
"Happy Hawaii"	Andersson; Ulvaeus; Anderson	Agnetha & Frida	B-side to "Knowing Me, Knowing You"	1977
"Happy New Year"	Andersson; Ulvaeus	Agnetha	Super Trouper	1980
"Hasta Mañana"	Andersson; Ulvaeus; Anderson	Agnetha	Waterloo	1974
"Hasta Mañana" (Spanish Version) #	Andersson; Ulvaeus; Anderson; B McCluskey; M McCluskey	Agnetha	Gracias por la música	1980
"He Is Your Brother"	Andersson; Ulvaeus	Björn & Benny; Agnetha & Frida	Ring Ring	1973
"Head over Heels"	Andersson; Ulvaeus	Agnetha	The Visitors	1981
"Hey, Hey Helen"	Andersson; Ulvaeus	Agnetha & Frida	ABBA	1975
"Hole in Your Soul"	Andersson; Ulvaeus	Agnetha & Frida	The Album	1977
"Honey, Honey"	Andersson; Ulvaeus; Anderson	Agnetha & Frida; Björn	Waterloo	1974
"Honey, Honey" (Swedish Version) #	Andersson; Ulvaeus; Anderson	Agnetha & Frida; Björn	B-side to "Waterloo" (Swedish Version)	1974
"Hovas vittne"	Andersson; Ulvaeus; Fältskog; Anni-Frid Lyngstad; Rune Söderqvist; Michael B. Tretow	Agnetha & Frida	"Hovas vittne" private release promo single	1981
"I Am Just a Girl"	Andersson; Ulvaeus; Anderson	Björn & Benny; Agnetha & Frida	Ring Ring	1973
"I Am the City"	Andersson; Ulvaeus	Frida, Agnetha	More ABBA Gold	1993
"I Can Be That Woman"	Andersson; Ulvaeus	Agnetha	Voyage	2021
"I Do, I Do, I Do, I Do, I Do"	Andersson; Ulvaeus	Agnetha & Frida	ABBA	1975
"I Have a Dream"	Andersson; Ulvaeus	Frida	Voulez-Vous	1979
"I Let the Music Speak"	Andersson; Ulvaeus	Frida	The Visitors	1981
"I Saw It in the Mirror"	Andersson; Ulvaeus	Björn & Benny	Ring Ring	1973
"I Still Have Faith in You"	Andersson; Ulvaeus	Frida	Voyage	2021
"I Wonder (Departure)"	Andersson; Ulvaeus; Anderson	Frida	The Album	1977
"I'm a Marionette"	Andersson; Ulvaeus	Agnetha & Frida	The Album	1977
"I'm Still Alive" (Live)	Fältskog; Ulvaeus	Agnetha	Live at Wembley Arena	2014
"I've Been Waiting for You"	Andersson; Ulvaeus; Anderson	Agnetha	ABBA	1975
"If It Wasn't for the Nights"	Andersson; Ulvaeus	Agnetha & Frida	Voulez-Vous	1979
"Intermezzo No. 1" (Instrumental)	Andersson; Ulvaeus	(instrumental)	ABBA	1975
"Just a Notion"	Andersson; Ulvaeus	Agnetha & Frida	Voyage	2021
"Keep an Eye on Dan"	Andersson; Ulvaeus	Agnetha	Voyage	2021
"The King Has Lost His Crown"	Andersson; Ulvaeus	Frida	Voulez-Vous	1979
"King Kong Song"	Andersson; Ulvaeus	Björn; Agnetha & Frida	Waterloo	1974
"Kisses of Fire"	Andersson; Ulvaeus	Agnetha	Voulez-Vous	1979
"Knowing Me, Knowing You"	Andersson; Ulvaeus; Anderson	Frida	Arrival	1976
"La reina del baile" (also titled "Reina Danzante") #	Andersson; Ulvaeus; Anderson; B McCluskey; M McCluskey	Agnetha & Frida	Gracias por la música	1980
"Lay All Your Love on Me"	Andersson; Ulvaeus	Agnetha	Super Trouper	1980
"Like an Angel Passing Through My Room"	Andersson; Ulvaeus	Frida	The Visitors	1981
"Little Things"	Andersson; Ulvaeus	Frida and Agnetha	Voyage	2021
"Love Isn't Easy (But It Sure Is Hard Enough)"	Andersson; Ulvaeus	Björn & Benny; Agnetha & Frida	Ring Ring	1973
"Lovelight"	Andersson; Ulvaeus	Agnetha & Frida	B-side to "Chiquitita"	1979
"Lovers (Live a Little Longer)"	Andersson; Ulvaeus	Frida	Voulez-Vous	1979
"Mamma Mia"	Andersson; Ulvaeus; Anderson	Agnetha & Frida	ABBA	1975
"Mamma Mía" (Spanish Version) #	Andersson; Ulvaeus; Anderson; B McCluskey; M McCluskey	Agnetha & Frida	Gracias por la música	1980
"Man in the Middle"	Andersson; Ulvaeus	Björn	ABBA	1975
"Me and Bobby and Bobby's Brother"	Andersson; Ulvaeus	Frida	Ring Ring	1973
"Me and I"	Andersson; Ulvaeus	Frida	Super Trouper	1980
"Medley: Pick a Bale of Cotton / On Top of Old Smokey / Midnight Special"	traditional	Agnetha & Frida	Stars im Zeichen eines guten Sterns	1975
"Money, Money, Money"	Andersson; Ulvaeus	Frida	Arrival	1976
"Move On"	Andersson; Ulvaeus; Anderson	Björn; Agnetha	The Album	1977
"My Love, My Life"	Andersson; Ulvaeus; Anderson	Agnetha	Arrival	1976
"My Mama Said"	Andersson; Ulvaeus	Agnetha & Frida	Waterloo	1974
"The Name of the Game"	Andersson; Ulvaeus; Anderson	Agnetha & Frida	The Album	1977
"Nina, Pretty Ballerina"	Andersson; Ulvaeus	Agnetha & Frida	Ring Ring	1973
"No Doubt About It"	Andersson; Ulvaeus	Frida	Voyage	2021
"No hay a quien culpar" #	Andersson; Ulvaeus; B McCluskey; M McCluskey	Frida	The Visitors (Latin American and Spanish versions)	1981
"Ode to Freedom"	Andersson; Ulvaeus	Frida and Agnetha	Voyage	2021
"On and On and On"	Andersson; Ulvaeus	Agnetha & Frida	Super Trouper	1980
"One Man, One Woman"	Andersson; Ulvaeus	Frida	The Album	1977
"One of Us"	Andersson; Ulvaeus	Agnetha	The Visitors	1981
"Our Last Summer"	Andersson; Ulvaeus	Frida	Super Trouper	1980
"People Need Love"	Andersson; Ulvaeus	Björn & Benny; Agnetha & Frida	"People Need Love" standalone single	1972
"The Piper"	Andersson; Ulvaeus	Agnetha & Frida	Super Trouper	1980
"Put on Your White Sombrero"	Andersson; Ulvaeus	Frida	Thank You for the Music	1994
"Ring Ring" #	Andersson; Ulvaeus; Anderson; Phil Cody; Neil Sedaka	Agnetha & Frida	Ring Ring	1973
"Ring Ring (Bara du slog en signal)"	Andersson; Ulvaeus; Anderson	Agnetha & Frida	Ring Ring (Scandinavian versions)	1973
"Ring Ring" (German Version) #	Andersson; Ulvaeus; Anderson; Peter Lach	Agnetha & Frida	"Ring Ring" German single	1973
"Ring Ring" (Spanish Version) #	Andersson; Ulvaeus; Anderson; Doris Band	Agnetha & Frida	ABBA Más Oro: Más ABBA Exitos	1993
"Ring Ring" (Swedish/Spanish/German Medley) #	Andersson; Ulvaeus; Anderson; Band; Lach	Agnetha & Frida	Thank You for the Music	1994
"Rock Me"	Andersson; Ulvaeus	Björn	ABBA	1975
"Rock 'N' Roll Band"	Andersson; Ulvaeus	Björn & Benny	Ring Ring	1973
"Sång till Görel" (with Stikkan) (Note: "Sång till Görel" was credited to "ABBA & Stikkan".)	Andersson; Anderson; Ulvaeus	Agnetha & Frida; Björn & Benny; and Stig	"Sång till Görel" private release promo single	1979
"Santa Rosa"	Andersson; Ulvaeus	Björn & Benny	B-side to "He Is Your Brother"	1972
"Se me está escapando" #	Andersson; Ulvaeus; B McCluskey; M McCluskey	Agnetha	The Visitors (Latin American and Spanish versions)	1981
"She's My Kind of Girl" (Note: "She's My Kind of Girl" was not originally credited to ABBA, and was originally released by Andersson and Ulvaeus as a single in 1970.)	Andersson; Ulvaeus	Björn & Benny	Ring Ring (International versions)	1973
"Should I Laugh or Cry"	Andersson; Ulvaeus	Frida	B-side to "One of Us"	1981
"Sitting in the Palmtree"	Andersson; Ulvaeus	Björn	Waterloo	1974
"Slipping Through My Fingers"	Andersson; Ulvaeus	Agnetha	The Visitors	1981
"So Long"	Andersson; Ulvaeus	Agnetha & Frida	ABBA	1975
"Soldiers"	Andersson; Ulvaeus	Agnetha	The Visitors	1981
"SOS"	Andersson; Ulvaeus; Anderson	Agnetha	ABBA	1975
"Summer Night City"	Andersson; Ulvaeus	Björn & Benny, Agnetha & Frida	"Summer Night City" standalone single	1978
"Super Trouper"	Andersson; Ulvaeus	Frida	Super Trouper	1980
"Suzy-Hang-Around"	Andersson; Ulvaeus	Benny	Waterloo	1974
"Take a Chance on Me"	Andersson; Ulvaeus	Agnetha & Frida	The Album	1977
"Thank You for the Music"	Andersson; Ulvaeus	Agnetha	The Album	1977
"Thank You for the Music" (Doris Day Version)	Andersson; Ulvaeus	Agnetha	Thank You for the Music	1994
"That's Me"	Andersson; Ulvaeus; Anderson	Agnetha & Frida	Arrival	1976
"Tiger"	Andersson; Ulvaeus	Agnetha & Frida	Arrival	1976
"Tivedshambo" (Instrumental)	Anderson	(instrumental)	B-side to "Hovas vittne" private release promo single	1981
"Tivedshambo"	Anderson	Agnetha & Frida		1986
"Tropical Loveland"	Andersson; Ulvaeus; Anderson	Frida	ABBA	1975
"Two for the Price of One"	Andersson; Ulvaeus	Björn	The Visitors	1981
"Under Attack"	Andersson; Ulvaeus	Agnetha	The Singles: The First Ten Years	1982
"The Visitors"	Andersson; Ulvaeus	Frida	The Visitors	1981
"Voulez-Vous"	Andersson; Ulvaeus	Agnetha & Frida	Voulez-Vous	1979
"Watch Out"	Andersson; Ulvaeus	Björn	Waterloo	1974
"Waterloo" #	Andersson; Ulvaeus; Anderson	Agnetha & Frida	Waterloo	1974
"Waterloo" (French Version) #	Andersson; Ulvaeus; Anderson; Alain Boublil	Agnetha & Frida	"Waterloo" French single	1974
"Waterloo" (French/Swedish Medley) #	Andersson; Ulvaeus; Anderson; Boublil	Agnetha & Frida	Thank You for the Music	1994
"Waterloo" (German Version) #	Andersson; Ulvaeus; Anderson; Gerd Müller-Schwanke	Agnetha & Frida	"Waterloo" West German single	1974
"Waterloo" (Swedish Version)	Andersson; Ulvaeus; Anderson	Agnetha & Frida	"Waterloo" Swedish single / Waterloo (Swedish version)	1974
"The Way Old Friends Do" (Live) (Note: "The Way Old Friends Do" is a live recording from ABBA's live shows at Wembley Arena in November 1978 that was mixed and readjusted with additional instrumentation in ABBA's recording studio. An alternative, entirely live take was released on Live at Wembley Arena in 2014.)	Andersson; Ulvaeus	Agnetha & Frida	Super Trouper	1980
"Wer im Wartesaal der Liebe steht" #	Andersson; Ulvaeus; Fred Jay	Björn	B-side to "Ring Ring" German single	1973
"What About Livingstone"	Andersson; Ulvaeus	Agnetha & Frida	Waterloo	1974
"When All is Said and Done"	Andersson; Ulvaeus	Frida	The Visitors	1981
"When I Kissed the Teacher"	Andersson; Ulvaeus	Agnetha	Arrival	1976
"When You Danced with Me"	Andersson; Ulvaeus	Frida and Agnetha	Voyage	2021
"Why Did It Have to Be Me?"	Andersson; Ulvaeus	Björn; Agnetha & Frida	Arrival	1976
"The Winner Takes It All"	Andersson; Ulvaeus	Agnetha	Super Trouper	1980
"You Owe Me One"	Andersson; Ulvaeus	Frida & Agnetha	B-side to "Under Attack"	1982
"Åh, vilka tider"	Andersson; Ulvaeus	Björn & Benny	B-side to "Ring Ring (Bara du slog en signal)"	1973

== Songs not credited to the group featuring appearances by all ABBA members ==
Song	Credited artist	Writer(s)	Original release	Year of release	Notes	Ref.
"En Carousel"	Björn & Benny	Andersson; Ulvaeus	"En Carousel" Japanese single	1972	Remixed version of "Merry-Go-Round"	
"En karusell"	Björn Ulvaeus & Benny Andersson	Andersson; Ulvaeus	"En karusell" Swedish single	1972	Swedish version of "Merry-Go-Round"	
"Merry-Go-Round" (Also known as "Merry-Go-Round (En karusell)") (Note: "Merry-Go-Round" has been credited to ABBA on later reissues on which it appears.)	Björn & Benny	Andersson; Ulvaeus	B-side to "People Need Love"	1972		
“Ett stilla regn”	Ted Gärdestad	Kenneth Gärdestad; Ted Gärdestad	Undringar	1972	Features background vocals by all ABBA members.	
"Det kan ingen doktor hjälpa"	Benny Andersson & Björn Ulvaeus	Anderson; Andersson; Ulvaeus	"Det kan ingen doktor hjälpa" single	1971	Features uncredited vocals by Fältskog and Lyngstad.	
"Dröm är dröm, och saga saga"	Agnetha Fältskog	Anderson; Gianluigi Guarnieri; Pier Paolo Preti	När en vacker tanke blir en sång	1971	Features vocals by all ABBA members.	
"Gitarren och jag"	Ted Gärdestad	K Gärdestad; T Gärdestad	Ted	1973	Features background vocals by all ABBA members.	
“Glöm dig själv för en dag”	Lena Andersson	Bo Setterlind; Joe South	Lena	1971	Features background vocals by all ABBA members.	
"Hej gamle man!"	Björn Ulvaeus & Benny Andersson	Andersson; Ulvaeus	Lycka	1970	Features uncredited vocals by Fältskog and Lyngstad.	
“Hela världen runt”	Ted Gärdestad	K Gärdestad; T Gärdestad	Undringar	1972	Features background vocals by all ABBA members.	
“Helena”	Ted Gärdestad	K Gärdestad; T Gärdestad	Undringar	1972	Features background vocals by all ABBA members.	
“Jag kommer”	Lena Andersson	B Andersson; Ulvaeus; Sven-Olof Walldoff	Lena	1971	Features background vocals by all ABBA members.	
“Jag vill ha en egen måner”	Ted Gärdestad	K Gärdestad; T Gärdestad	Undringar	1972	Features background vocals by all ABBA members.	
"Kanske var min kind lite het"	Agnetha Fältskog	Fältskog	När en vacker tanke blir en sång	1971	Features vocals by Fältskog, Andersson, and Lyngstad, with production by Ulvaeus.	
"Kom och sjung en sång"	Anni-Frid Lyngstad	Carole King, Anderson	B-side to "Vi är alla barn i början"	1972	Features background vocals by Fältskog, Ulvaeus, and possibly Lyngstad and Andersson, with production by Andersson.	
"Man vill ju leva lite dessemellan"	Anni-Frid Lyngstad	Anderson; F. Evangelisti; M. Marrocchi; V. Tariciotti	"Man vill ju leva lite dessemellan" standalone single	1972	Features background vocals by Fältskog, Andersson, and Ulvaeus.	
"Oh, vilken härlig da"	Ted Gärdestad	K Gärdestad; T Gärdestad	Ted	1973	Features background vocals by all ABBA members.	
"På bröllop"	Björn Ulvaeus & Benny Andersson	Ulvaeus; Andersson	B-side to "Det kan ingen doktor hjälpa"	1971	Features uncredited vocals by Fältskog and Lyngstad.	
"Ska man skratta eller gråta"	Anni-Frid Lyngstad	Anderson; Gianfranco Baldazzi; Rosalino Cellamare; Sergio Bardotti	B-side to "Man vill ju leva lite dessemellan"	1972	Features background vocals by Fältskog, Andersson, and Ulvaeus.	
“Snurra du min värld”	Ted Gärdestad	K Gärdestad; T Gärdestad	Undringar	1972	Features background vocals by all ABBA members.	
"Sången föder dig tillbaka"	Agnetha Fältskog	Björn Carlsson; Fältskog	När en vacker tanke blir en sång	1971	Features vocals by Fältskog, Andersson, and Lyngstad, with production by Ulvaeus.	
“Tom, Tom, käre vän”	Lena Andersson	Anderson; Mike Chapman; Nicky Chinn	Lena	1971	Features background vocals by all ABBA members.	
"Tågen kan gå igen"	Agnetha Fältskog	Bosse Carlgren; Fältskog	När en vacker tanke blir en sång	1971	Features vocals by Fältskog, Andersson, and Lyngstad, with production by Ulvaeus.	
"Tänk om jorden vore ung"	Benny Andersson & Björn Ulvaeus	Ulvaeus; Andersson	"Tänk om jorden vore ung" single	1971	Features uncredited vocals by Fältskog and Lyngstad.	
“Tänk om man bara kunde svara på frågor”	Lena Andersson	Anderson; Mimi Faring	Lena	1971	Features background vocals by all ABBA members.	
"Vi är alla barn i början"	Anni-Frid Lyngstad	Andersson; Ulvaeus	"Vi är alla barn i början" standalone single	1972	Features background vocals by Fältskog, Ulvaeus, and possibly Lyngstad and Andersson, with production by Andersson.	
“Vårnattsmelodi”	Lena Andersson	Olle Adolphson; Guy Béart	Lena	1971	Features background vocals by all ABBA members.	
"Välkommen till världen"	Lill-Babs	Andersson; Ulvaeus	Välkommen till världen	1971	Features background vocals by all ABBA members.	

== See also ==
- ABBA discography
- List of unreleased songs recorded by ABBA

== Bibliography ==
- Palm, Carl Magnus (2017). ABBA: The Complete Recording Sessions (2nd Revised and Expanded ed.). United Kingdom: CPI Group. ISBN 978-91-639-2656-3.
