= The Albums =

Box set by ABBA
- Released: 11 November 2008 (US)
- Recorded: March 1972 – August 1982
- Genres: Pop; synth-pop; dance-pop; disco; pop rock
- Label: Universal Music
- Producers: Benny Andersson; Björn Ulvaeus

ABBA chronology
Number Ones (2006)	The Albums (2008)	ABBA Icon (2010)

Professional ratings
Review scores
Source	Rating
AllMusic	4.5/5 stars

The Albums is a box set of recordings by the Swedish pop group ABBA. It was released on 11 November 2008 through Universal Music. The box set includes nine discs, the first eight are all of the original studio albums the way they were originally released between 1973 and 1981 while the ninth disc features all of the singles that were not released on the band's studio albums along with some of the B-sides. It includes a 40-page booklet on ABBA’s history. It does not include rarities or extras. The box set has charted in several countries.

== Background ==
With ABBA's compilation albums re-charting after the release of the movie Mamma Mia! and its soundtrack, The Albums was released, just three years after the 9 CD/2 DVD set The Complete Studio Recordings (in certain territories available without the DVDs). While the latter comprises 133 tracks on its 9 audio discs, including a host of rarities such as recordings in Spanish, French and German as well as studio outtakes, alternate versions and mixes, The Albums only features 99 of these on the same number of discs.

== Track listing ==
=== CD 1 – Ring Ring (1973) ===
1. "Ring Ring"
2. "Another Town, Another Train"
3. "Disillusion"
4. "People Need Love"
5. "I Saw It in the Mirror"
6. "Nina, Pretty Ballerina"
7. "Love Isn't Easy (But It Sure Is Hard Enough)"
8. "Me and Bobby and Bobby’s Brother"
9. "He Is Your Brother"
10. "She's My Kind of Girl"
11. "I Am Just a Girl"
12. "Rock'n Roll Band"

=== CD 2 – Waterloo (1974) ===
1. "Waterloo"
2. "Sitting in the Palmtree"
3. "King Kong Song"
4. "Hasta Mañana"
5. "My Mama Said"
6. "Dance (While the Music Still Goes On)"
7. "Honey, Honey"
8. "Watch Out"
9. "What About Livingstone?"
10. "Gonna Sing You My Lovesong"
11. "Suzy-Hang-Around"

=== CD 3 – ABBA (1975) ===
1. "Mamma Mia"
2. "Hey, Hey Helen"
3. "Tropical Loveland"
4. "SOS"
5. "Man in the Middle"
6. "Bang-A-Boomerang"
7. "I Do, I Do, I Do, I Do, I Do"
8. "Rock Me"
9. "Intermezzo No. 1"
10. "I've Been Waiting for You"
11. "So Long"

=== CD 4 – Arrival (1976) ===
1. "When I Kissed the Teacher"
2. "Dancing Queen"
3. "My Love, My Life"
4. "Dum Dum Diddle"
5. "Knowing Me, Knowing You"
6. "Money, Money, Money"
7. "That's Me"
8. "Why Did It Have to Be Me?"
9. "Tiger"
10. "Arrival"

=== CD 5 – The Album (1977) ===
1. "Eagle"
2. "Take a Chance on Me"
3. "One Man, One Woman"
4. "The Name of the Game"
5. "Move On"
6. "Hole in Your Soul"

The Girl With the Golden Hair: 3 Scenes From a Mini-Musical

7. "Thank You for the Music"
8. "I Wonder (Departure)"
9. "I'm a Marionette"

=== CD 6 – Voulez-Vous (1979) ===
1. "As Good as New"
2. "Voulez-Vous"
3. "I Have a Dream"
4. "Angeleyes"
5. "The King Has Lost His Crown"
6. "Does Your Mother Know"
7. "If It Wasn't for the Nights"
8. "Chiquitita"
9. "Lovers (Live a Little Longer)"
10. "Kisses of Fire"

=== CD 7 – Super Trouper (1980) ===
1. "Super Trouper"
2. "The Winner Takes It All"
3. "On and on and On"
4. "Andante, Andante"
5. "Me and I"
6. "Happy New Year"
7. "Our Last Summer"
8. "The Piper"
9. "Lay All Your Love on Me"
10. "The Way Old Friends Do"

=== CD 8 – The Visitors (1981) ===
1. "The Visitors"
2. "Head Over Heels"
3. "When All Is Said and Done"
4. "Soldiers"
5. "I Let the Music Speak"
6. "One of Us"
7. "Two for the Price of One"
8. "Slipping Through My Fingers"
9. "Like an Angel Passing Through My Room"

=== CD 9 – Bonus Tracks ===
1. "Merry-Go-Round"
2. "Santa Rosa"
3. "Ring, Ring (Bara du slog en signal)" (Swedish version)
4. "Waterloo" (Swedish version)
5. "Fernando"
6. "Crazy World"
7. "Happy Hawaii"
8. "Summer Night City"
9. "Medley: Pick a Bale of Cotton – On Top of Old Smokey – Midnight Special"
10. "Lovelight"
11. "Gimme! Gimme! Gimme! (A Man After Midnight)"
12. "Elaine"
13. "Should I Laugh or Cry"
14. "You Owe Me One"
15. "Cassandra"
16. "Under Attack"
17. "The Day Before You Came"

== Charts ==
Chart (2008–21)	Peak position
Danish Albums (Hitlisten)	10
Dutch Albums (Album Top 100)	37
Finnish Albums (Suomen virallinen lista)	11
French Albums (SNEP)	57
German Albums (Offizielle Top 100)	24
Italian Albums (FIMI)	48
Norwegian Albums (VG-lista)	7
Romandy Albums (Media Control)	30
Scottish Albums (Official Charts)	89
Swedish Albums (Sverigetopplistan)	4
Swiss Albums (Schweizer Hitparade)	65
UK Albums (Official Charts)	89

== Certifications ==
Region	Certification	Certified units/sales
Denmark (IFPI Danmark)	Gold	15,000^{^}
Sweden (GLF)	Platinum	40,000^{^}
United Kingdom (BPI)	Silver	60,000^{^}
^{^} Shipments figures based on certification alone.

== See also ==
- The Complete Studio Recordings (ABBA album)
- Thank You for the Music (box set)
- Mamma Mia! The Movie
- Mamma Mia! (musical)
- Mamma Mia! The Movie Soundtrack
