= The Complete Studio Recordings (ABBA album) =

Box set by ABBA
- Released: 7 November 2005
- Recorded: 1969–1982
- Studios: Metronome, Stockholm; Polar, Stockholm; Criteria, Miami; Europafilm, Stockholm; KMH, Stockholm; Marcus, Stockholm; Bohus, Kungälv
- Genre: Pop
- Label: Polar / Universal Music Group
- Producers: Benny Andersson, Björn Ulvaeus

ABBA chronology
18 Hits (2005)	The Complete Studio Recordings (2005)	Number Ones (2006)

Professional ratings
Review scores
Source	Rating
AllMusic	4.5/5 stars
The Encyclopedia of Popular Music	3/5 stars
Yahoo! Music	7/10 stars

The Complete Studio Recordings is a box set of all of the studio material released by the Swedish pop group ABBA. It was released on 7 November 2005 and consists of 9 CDs and 2 DVDs, plus a full color booklet with a timeline and photos. Another booklet containing complete lyrics to all of the music was also included.

There is one CD for each of ABBA's 8 studio albums. These CDs also include bonus tracks in the form of non-album tracks and foreign language versions. The final CD contains additional rare tracks, including songs released after the group had disbanded. Of particular interest is the rare alternate mix of "Waterloo", which has never been available on CD before. The extended mono version of "On and On and On"—featuring an extra verse and previously only available as the soundtrack to the song's video—is also released on CD for the first time.

The two DVDs feature all of the band's music videos (except for the "When I Kissed the Teacher" video), plus a documentary (The History) and concert footage from the television special Dick Cavett Meets ABBA, a co-production between Polar Music International and Sveriges Television (SVT). Five of the performances from this program are included on the DVD, as four of the original nine songs are no longer to be found in the SVT archives.

The Complete Studio Recordings was only available for a short period of time and in limited numbers. However, a simpler version of the box set featuring only the 9 CDs and the timeline booklet was released in Denmark in 2006.

The box set was re-released in 2008 to coincide with the release of Mamma Mia! but had limited chart success, mainly due to its high price tag.

As of 2020, The Complete Studio Recordings is not in print and many of the tracks included have made their way on to deluxe editions of ABBA's established albums. As of 2021, this set is no longer “complete” as ABBA released the reunion album Voyage.

== Track listings ==
=== CD 1: Ring Ring (1973) ===
1. "Ring Ring"
2. "Another Town, Another Train"
3. "Disillusion"
4. "People Need Love"
5. "I Saw It in the Mirror"
6. "Nina, Pretty Ballerina"
7. "Love Isn't Easy (But It Sure Is Hard Enough)"
8. "Me and Bobby and Bobby’s Brother"
9. "He Is Your Brother"
10. "She's My Kind of Girl"
11. "I Am Just a Girl"
12. "Rock'n Roll Band"

Bonus tracks

13. "Ring Ring (Bara du slog en signal)" (Swedish version of "Ring Ring")
14. "Åh, vilka tider"
15. "Merry-Go-Round"
16. "Santa Rosa"
17. "Ring Ring" (Spanish version)
18. "Wer Im Wartesaal Der Liebe Steht" (German version of "Another Town, Another Train")
19. "Ring Ring" (German version)

=== CD 2: Waterloo (1974) ===
1. "Waterloo"
2. "Sitting in the Palmtree"
3. "King Kong Song"
4. "Hasta Mañana"
5. "My Mama Said"
6. "Dance (While the Music Still Goes On)"
7. "Honey, Honey"
8. "Watch Out"
9. "What About Livingstone?"
10. "Gonna Sing You My Lovesong"
11. "Suzy-Hang-Around"

Bonus tracks

12. "Ring Ring" (U.S. 1974 remix)
13. "Waterloo" (Swedish version)
14. "Honey, Honey" (Swedish version)
15. "Waterloo" (German version)
16. "Hasta Mañana" (Spanish version)
17. "Ring Ring" (UK 1974 remix)
18. "Waterloo" (French version)

=== CD 3: ABBA (1975) ===
1. "Mamma Mia"
2. "Hey, Hey Helen"
3. "Tropical Loveland"
4. "SOS"
5. "Man in the Middle"
6. "Bang-A-Boomerang"
7. "I Do, I Do, I Do, I Do, I Do"
8. "Rock Me"
9. "Intermezzo No. 1"
10. "I've Been Waiting for You"
11. "So Long"

Bonus tracks

12. "Crazy World"
13. "Medley: Pick a Bale of Cotton – On Top of Old Smokey – Midnight Special" (1978 remix)
14. "Mamma Mia" (Spanish version)

=== CD 4: Arrival (1976) ===
1. "When I Kissed the Teacher"
2. "Dancing Queen"
3. "My Love, My Life"
4. "Dum Dum Diddle"
5. "Knowing Me, Knowing You"
6. "Money, Money, Money"
7. "That's Me"
8. "Why Did It Have to Be Me?"
9. "Tiger"
10. "Arrival"

Bonus tracks

11. "Fernando" (from Greatest Hits (1975))
12. "Happy Hawaii" (Early version of "Why Did It Have to Be Me?")
13. "La Reina Del Baile" (Spanish version of "Dancing Queen")
14. "Conociéndome, Conociéndote" (Spanish version of "Knowing Me, Knowing You")
15. "Fernando" (Spanish version)

=== CD 5: The Album (1977) ===
1. "Eagle"
2. "Take a Chance on Me"
3. "One Man, One Woman"
4. "The Name of the Game"
5. "Move On"
6. "Hole in Your Soul"

The Girl With the Golden Hair–3 Scenes From a Mini-Musical

7. "Thank You for the Music"
8. "I Wonder (Departure)"
9. "I'm a Marionette"

Bonus tracks

10. "Al Andar" (Spanish version of "Move On")
11. "Gracias Por La Música" (Spanish version of "Thank You for the Music")

=== CD 6: Voulez-Vous (1979) ===
1. "As Good as New"
2. "Voulez-Vous"
3. "I Have a Dream"
4. "Angeleyes"
5. "The King Has Lost His Crown"
6. "Does Your Mother Know?"
7. "If It Wasn’t for the Nights"
8. "Chiquitita"
9. "Lovers (Live a Little Longer)"
10. "Kisses of Fire"

Bonus tracks

11. "Summer Night City" (from Greatest Hits Vol. 2 (1979))
12. "Lovelight"
13. "Gimme! Gimme! Gimme! (A Man After Midnight)" (from Greatest Hits Vol. 2 (1979))
14. "Estoy Soñando" (Spanish version of "I Have a Dream")
15. "Chiquitita" (Spanish version)
16. "¡Dame! ¡Dame! ¡Dame!" (Spanish version of "Gimme! Gimme! Gimme! (A Man After Midnight)")

=== CD 7: Super Trouper (1980) ===
1. "Super Trouper"
2. "The Winner Takes It All"
3. "On and on and On"
4. "Andante, Andante"
5. "Me and I"
6. "Happy New Year"
7. "Our Last Summer"
8. "The Piper"
9. "Lay All Your Love on Me"
10. "The Way Old Friends Do"

Bonus tracks

11. "Elaine"
12. "Andante, Andante" (Spanish version)
13. "Felicidad" (Spanish version of "Happy New Year")

=== CD 8: The Visitors (1981) ===
1. "The Visitors"
2. "Head over Heels"
3. "When All Is Said and Done"
4. "Soldiers"
5. "I Let the Music Speak"
6. "One of Us"
7. "Two for the Price of One"
8. "Slipping Through My Fingers"
9. "Like an Angel Passing Through My Room"

Bonus tracks

10. "Should I Laugh or Cry"
11. "No Hay a Quien Culpar" (Spanish version of "When All Is Said and Done")
12. "Se Me Está Escapando" (Spanish version of "Slipping Through My Fingers")

Songs from The Singles: The First Ten Years (1982)

13. "The Day Before You Came"
14. "Cassandra"
15. "Under Attack"
16. "You Owe Me One"

=== CD 9: Rarities ===
1. "Waterloo" (Alternate mix)
2. "Medley: Pick a Bale of Cotton – On Top of Old Smokey – Midnight Special" (Original 1975 mix)
3. "Thank You for the Music" (Doris Day version)
4. "Summer Night City" (Full-length version)
5. "Lovelight" (Alternate mix)
6. "Dream World"
7. "Voulez-Vous" (Extended remix)
8. "On and on and On" (Full-length version)
9. "Put on Your White Sombrero"
10. "I Am the City"
11. "ABBA Undeleted: Scaramouche/Summer Night City/Take a Chance on Me/Baby/Just a Notion/Rikky Rock ’n’ Roller/Burning My Bridges/Fernando (Swedish version)/Here Comes Rubie Jamie/Hamlet III Parts 1 & 2/Free as a Bumble Bee/Rubber Ball Man/Crying Over You/Just Like That/Givin’ a Little Bit More"

=== DVD 1: The Videos ===
1. "Ring Ring"
2. "Waterloo"
3. "Mamma Mia"
4. "SOS"
5. "Bang-A-Boomerang"
6. "I Do, I Do, I Do, I Do, I Do"
7. "Fernando"
8. "Dancing Queen"
9. "Money, Money, Money"
10. "Knowing Me, Knowing You"
11. "That's Me"
12. "The Name of the Game"
13. "Take a Chance on Me"
14. "Eagle"
15. "One Man, One Woman"
16. "Thank You for the Music"
17. "Summer Night City"
18. "Chiquitita"
19. "Does Your Mother Know?"
20. "Voulez-Vous"
21. "Gimme! Gimme! Gimme! (A Man After Midnight)"
22. "I Have a Dream"
23. "Super Trouper"
24. "The Winner Takes It All"
25. "On and on and On"
26. "Happy New Year"
27. "Lay All Your Love on Me"
28. "Head Over Heels"
29. "When All Is Said and Done"
30. "One of Us"
31. "The Day Before You Came"
32. "Under Attack"

Bonus videos

33. "Estoy Soñando"
34. "Felicidad"
35. "No Hay a Quien Culpar"
36. "Dancing Queen" (1992 version)
37. "The Last Video"

=== DVD 2: "The History" and "Live in April 1981" ===
- The History
  - Documentary (originally appeared on ABBA Gold: Greatest Hits DVD)
- Live in April 1981
  - Selections from ABBA's final live concert, originally broadcast as part of the television special Dick Cavett Meets ABBA.
1. "Gimme! Gimme! Gimme! (A Man After Midnight)"
2. "Super Trouper"
3. "Two for the Price of One"
4. "Slipping Through My Fingers"
5. "On and on and On"

== Charts ==
Chart (2006–2008)	Peak position
Denmark (Tracklisten)	6
