= Frida ensam =

Studio album by Anni-Frid Lyngstad
- Released: 10 November 1975
- Recorded: 21 February 1974 – October 1975
- Studios: KMH and Metronome, Stockholm, Sweden
- Genres: Pop, folk rock
- Length: 43:42
- Label: Polar Music
- Producers: Benny Andersson; Björn Ulvaeus

Anni-Frid Lyngstad chronology
Anni-Frid Lyngstad (1972)	Frida ensam (1975)	Something's Going On (1982)

Singles from Frida Ensam
- 1. "Man Vill Ju Leva Lite Dessemellan" Released: August 1972; 2. "Fernando" Released: January 1976

Frida ensam (English: Frida Alone) is the second studio album by Swedish singer Anni-Frid Lyngstad. It was first released by Polar Music in 1975 while Lyngstad was a member of the pop group ABBA and produced by her then-fiancé and fellow ABBA member, Benny Andersson. The album has since been re-released several times, most significantly in remastered form in 2005 with bonus tracks. The lead song was the original version of "Fernando" sung in Swedish by Lyngstad, later popularised in its English version by ABBA. The album was a huge success in Sweden and was certified platinum.

== Background ==
Frida ensam was recorded in KMH Studio and mixed at Metronome Studio in Stockholm. Benny Andersson plays all the pianos and keyboards, while the rest of the musicians are very much the same team who played on ABBA's records. First recordings and preparations started in 1974 but, due to the rising popularity of ABBA, the album took over 18 months to complete and was recorded between sessions and promotion for the ABBA albums Waterloo and ABBA.

=== Content ===
Frida ensam opens with Lyngstad's Swedish solo version of "Fernando" which was not released as a single in Sweden, so that those who wanted it had to buy the album. (It was however released by Polar as a single in Norway but did not reach the charts there). The song was written so that the album would contain something unique and new. This was a song with a great hit potential (being practically a new ABBA song) and this clever decision led to the album selling 130,000 copies. The song became the most popular track on the album and it spent nine weeks at #1 on Svensktoppen (a chart of Swedish songs on Sveriges radio not based on sales). The English version recorded by ABBA became one of the group's biggest hits. The English version, with completely different lyrics by Björn Ulvaeus, presents a vision of nostalgia for two veterans reminiscing in old age about a lost battle in which they participated. "I wrote all the songs as little stories. "Fernando" was about two old freedom-fighters from the war between Texas and Mexico. I was lying outside one summer night, looking at the stars and it suddenly came to me". This quote indicates that an English version was always foreseen as the summer referred to must be the summer of 1975.

With the exception of "Fernando", all the other songs are cover versions, showing Lyngstad's and Andersson's fairly eclectic taste in music. Besides dramatic Italian ballads like "Anima Mia" and "Vado Via", the album includes Lyngstad's interpretations of 10cc's "The Wall Street Shuffle" and David Bowie's "Life on Mars", sixties hits like The Beach Boys' "Wouldn't It Be Nice" and Gary Puckett & The Union Gap's "Young Girl", the country and western ballad "The Most Beautiful Girl", "Send in the Clowns" from Stephen Sondheim's musical A Little Night Music as well as the Greek folk song "Siko Chorepse Syrtaki" and "Som en sparv" (with lyrics by Swedish poet Barbro Hörberg) originally recorded by Swedish band Wasa. The album received positive reviews both in Sweden and other countries. For example, British Melody Maker wrote: "The album portrays Frida as a very strong and emotive singer and shows the true value of the music, that if sung properly and with enough feeling it transcends all language barriers".

Lyrically, most of the tracks have a common theme, that of a strong and independent woman, hence the album title. The ironic lyrics of "Vill du låna en man" show a particularly emancipated Lyngstad: "Hi, would you like to borrow a man? He's one hell of a guy. His umbrella and slippers are included. – You'll have to be patient though, remember that he owns you – plus the three other women he sees on the side. – Are you ready to become the mother of someone who measures 2.02 in the buff? – When he's had his say, that's the way it is. When he's wrong he's right anyway. – Before you answer just make sure you can handle these children also known as men."

The hand-painted sleeve was deemed by one journalist to be "so sensual, it could make the Leaning Tower of Pisa stand to attention."

== Reception ==
Professional ratings
Review scores
Source	Rating
Allmusic	link

Frida ensam was a huge success in Sweden topping the album charts for six weeks and spending a total of 38 weeks in the charts. The Swedish version of "Fernando" topped the Svensktoppen radio chart for nine weeks.

== Reissue ==
A digitally remastered version of the album was released by Universal Music in 2005, including two bonus tracks; the A and B-sides of Lyngstad's debut single for the Polar Music label, both Italian schlager hits with Swedish lyrics by Stig Anderson and both produced by Andersson and Björn Ulvaeus. "Man vill ju leva lite dessemellan" was Frida's second Svensktoppen #1 in late 1972.

== Track listing ==
Side one

1. "Fernando" (Stikkan (Stig) Anderson, Benny Andersson, Björn Ulvaeus) – 4:14
2. "Jag är mig själv nu" ("Young Girl") (Jerry Fuller, Marie Bergman) – 3:05
3. "Som en sparv" (Jan Askelind, Barbro Hörberg) – 3:43
4. "Vill du låna en man?" ("The Most Beautiful Girl") (Norris Wilson, Rory Michael Bourke, Billy Sherrill, Anderson) – 2:45
5. "Liv på Mars?" ("Life on Mars?") (David Bowie, Owe Junsjö) – 3:48
6. "Syrtaki" ("Siko Chorepse Syrtaki") (Giorgos Zambetas, Alekos Sakellarios, Sam Lundwall) – 2:58

Side two

7. "Aldrig mej" ("Vado Via") (Enrico Riccardi, Luigi Albertelli, Anderson) – 4:06
8. "Guld och gröna ängar" ("The Wall Street Shuffle") (Eric Stewart, Graham Gouldman, Junsjö) – 3:41
9. "Ett liv i solen" ("Anima Mia") (Flavio Paulin, Ivano Michetti, Mats Paulson) – 3:53
10. "Skulle de' va' skönt" ("Wouldn't It Be Nice") (Brian Wilson, Tony Asher, Marie Bergman) – 3:17
11. "Var är min clown?" ("Send in the Clowns") (Stephen Sondheim, Mats Paulson) – 4:22

CD – 2005 'Bonusspår' (Remastered album, with two additional songs)

12. "Man vill ju leva lite dessemellan" ("Chi Salta Il Fosso") (Vittorio Tariciotti, Marcello Marrocchi, Franca Evangelisti, Anderson) – 2:53
13. "Ska man skratta eller gråta?" ("Principessa") (Gianfranco Baldazzi, Sergio Bardotti, Rosalino Cellamare, Anderson) – 3:51

== Personnel ==
- Anni-Frid Lyngstad – lead vocals
- Benny Andersson – piano, keyboards
- Björn Ulvaeus – acoustic guitar
- Rutger Gunnarsson – bass guitar, acoustic guitar, mandolin, bouzouki ("Syrtaki")
- Roger Palm – drums
- Ola Brunkert – drums ("Fernando")
- Janne Schaffer – electric guitar
- Lasse Wellander – electric guitar ("Fernando"), acoustic guitar
- Anders Glenmark – electric guitar ("Skulle de' va' skönt" and "Ett liv i solen")
- Malando Gassama – congas
- Inger Öst – backing vocals
- Lasse Holm – backing vocals
- Lasse Westmann – backing vocals
- Liza Öhman – backing vocals ("Aldrig mej" and "Vill du låna en man?")
- Lasse Carlsson – backing vocals ("Aldrig mej" and "Vill du låna en man?")
- Janne Kling – flute ("Fernando")
- Janne Lindgren – steel guitar ("Vill du låna en man?")

== Production staff ==
- Benny Andersson – producer ("Fernando" produced by Andersson and Björn Ulvaeus)
- Sven Olof Walldoff – string arrangements
- Recorded at KMH Studios by Lennart Karlsmyr and Åke Grahn
- "Fernando" and "Var är min clown?" recorded at Metronome Studios by Michael B. Tretow and Rune Persson
- Mixed at Metronome Studios by Persson, Janne Hansson and Michael B. Tretow
- "Aldrig Mej" and "Syrtaki" mixed at KMH Studios by Lennart Karlsmyr
- Ola Lager – photography
- Rune Söderqvist – design

== Sources ==
- Liner notes, Carl Magnus Palm: Frida ensam (2005 re-issue). Universal Music.
- Wille Wendt: Topplistan – The Official Swedish Single & Album Charts, Premium Förlag 1993, ISBN 91-971894-2-1
