= I Cugini di Campagna =

Italian band

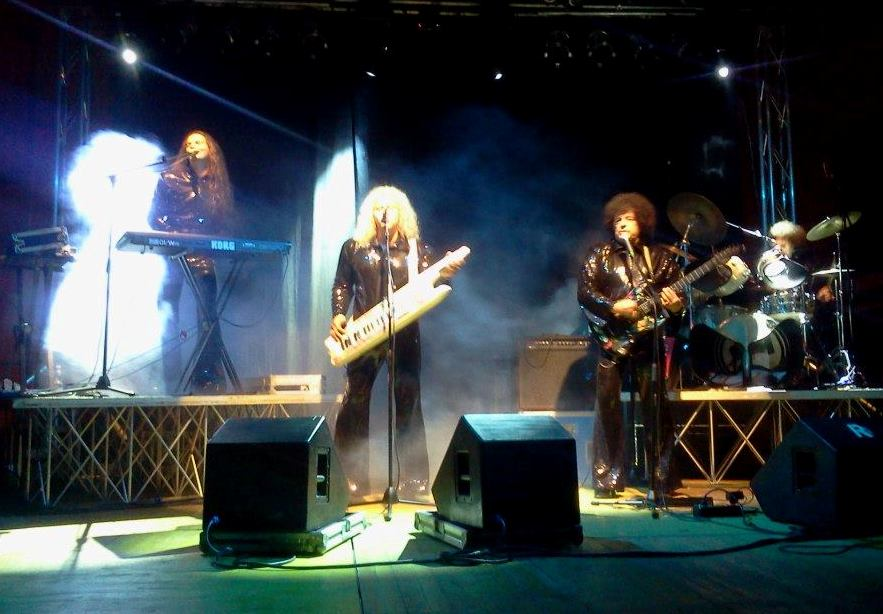

Background information
- Origin: Rome, Italy
- Genres: Dance-pop, easy listening, pop rock
- Years active: 1970–present
- Members: Silvano Michetti; Ivano Michetti; Tiziano Leonardi; Nick Luciani
- Past members: Flavio Paulin; Giorgio Brandi; Paul Manners; Gianni Fiori; Marco Occhetti; Luca Storelli; Daniel Colangeli
- Website: www.cuginidicampagna.com

I Cugini di Campagna ("The Countryside Cousins") is an Italian pop band formed in 1970 in Rome. They are well known for their use of falsetto, as well as for their eccentric look (a cross between glam and kitsch).

== Background ==
The band achieved some success with its first single, "Il ballo di Peppe", that was launched by the radio-program Alto Gradimento in 1970. In 1973 the band gained more success with the song "Anima mia", then they achieved a series of commercial hits until the early eighties. After a difficult period the band resurfaced in 1997, with a new lineup, thanks to the RAI TV-show Anima mia, whose success lead to the rediscovery of their eponymous song and the band as a whole.

"Anima mia" was covered by numerous artists, including ABBA singer Anni-Frid Lyngstad (as "Ett liv i solen", included in her album Frida ensam), Dalida, Bobby Rydell, Claudio Baglioni, Piergiorgio Farina, Gianni Meccia.

Since then, Cugini di Campagna have produced a series of albums, containing both re-arranged versions of their earlier hits as well as new material.

On 4 December 2022, it was officially announced their participation in the Sanremo Music Festival 2023. "Lettera 22" was later announced as their entry for the Sanremo Music Festival 2023.

== Members ==
=== Current members ===
- Ivano Michetti (1970–present) - guitar
- Silvano Michetti (1970–present) - drums
- Tiziano Leonardi (2012–present) - bass
- Nick Luciani (1994–2014; 2021–present), vocals

=== Former members ===
- Flavio Paulin (1970–1977) - vocals
- Gianni Fiori (1970–1972) - keyboards
- Giorgio Brandi (1973–1996) - keyboards
- Paul Manners (1978–1986) - vocals
- Marco Occhetti, aka Kim (1986–1994) - vocals
- Luca Storelli (1997–2011) - keyboards
- Daniel Colangeli (2015–2021) - vocals

== Discography ==
Selected singles

- 1970 – "Il ballo di Peppe"
- 1972 – "Un letto e una coperta"/"L'uva è nera"
- 1973 – "Anima mia"
- 1974 – "Innamorata"
- 1974 – "Un'altra donna"
- 1975 – "64 anni"
- 1975 – "Preghiera"
- 1976 – "È lei"
- 1977 – "Conchiglia bianca"
- 1977 – "Tu sei tu"
- 1978 – "Dentro l'anima"
- 1979 – "Meravigliosamente"
- 1980 – "No tu no"
- 1981 – "Valeria"
- 1982 – "Uomo mio"
- 1985 – "Che cavolo d'amore"
- 1998 – "Amor mio"
- 2002 – "Vita della mia vita"
- 2006 – "Sapessi quanto"
- 2011 – "Mi manchi tu"
- 2023 – "Lettera 22"
