= Anima mia =

Single by Cugini di campagna
- B-side: "Te la dico"
- Released: 1973
- Genre: Pop
- Label: Pull
- Songwriters: Antonello De Sanctis; Flavio Paulin; Ivano Michetti

Cugini di campagna singles chronology
"Un letto e una coperta" (1972)	"Anima mia" (1973)	"Innamorata" (1974)

Audio
- "Anima mia" on YouTube

"Anima mia" is a 1973 song composed by Antonello De Sanctis, Flavio Paulin and Ivano Michetti and performed by the musical group Cugini di campagna. The first top ten hit in the band's career, the song received an additional gold disc in 1997, when it was named on a nostalgia-based Rai 2 variety show presented by Fabio Fazio and Claudio Baglioni.

"Anima mia" has been covered by numerous artists, including ABBA singer Anni-Frid Lyngstad (as "Ett liv i solen" (A life in the sun), on her album Frida ensam), Dalida, Bobby Rydell, Claudio Baglioni, Piergiorgio Farina and Gianni Meccia.

== Track listing ==
7" single – QSP 1004

1. "Anima mia" (Antonello De Sanctis, Flavio Paulin, Ivano Michetti)
2. "Te la dico" (Bruno Zambrini, Gianni Meccia)

== Charts ==
Chart	Peak position
Italy	2
