= Another Town, Another Train =

1973 single by ABBA

- Sleeve of Japanese release

Single by ABBA

from the album Ring Ring
- B-side: "People Need Love"
- Released: 6 Apr 1973
- Recorded: Late 1972 to early 1973
- Studio: KMH Studios
- Genre: Folk-pop
- Length: 3:13
- Label: Polar Music
- Songwriters: Benny Andersson; Björn Ulvaeus
- Producers: Benny Andersson; Björn Ulvaeus

ABBA singles chronology
"Ring Ring" (1973)	"Another Town, Another Train" (1973)	"Love Isn't Easy (But It Sure Is Hard Enough)" (1973)

Audio video
- "Another Town, Another Train" on YouTube

"Another Town, Another Train" is a song recorded by Swedish pop group ABBA at KMH Studios.

The song was released as a 7" vinyl single in Japan in March 1973 to promote the group's debut album Ring Ring; the single was also released with the same B-side ("People Need Love") in Venezuela. "Another Town, Another Train" was also released as a single on Playboy Records in the USA, with "I Am Just A Girl" on the B-side, as a follow-up to the group's first single "People Need Love". The single was released in South Africa and Rhodesia on the Sunshine label with "Rock'n Roll Band" on the B-side. After the success of the Ring Ring single, it was the intention for "Another Town, Another Train" to be released as a follow-up single in Holland which never materialised. The first release in the UK was on Abba's first compilation album Greatest Hits.

Written and performed in the style of Simon and Garfunkel and The Bachelors, the melodic ballad tells of the song's narrator leaving his love as "day is dawning". It was recorded in German under the title "Wer im Wartesaal der Liebe steht" (with lyrics by Fred Jay), as the B-side to the German version of "Ring Ring". With lyrics in Swedish by Stikkan Andersson, "En annan stad, en annan vän", it was covered by dance band Schytts in 1974, and by fellow Eurovision participant Kikki Danielsson in 1991 on her album "Vägen hem till dej".

== Official versions ==
- "Another Town, Another Train" (English version)
- "Wer im Wartesaal der Liebe steht" (German version)

== Charts ==
Chart (1973–1974)	Peak position
Rhodesia (Lyons Maid)	18
Sweden (Tio i Topp)	2

== Release history ==
Region	Date	Title	Label	Format	Catalog	Reference
USA	6 Apr 1973	"Another Town, Another Train" / "I Am Just A Girl"	Playboy Records	7-inch vinyl	P 50018	
USA	6 Apr 1973	"Another Town, Another Train" / "Another Town, Another Train"	Playboy Records	7-inch vinyl, promo	P 50018	
Japan	1973	"Another Town, Another Train" / "People Need Love"	Philips	7-inch vinyl	SFL-1796	
Venezuela	1973	"Another Town, Another Train" / "People Need Love"	RCA Victor	7-inch vinyl	45.496	
South Africa	Feb 1974	"Another Town, Another Train" / "Rock & Roll Band"	Sunshine	7-inch vinyl	SUN 4	
