= Chi salta il fosso =

Song by Loretta Goggi

"Chi Salta Il Fosso"

Single by Loretta Goggi

from the album Vieni Via Con Me
- Language: Italian
- English title: Who takes the plunge
- B-side: "Pun Tan Tai"
- Released: 15 May 1972
- Genre: Italian pop
- Length: 2:56
- Label: Durium
- Songwriters: Vittorio Tariciotti, Marcello Marrocchi, Franca Evangelisti

Loretta Goggi singles chronology
"Cico And Bum" (1971)	"Chi Salta Il Fosso" (1972)	"Vieni Via Con Me (Taratapunzi-e...)" (1972)

"Chi salta il fosso" is a single first released by Italian singer Loretta Goggi.

== Anni-Frid Lyngstad cover ==
"Man Vill Ju Leva Lite Dessemellan"

Single by Anni-Frid Lyngstad

from the album Frida Ensam (2005 reissue) and Ring Ring (2013 Deluxe Edition)
- Language: Swedish
- English title: You want to live a little in between
- B-side: "Ska Man Skratta Eller Gråta"
- Released: August 1972
- Length: 2:51
- Label: Polar
- Songwriters: Vittorio Tariciotti, Marcello Marrocchi, Franca Evangelisti, Stig Anderson

Anni-Frid Lyngstad singles chronology
"People Need Love" (1972)	"Man Vill Ju Leva Lite Dessemellan" (1972)	"Fernando" (1976)

The song gained the attention for Polar Music and ABBA manager Stig Anderson. By 1972, Anni-Frid Lyngstad’s contract with EMI had ended and Frida recorded her first song recorded under Polar Music: a Swedish-language version, titled Man Vill Ju Leva Lite Dessemellan (translation: You want to live a little in between).

== Release ==
The song became a hit in Sweden and spent 10 weeks in the Svenkstoppen, spending 3 weeks at the top in October 1972. "Man Vill Ju Leva Lite Dessemellan" appeared as a bonus track on the 2005 reissue of Frida Ensam along with its B-Side "Ska man skratta eller gråta?" as well as the deluxe edition of the ABBA debut album Ring Ring.

== Charts ==
Chart (1972)	Peak position
Svenkstoppen	1
