= Ring Ring (album) =

1973 studio album by ABBA

Studio album by Björn & Benny, Agnetha & Frida
- Released: 26 March 1973
- Recorded: November – December 1969 ("She's My Kind of Girl"); 29 March 1972, 26 September 1972 – 16 March 1973
- Studios: Europafilm, Metronome, and KMH, Stockholm
- Genres: Europop; folk-pop
- Length: 35:51
- Label: Polar
- Producers: Benny Andersson; Björn Ulvaeus

Björn & Benny, Agnetha & Frida chronology
Ring Ring (1973)	Waterloo (1974)

Björn & Benny chronology
Lycka (1970)	Ring Ring (1973)	Waterloo (1974)

Singles from Ring Ring
- 1. "People Need Love" Released: 1 June 1972; 2. "He Is Your Brother" Released: 22 November 1972; 3. "Ring ring (bara du slog en signal)" Released: 14 February 1973; 4. "Ring Ring (English Version)" Released: 19 February 1973; 5. "Another Town, Another Train" Released: March 1973; 6. "I Am Just a Girl" Released: May 1973 (Japan only); 7. "Love Isn't Easy (But It Sure Is Hard Enough)" Released: June 1973; 8. "Rock'n Roll Band" Released: July 1973; 9. "Ring Ring (German Version)" Released: 10 August 1973; 10. "Nina, Pretty Ballerina" Released: 6 October 1973

Professional ratings
Review scores
Source	Rating
AllMusic	2.5/5 stars
The Encyclopedia of Popular Music	2/5 stars
The New Rolling Stone Album Guide	3/5 stars
Ondarock	5/10
Spin Alternative Record Guide	4/10

Ring Ring is the debut studio album by the Swedish group ABBA, initially credited as Björn & Benny, Agnetha & Frida. It was released in Scandinavia on 26 March 1973, and later in a limited number of other territories, including West Germany, Australia, South Africa and Mexico, through Polar Music. It reached the top ten in Australia, Norway, and Sweden. The album was re-released in Australasia in 1975, but was not released in the United Kingdom until 1992, and the United States until 1995.

== Overview ==
When the group's first recording "People Need Love" was recorded in the spring of 1972, the group was just one of many projects the four members were involved in. Only after the title track, "Ring Ring", became a hit, did the four decide to go on working together on permanent basis.

While the original 1973 Polar version of the album opens with the Swedish "Ring ring (bara du slog en signal)", the English-language version was placed as track four on side two. The international editions open with the English version. Filling its original slot (in mono) is "She's My Kind of Girl", a track originally recorded by Björn & Benny in 1969 for the Swedish soft porn film Inga II: the Seduction of Inga. Released as a single in 1970, it became a hit in Japan, and was also released as the B-side of the English version of the "Ring Ring" single in Scandinavia. The track "Disillusion" was co-written by Björn Ulvaeus and Agnetha Fältskog. Although Fältskog had composed much of her solo output prior to ABBA, "Disillusion" is the only song released on an ABBA studio album to feature a songwriting contribution from her. "Disillusion" would later appear with Swedish lyrics on Fältskog's solo album Elva kvinnor i ett hus.

Ring Ring was first released on CD in 1988. Polar Music released in Scandinavia, alongside Waterloo and ABBA's self titled album, the version with the running order of the original Scandinavian LP. This is the only CD issue of this album to do so. The same year in Australia, Rainbow Music Group issued the international version on CD. In 1990, the international version of the album was released on CD throughout Europe by Polydor Records.

In the United Kingdom, Ring Ring was first issued on 7 September 1992, on cassette, and on CD the following year. In the United States, the album was not available until 1995 when it was released there on CD by Polydor. The album has been remastered on CD multiple times: in 1997 as part of "The ABBA Remasters" series, in 2001 with an updated cover artwork and some bonus tracks, in 2005 as part of The Complete Studio Recordings box set, and in 2013 as a "Deluxe Edition".

On 19 May 2023, a collection of vinyl products was released to celebrate Ring Ring's 50th anniversary: a double-LP edition of the album, pressed on 180g black vinyl and half-speed mastered by Miles Showell at Abbey Road Studios; a 7-inch box set of five of the album's singles, pressed on colored vinyl; and 7-inch picture discs of each of these singles.

== Deluxe edition ==
On 14 October 2013, Ring Ring was reissued as a deluxe edition for its 40th anniversary. It was released as a CD and DVD set, alongside a 20-page illustrated booklet with an essay on the making of the album.

The CD consisted of the original album, expanded with thirteen bonus tracks and featuring: "Man vill ju leva lite dessemellan", a 1972 hit for Frida, with backing vocals from the other ABBA members; The 1970 recording "There’s A Little Man", which features backing vocals from Agnetha and marks her first contribution to a song written and produced by Björn and Benny; "En hälsning till våra parkarrangörer", a 1972 spoken-word promotional single, in which all members promote their 1973 Sweden tour; rare original versions of tracks like "I Am Just a Girl" and "I Saw It In The Mirror"; among other tracks.

The DVD featured the "International Sleeve Gallery" and contained the following television content: a performance of "People Need Love" from SVT's Vi i femman; one of "Ring Ring" from ORF's Spotlight; and a 2012 Swedish report where Benny talks about the album's creation, titled "Ring Ring revealed" from Låtarna som förändrade musiken, on UR.

== Track listing ==
Based on the original Swedish release. All tracks are written by Benny Andersson and Björn Ulvaeus, except where noted.

Side one
No.	Title	Writer(s)	Length
1.	"Ring ring (bara du slog en signal)"	Andersson; Stig Anderson; Ulvaeus	3:10
2.	"Another Town, Another Train"		3:12
3.	"Disillusion"	Agnetha Fältskog; Ulvaeus	3:03
4.	"People Need Love"		2:45
5.	"I Saw It in the Mirror"		2:33
6.	"Nina, Pretty Ballerina"		2:51

Side two
No.	Title	Writer(s)	Length
1.	"Love Isn't Easy (But It Sure Is Hard Enough)"		2:54
2.	"Me and Bobby and Bobby's Brother"		2:50
3.	"He Is Your Brother"		3:18
4.	"Ring Ring" (English version)	Andersson; Anderson; Ulvaeus; Neil Sedaka; Phil Cody	3:05
5.	"I Am Just a Girl"	Andersson; Anderson; Ulvaeus	3:01
6.	"Rock'n Roll Band"		3:09
Total length:			35:51

The album's international edition replaces the Swedish version of "Ring Ring" with the English version and features "She's My Kind of Girl" as track 4 on side two.

=== Deluxe edition ===
Released for the album's 40th anniversary, this edition also features "Ring ring (bara du slog en signal)" as a bonus track. Its B-side, "Åh, vilka tider", was not included in this edition, but could be found on The Complete Studio Recordings.

All tracks are written by Benny Andersson and Björn Ulvaeus, except where noted.

Bonus tracks
No.	Title	Writer(s)	Length
13.	"Ring ring (bara du slog en signal) (Swedish Version)" (B-side of "Åh, vilka tider")	Andersson; Stig Anderson; Ulvaeus	3:09
14.	"Merry-Go-Round" (B-side of "People Need Love")	Andersson; Stig Anderson; Ulvaeus	3:24
15.	"Santa Rosa" (B-side of "He Is Your Brother")	Andersson; Anderson; Ulvaeus	2:59
16.	"Ring ring" (Spanish version)	Andersson; Anderson; Ulvaeus; Doris Band	3:00
17.	"Wer im Wartesaal der Liebe steht" (German version of "Another Town, Another Train"; B-side of the German version of "Ring Ring")	Andersson; Ulvaeus; Fred Jay	3:21
18.	"Ring Ring" (German version)	Andersson; Anderson; Ulvaeus; Peter Lach	3:09
19.	"En hälsning till våra parkarrangörer" (1972 spoken-word promotional single for the band's 1973 Sweden tour, with excerpts of recent hits; previously unreleased)		2:26

Extra bonus tracks - early versions
No.	Title	Writer(s)	Length
20.	"Hej gamle man!" (performed by Björn & Benny; from Lycka)		3:21
21.	"There's a Little Man" (performed by Billy G-Son)		2:45
22.	"I Saw It in the Mirror" (performed by Billy G-Son)		2:20
23.	"Jag är blott en man" (performed by Jarl Kulle)	Andersson; Anderson; Ulvaeus	3:04
24.	"Man vill ju leva lite dessemellan" (performed by Anni-Frid Lyngstad)	Vittorio Tariciotti; Marcello Marrocchi; Franca Evangelisti; Anderson	2:53
25.	"Välkommen till världen" (performed by Lill-Babs)		3:19

== Personnel ==
Adapted from the liner notes of the original Swedish album release and AllMusic.

ABBA

- Agnetha Fältskog – lead vocals (3, 11), co-lead vocals, backing vocals
- Anni-Frid Lyngstad – lead vocals (8), co-lead vocals, backing vocals
- Björn Ulvaeus – guitar, acoustic guitar, lead vocals (2, 5, 7, 12), co-lead vocals, backing vocals
- Benny Andersson – piano, keyboards, mellotron, co-lead vocals, backing vocals

Additional musicians

- Janne Schaffer – acoustic guitar, electric guitar
- Rutger Gunnarsson – electric bass
- Mike Watson – electric bass
- Ola Brunkert – drums
- Roger Palm – drums ( track 12 )

Production

- Benny Andersson; Björn Ulvaeus – producers
- Michael B. Tretow – engineer
- Åke Eldsäter; Rune Persson; Lennart Karlsmyr (KMH); Björn Almstedt (Europafilm) – assistant engineers
- Sven-Olof Walldoff – string arrangements (11)
- Bengt H. Malmqvist – front cover photography
- Lars Falk – back cover photography
- Peter Wiking – layout, art direction
- Jon Astley; Michael B. Tretow – remastering

== Charts ==
Chart (1973–76)	Peak position
Australian Albums (Kent Music Report)	10
New Zealand Albums (RMNZ)	32
Norwegian Albums (VG-lista)	10
Swedish Albums Chart	2
Chart (2023–24)	Peak position
German Albums (Offizielle Top 100)	29
Greek Albums (IFPI)	20

== Certifications and sales ==
Region	Certification	Certified units/sales
Australia (ARIA)	3× Platinum	150,000^{^}
Norway	—	10,000
Sweden	—	116,627
^{^} Shipments figures based on certification alone.
