= Nina, Pretty Ballerina =

- Austrian picture sleeve

Single by ABBA

from the album Ring Ring
- A-side: "He Is Your Brother" (France); "So Long" (Philippines)
- B-side: "I Am Just a Girl" (Austria); "Dance (While the Music Still Goes On)" (Kenya)
- Released: October 1973 (France) 1974 (Austria) 1977 (Kenya, Philippines)
- Genre: Europop
- Length: 2:53
- Label: Polar Music, Polydor Records, Atlantic Records
- Songwriters: Benny Andersson; Björn Ulvaeus
- Producers: Benny Andersson; Björn Ulvaeus

ABBA singles chronology
"I Am Just a Girl" (1973)	"Nina, Pretty Ballerina" (1973)	"Waterloo" (1974)

Audio video
- "Nina, Pretty Ballerina" on YouTube

"Nina, Pretty Ballerina" is a song recorded in November 1972 by Swedish pop group ABBA and released on their debut album Ring Ring.

== Background ==
"Nina, Pretty Ballerina" is a third-person story song written by Benny Andersson and Björn Ulvaeus. The song describes a mundane lifestyle of a young woman who works at an office, but on a Friday night, she transforms and lives her dream on the dancefloor.

The initial recording took place on 17 October 1972 alongside "He Is Your Brother" in Europa Film Studios, Stockholm, but the result of this song was unsatisfactory. The song was re-recorded on 2 November 1972 at KMH Studio in Stockholm, where three of the tracks on Ring Ring were recorded. This is considered to be the first ABBA song to have the ABBA sound, where Agnetha Fältskog and Frida Lyngstad have lead vocals in unison.

Several sound effects are used including a train whistle and cheering. Andersson and sound engineer Michael B. Tretow pioneered a technique similar to Vari-speed, where the song tape had been slowed down and the piano score had been overlaid. With the song back in the original speed, this resulted in the instrument being sped up, so fast that it would not be possible to play.

"Nina, Pretty Ballerina" was released on 7" vinyl record in France in October 1973 without any chart success. After radio success in Austria, the song was released in February 1974, serving as the seventh and final single from the band's debut album Ring Ring. The single reached #8 on the singles chart in Austria.

== Personnel ==
- Agnetha Fältskog – lead and backing vocals
- Anni-Frid Lyngstad – lead and backing vocals
- Björn Ulvaeus – electric guitar and backing vocals
- Benny Andersson – piano and backing vocals

=== Additional musicians ===
- Ola Brunkert – drums
- Rutger Gunnarsson – bass
- Janne Schaffer – electric guitar

== Charts ==
Chart (1973)	Peak position
Austria (Ö3 Austria Top 40)	8

== Release history ==
Region	Date	Title	Label	Format	Catalog
France	Oct 1973	"Nina, Pretty Ballerina" / "He Is Your Brother"	Vogue	7-inch vinyl	45. X. 3027
Austria	1974	"Nina, Pretty Ballerina" / "I Am Just A Girl"	Polydor	7-inch vinyl	2040 111
Kenya	1977	"Nina, Pretty Ballerina" / "Dance (While The Music Still Goes On)"	Polydor	7-inch vinyl	2001 736
Philippines	1977	"Nina, Pretty Ballerina" / "So Long"	Polydor	7-inch vinyl	PRO-3512 (2001 741)

== Covers ==
- The song was covered in Swedish, titled "Nina Fina Ballerina," in 1974 by several groups including Jigs, Sewes and singer Dick Zetterlund. The version by Sewes reached number 5 in the Svensktoppen charts on 27 October 1974.
