= I Am Just a Girl =

Single by Björn & Benny, Agnetha & Anni-Frid

from the album Ring Ring
- B-side: "Ring Ring"
- Released: September 1973
- Length: 3:01
- Label: Philips
- Songwriters: Benny Andersson; Stig Anderson; Björn Ulvaeus
- Producers: Benny Andersson; Björn Ulvaeus

ABBA singles chronology
"Rock'n Roll Band" (1973)	"I Am Just a Girl" (1973)	"Nina, Pretty Ballerina" (1973)

Audio video
- "I Am Just a Girl" on YouTube

"I Am Just a Girl" is a song by the Swedish recording group ABBA (then known as Björn & Benny, Agnetha & Anni-Frid) recorded for their debut album Ring Ring (1973). It was released in 1973 as a Japanese-exclusive single via Philips Records.

== Background ==
"I Am Just a Girl" was originally written by Björn Ulvaeus, Benny Andersson and Stig Anderson in Swedish language, titled "Jag är blott en man". This version was recorded by Jarl Kulle and released as a single in November 1972. The song served as the theme tune from the movie "Ture Sventon".

The song was later recorded by Björn & Benny, Agnetha & Anni-Frid in English language using the same backing track. The song was released on ABBA’s debut album Ring Ring on 26 March 1973 and as a B-side to several singles internationally including "Love Isn't Easy (But It Sure Is Hard Enough)" in Denmark, "Another Town, Another Train" in the USA, "Ring Ring" in South Africa and "Nina, Pretty Ballerina" in Austria. The song spent three weeks in Swedish chart Tio i topp and peaked at number six.

"I Am Just a Girl" was released in Japan as a single in September 1973. The single was used to promote the upcoming album Ring Ring, released in December 1973 in an unusual way. Nippon Phonogram/Philips launched a photo contest, inviting the public to submit photos to be used for the cover of the album. With the theme of "I Am Just a Girl", the public had to submit colour photos. With 20-30 photos submitted everyday, the successful candidates were allegedly presented with cassette recorders, watches, badges and records.

== Critical reception ==
Hans Fridlund of Swedish tabloid newspaper Expressen said the song "has a sweet sing-along friendly melody".

Abba - Uncensored on the Record said, "ABBA with trumpets and other horns - something they were to do way better in years to come however". "Not one of ABBA’s finest moments"

== Track listing ==
Japanese 7-inch single

1. "I Am Just a Girl"
2. "Ring Ring" (Despite the Swedish version being labeled on the sleeve, the English version is the one that is played instead.)

== Charts ==
Chart (1973)	Peak position
Sweden (Tio i topp)	6
