= Disillusion (song) =

Song by ABBA

from the album Ring Ring
- Released: 1973
- Recorded: 1973
- Genre: Pop
- Length: 3:04
- Label: Polar
- Composer: Agnetha Fältskog
- Lyricist: Björn Ulvaeus
- Producers: Benny Andersson & Björn Ulvaeus

Audio video
- "Disillusion" on YouTube

"Disillusion" is a ballad by the pop group ABBA, on their first album Ring Ring (1973). It is notable as the only song ABBA recorded and released on a studio album to have a songwriting credit from Agnetha Fältskog. She was a songwriter as well as a singer, and had dabbled in that in her pre-ABBA career. She wrote the music, with lyrics added by fellow ABBA member and then-husband Björn Ulvaeus.

== Overview ==
Although she wrote several Swedish top 40 hits during her solo career, Fältskog did not feel her compositions were suitable for ABBA's albums. However, although this is her only songwriting credit to appear on an ABBA album, she also co-wrote a song that ABBA performed in concert, "I'm Still Alive"; recordings of this often appear in bootlegs. The song itself is a folk-pop based ballad somewhat similar to her pre-ABBA solo work.

The track has "sparse instrumentation". This differs from the Swedish version she recorded for her 1975 solo album Elva kvinnor i ett hus (Eleven Women In One House). The song was produced by Fältskog and entitled "Mina Ögon"; it was "far more ambitious".
