= My Mama Said =

Song by ABBA

from the album Waterloo
- A-side: "Honey, Honey"
- Released: 4 March 1974
- Genre: Pop
- Length: 3:14
- Label: Polar
- Songwriters: Benny Andersson & Björn Ulvaeus
- Producers: Benny Andersson & Björn Ulvaeus

Audio video
- "My Mama Said" on YouTube

"My Mama Said" is a song by ABBA, released on their 1974 album Waterloo. It was written by Benny Andersson and Björn Ulvaeus. The song was also released as the B-side to Honey, Honey in Poland.

== Synopsis ==
The song is about a girl's grumbles over her overbearing mother.

== Composition ==
The song has dual vocals by both Frida and Agnetha. The song has an R&B feel, as well as a "sophisticated refrain and middle eight guitar solo", which were most likely influenced by the music of the time. The bass guitar links the vocal phrases in the verses. The chorus has a bass guitar and acoustic guitar playing the same notes an octave apart, while the keyboard is played in a chord-per-bar fashion. The verses have a "chant-like plea" while the choruses have a "defiant masculinity". The vocal lines are cut short so as to eradicate any vibrato, and the vocals have been treated in post-production

== Critical reception ==
Bright Lights Dark Shadows: The Real Story of Abba says the song has a "jazzy, almost funky feel, lending it an aura of coolness". Said there is a "nice little intro to this one and a clever little bit of jazz playing from Janne Schaffer". Don't Play with My Balls! says "My Mama Said has everything you could want in a tune" including "big fat bass" and "passive aggressive parenting". The sound of the suburbs described the song as "oddly neglected", and added that one can almost hear the early signs of famous ABBA sound fall into place. ABBA: let the music speak said the song is "unfortunately one of those ABBA songs that earned a reputation more for its lyrical triteness than its musical substance", arguing that the need to continue the rhyming structure ended up "belittling a track that succeeds on all other levels".
