= Ring Ring (ABBA song) =

"Ring Ring (Bara du slog en signal)"
- Original label of the Swedish release

Single by Bjorn & Benny, Agnetha & Frida (ABBA)

from the album Ring Ring
- B-side: "Åh vilka tider (Svensk Version)" (Swedish-language release); "She's My Kind of Girl" (English-language release)
- Released: 14 February 1973
- Recorded: 10 January 1973
- Studio: Metronome, Stockholm, Sweden
- Genre: Pop rock
- Length: 3:00
- Label: Polar (Sweden); Epic (UK); Atlantic (US)
- Songwriters: Benny Andersson; Björn Ulvaeus; Stig Anderson; Neil Sedaka/Phil Cody (English lyrics); Peter Lach (German lyrics); Doris Band (Spanish lyrics)
- Producers: Benny Andersson; Björn Ulvaeus

Bjorn & Benny, Agnetha & Frida (ABBA) singles chronology
"He Is Your Brother" (1972)	"Ring Ring (Bara du slog en signal)" (1973)	"Another Town, Another Train" (1973)

Music video
- Ring Ring on YouTube

Alternative release
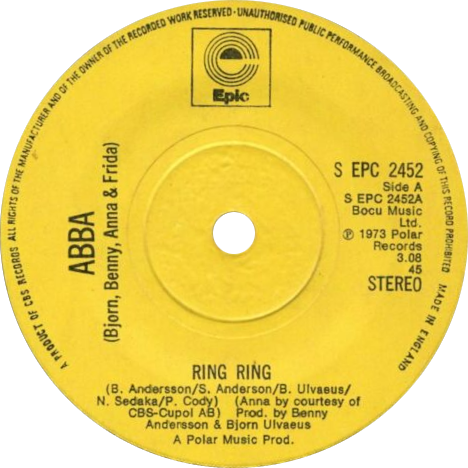
- 1974 UK remix single label of the English version

"Ring Ring (Bara du slog en signal)", in English: "Ring Ring (If only you called)", titled simply as "Ring Ring" in the English single version, is a song by Swedish group ABBA, released as the title track of their 1973 debut album.

The single gave the group their big break in several European countries (although the rest of Europe, North America and Australia would be introduced to ABBA the following year). The song was written in Swedish by Benny Andersson and Björn Ulvaeus, along with their manager Stig Anderson, with the original title of "Ring Ring (Bara du slog en signal)" ("Ring Ring (If Only You Called)"). As in other languages, the English translation (helped by Neil Sedaka and his collaborator Phil Cody) showed notable changes in the original lyrics but with a similar meaning, including a new chorus: "Ring, ring, why don't you give me a call?". The Swedish version reached No. 1 in the Swedish charts.

"Ring Ring" tells of a lover waiting alone by the telephone for the object of her desire to call.

== History ==
After the success of "People Need Love" in 1972 by Björn & Benny, Agnetha & Anni-Frid (as the group was then known), the group's manager, Stig Anderson, realised the potential of coupling the vocal talents of the women with the writing talents of the men. It was then decided that the quartet would record an LP. This eventually turned out to be the album Ring Ring.

Andersson, Ulvaeus and Anderson were invited to enter a song into Melodifestivalen 1973, whose winner would represent Sweden in the Eurovision Song Contest 1973. After several days, Andersson and Ulvaeus came up with the music for the Swedish version of "Ring Ring", with the working title "Klocklåt" (Clock Tune). Anderson wrote the lyrics with the intention of making a pop-oriented song, trying to remove the pomp and circumstance surrounding the Eurovision Song Contest at the time.

After this, the song was retitled "Ring Ring". To make it more accessible to a universal audience, Anderson asked American songwriter Neil Sedaka to pen the lyrics for an English version. Sedaka was estranged from his lyricist Howard Greenfield at the time but, with the help of his then-current lyricist Phil Cody (who did not usually write in that style), wrote a set of English lyrics. Record World said that the lyrics co-penned by Sedaka "[deal] with a cold relationship and a silent telephone."

On 10 January 1973, the song was recorded at the Metronome Studio in Stockholm. Studio engineer Michael B. Tretow, who later collaborated with Andersson and Ulvaeus on many singles and albums, had read a book about record producer Phil Spector (Richard Williams' book Out of His Head: The Sound of Phil Spector), famed for his "Wall of Sound" treatment to the songs that he produced. While Spector used several musicians playing the same instruments in the same recording studio at the same time, such a technique would be far too expensive for the recording of "Ring Ring". Tretow's solution was to simply record the song's backing track twice in order to achieve an orchestral sound. Changing the speed of the tape between the overdubs, making the instruments marginally out of tune, increased the effect. This was unlike anything that had been done before in Swedish music. The riff bears similarities to Giorgio Moroder’s song "Underdog", also released on the Polar label in 1972.

When ABBA performed "Ring Ring" in the Swedish Eurovision selection competition on 10 February 1973, it was a simpler version arranged by Lars Samuelson and backed by his orchestra, losing the "wall of sound" production sound. The song finished third. Nevertheless, when the studio recording of the song was released it fared much better in the Swedish charts, both in its Swedish and English language incarnations, hitting No. 1 and No. 2 respectively.

Throughout 1973, Stig Anderson secured deals with international record labels, as a result of interest in the group. Anderson attempted to secure deals with several British record companies (including Decca, EMI, Polydor, Pye and WEA) without any success. Anderson secured a one-off deal with RCA Records to release "Ring Ring" in Australia. Anderson contacted former member of The Zombies and employee of CBS, Paul Atkinson, who convinced the boss of CBS, Dick Asher to release "Ring Ring" under the Epic label with the group using the newly coined group name ABBA in October 1973.

The quartet then decided that performing as a group was a serious and realistic idea. They toured Sweden, and despite the failure of "Ring Ring" to represent the country at the 1973 Eurovision Song Contest, they began to prepare themselves for Melodifestivalen 1974 with "Waterloo".

== Reception ==
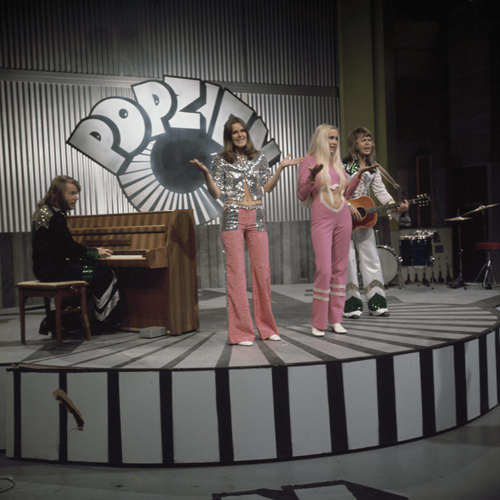
ABBA performing "Ring Ring" on Dutch television program Popzien

Though "Ring Ring" did not get the opportunity to represent Sweden in the 1973 Eurovision Song Contest, the subtitled Swedish version ("Bara Du Slog En Signal") performed very well on the Swedish charts, giving ABBA their first No. 1 hit. The English version fared almost as well, peaking at No. 2 in Sweden, Norway and Austria, and reaching the Top 10 in the charts of the Netherlands, South Africa and Rhodesia (now Zimbabwe). On the official South African year-end chart for 1974, "Ring Ring" placed 13th and its successor "Waterloo" finished 14th. It topped the charts in Belgium, becoming the first of 16 No. 1 hits for ABBA there. "Ring Ring" was the group's first release in the UK in October 1973, but failed to chart, selling only 5,000 copies. In 1973 the single won a gold record in Sweden for selling 100,000 copies. In Scandinavia the single has sold 200,000 copies. The first Australian pressing of "Ring Ring" peaked at number 92.

== Remixes ==
"Waterloo" was met with triumph, after winning Melodifestivalen, Eurovision 1974 and was an international success. In the UK, "Waterloo" was the first single released by Epic to hit the top spot. Asher insisted that "Ring Ring" be re-released as the follow-up single. On 8 May 1974, "Ring Ring" was re-recorded with a heavier backing track. The remix of the original recording, with saxophone by Ulf Andersson, was later described by Carl Magnus Palm as having a "superfluous saxophone overdub and leaden sound". "Ring Ring" was re-released on 21 June 1974 and despite a promising start on the UK charts, public interest in ABBA had dropped. ABBA had promoted the single in London for three days, making radio appearances. A planned appearance on Top of the Pops was cancelled due to a strike. This version reached No. 32 in the UK in July 1974, with "Rock'n Roll Band" issued on the B-side. "Ring Ring" was also re-released in Australia peaking at number 90. During ABBA-Mania, the remix was re-promoted and hit No. 7 in Australia.

A second remixed version, based upon the one that had been released in the UK, was included as a bonus track on the original North American release of the Waterloo album.

The master tapes of the 1974 remix were presumed missing, or at least unobtainable, for some years. For this reason, the remix did not appear on the 1994 four-CD box-set Thank You for the Music. In 1999, a CD box set of singles was released that included the remix, but it had been mastered from a vinyl single rather than the unavailable master tape. In 2001, The Definitive Collection was released, which finally included the 1974 single remix sourced from the master tape. It was later revealed on Carl Magnus Palm's website that Polar Music had acquired the master tapes from Epic Records in the UK. This had presumably occurred between 1999 and 2001.

== Versions in German and Spanish ==
A German-language version of the song was also recorded but failed to chart in West Germany. A Spanish version was also recorded (with lyrics by Doris Band), but was not released until the 1993 CD compilation Más ABBA Oro in selected countries, and internationally on the 1999 edition of ABBA Oro: Grandes Éxitos.

== Video ==
The video for the song Ring Ring was recorded in June 1974 at SVT Studios in Stockholm, Sweden. Directed by Lasse Hallstrom, it shows the members of the group singing the song in a white-painted studio and accompanied by Lasse Wellander, Ola Brunkert and another guitarist. The video did not use the original version of the song, but the remix version from 1974, although this was changed when the video was remastered in 4K to celebrate the 50th anniversary of the Ring Ring album in 2023. This video clip was included on the DVDs Number Ones and The Definitive Collection.

== Track listings ==
- Sweden

A. "Ring Ring (Bara Du Slog En Signal)"
B. "Åh vilka tider"

- Sweden, Denmark, Columbia

A. "Ring Ring" (English version)
B. "She's My Kind of Girl"

- UK, Spain, Brazil, Italy, France, West Germany, Peru, Austria, Netherlands

A. "Ring Ring" (English version)
B. "Rock'n Roll Band"

- West Germany

A. "Ring Ring" (German version)
B. "Wer Im Wartesaal Der Liebe Steht"

== Personnel ==
ABBA

- Agnetha Fältskog – lead and backing vocals
- Anni-Frid Lyngstad – lead and backing vocals
- Björn Ulvaeus – harmony and backing vocals, rhythm guitar
- Benny Andersson – backing vocals, keyboards

Additional personnel and production staff

- Janne Schaffer – lead guitar
- Rutger Gunnarsson – bass
- Ola Brunkert – drums
- Ulf Andersson – saxophone (English remix)

== Charts ==
Swedish version

Chart (1973)	Peak position
Sweden (Kvällstoppen)	1
Sweden (Svensktoppen)	1

Original English version

Chart (1973–1975)	Peak position
Australia (Kent Music Report)	92
Austria (Ö3 Austria Top 40)	2
Belgium (Ultratop 50 Flanders)	2
Belgium (Ultratop 50 Wallonia)	17
Denmark (IFPI)	1
Finland (Suomen virallinen lista)	25
Netherlands (Dutch Top 40)	5
Netherlands (Single Top 100)	5
Norway (VG-lista)	2
Rhodesia (Lyons Maid)	12
South Africa (Springbok Radio)	3
Sweden (Kvällstoppen)	2
Sweden (Tio i topp)	1
US Singles Chart (Record World)	112

Remixed English version

Chart (1974–1975)	Peak position
Australia (Kent Music Report)	90
UK Singles (Official Charts)	32

Chart (1976)	Peak position
Australia (Kent Music Report)	7
New Zealand (Recorded Music NZ)	17

=== 2023 reissue ===
Chart (2023–2025)	Peak position
UK (Sales)	21
UK (Physical)	1
UK (Vinyl)	1

=== Year-end charts ===
Year-end chart performance for "Ring Ring"
Chart (1976)	Position
Australia (Kent Music Report)	49

== Release history ==
Region	Date	Title	Label	Format	Catalog	Reference
Sweden, Norway	14 Feb 1973	"Ring Ring (Bara Du Slog En Signal)" / "Åh Vilka Tider"	Polar	7-inch vinyl	POS 1171	
Sweden, Denmark, Norway	19 Feb 1973	"Ring Ring" / "She’s My Kind Of Girl"	Polar	7-inch vinyl	POS 1172	
Spain	Apr 1973	"Ring Ring" / "Rock 'N' Roll Band"	Carnaby	7-inch vinyl	MO 1344	
Austria, Netherlands, West Germany	May 1973	"Ring Ring" / "Rock 'N' Roll Band" (Note: The B-Side of the Netherlands pressing plays "She’s My Kind of Girl".)	Polydor	7-inch vinyl	2041 422	
France	15 May 1973	"Ring Ring" / "Rock 'N' Roll Band"	Vogue	7-inch vinyl	45. X. 4252	
El Salvador, Mexico	Jul 1973	"Ring Ring" / "Rock 'N' Roll Band"	RCA Victor	7-inch vinyl	SP - 3858	
Austria, West Germany	10 Aug 1973	"Ring Ring (German version)" / "Wer Im Wartesaal Der Liebe Steht"	Polydor	7-inch vinyl	2040 105	
Australia	17 Sep 1973	"Ring Ring" / "Rock 'N' Roll Band"	RCA Victor	7-inch vinyl	102357	
South Africa, Rhodesia	Sep 1973	"Ring Ring" / "I Am Just A Girl"	Sunshine	7-inch vinyl	SUN 3	
UK	12 Oct 1973	"Ring Ring" / "Rock 'N' Roll Band"	Epic	7-inch vinyl	S EPC 1793	
Italy	22 Oct 1973	"Ring Ring" / "Rock 'N' Roll Band"	Durium	7-inch vinyl	DE. 2807	
Colombia	Oct 1973	"Ring Ring" / "Rock 'N' Roll Band"	RCA Victor	7-inch vinyl	51-51570	
Brazil	Nov 1973	"Ring Ring" / "Rock 'N' Roll Band"	RCA Victor	7-inch vinyl	101.7035	
Argentina, Panama, Uruguay	1973	"Ring Ring" / "Rock 'N' Roll Band"	RCA Victor	7-inch vinyl	31A-2293	
Chile	1973	"Ring Ring" / "Rock 'N' Roll Band"	RCA Victor	7-inch vinyl	APF-0006	
Ecuador	1973	"Ring Ring" / "Rock 'N' Roll Band"	RCA Victor	7-inch vinyl	ECK-200274	
Peru	1973	"Ring Ring" / "Rock 'N' Roll Band"	RCA Victor	7-inch vinyl	85-1481	
Austria, Germany, Switzerland	May 1974	"Ring Ring" (Note: 1974 Remix) / "Honey Honey" (Note: B-side flipped over for charts.)	Polydor	7-inch vinyl	2040120	
UK	21 Jun 1974	"Ring Ring" (Note: 1974 Remix) / "Rock 'N' Roll Band"	Epic	7-inch vinyl	S EPC 2452	
Australia	Jul 1974	"Ring Ring" / "Rock 'N' Roll Band"	RCA Victor	7-inch vinyl	102496	
Canada, USA	Dec 1974	"Ring Ring" (Note: Original version of "Ring Ring".) / "Hasta Mañana"	Atlantic	7-inch vinyl	45-3240	
Turkey	1974	"Ring Ring" (Note: 1974 Remix) / "Honey Honey"	Balet	7-inch vinyl	BE-160 (2040120)	
New Zealand	1974	"Ring Ring" (Note: 1974 Remix) / "Honey Honey" (Note: Double A-side)	Family Label	7-inch vinyl	FAY 1093	
New Zealand	1975 (Note: RCA Limited did not exist in New Zealand until 1975.)	"Ring Ring" (Note: 1974 Remix) / "Rock 'N' Roll Band"	RCA Victor	7-inch vinyl	102496	
Worldwide	19 May 2023	"Ring Ring (Bara Du Slog En Signal)" / "Åh Vilka Tider"	Polar	7-inch vinyl, picture disc	00602448459008	
Worldwide	19 May 2023	"Ring Ring" / "She’s My Kind Of Girl"	Polar	7-inch vinyl, picture disc	00602448459428	

== Official versions ==
- "Ring Ring (Bara du slog en signal)" (Swedish Version)
- "Ring Ring" (English Version)
- "Ring Ring" (English Version) – (1974 Remix, UK Single Version)
- "Ring Ring" (English Version) – (U.S. Remix 1974)
- "Ring Ring" (German Version)
- "Ring Ring" (Spanish Version)
- "Ring Ring" (Medley of Swedish, Spanish and German Versions)

== Covers ==
In 1973 Brazilian singer Sueli covered "Ring Ring" in Portuguese, titled "Férias Na Praia" (Beach Holidays). The song reached No. 9 in the Brazilian singles chart in June 1974.

Irish band The Others covered "Ring Ring" and released their version as a single in May 1974. It reached No.12 in the Irish charts.

In 1992, Swedish alternative rock band Sator recorded a version for the Swedish tribute album ABBA: The Tribute. The song peaked at number four in the Swedish Tracks chart.
