= Love Isn't Easy (But It Sure Is Hard Enough) =

1973 single by ABBA

- Danish picture sleeve

Single by ABBA

from the album Ring Ring
- B-side: "I Am Just a Girl"
- Released: June 1973
- Recorded: 14 March 1973
- Studio: Metronome, Stockholm, Sweden
- Genre: Country rock
- Length: 2:57
- Label: Polar
- Songwriters: Benny Andersson; Björn Ulvaeus
- Producers: Benny Andersson; Björn Ulvaeus

ABBA singles chronology
"Another Town, Another Train" (1973)	"Love Isn't Easy (But It Sure Is Hard Enough)" (1973)	"Rock'n Roll Band" (1973)

Audio video
- "Love Isn't Easy (But It Sure Is Hard Enough)" on YouTube

"Love Isn't Easy (But It Sure Is Hard Enough)" is a country rock song recorded by Swedish pop group ABBA. It was the fifth single to be released from their album Ring Ring, but unusually, it was not issued in ABBA's home-country of Sweden, but elsewhere in Scandinavia. It was coupled with "I Am Just a Girl" as its B-side upon release in 1973. The song was one of the last songs to be recorded for the album Ring Ring.

The song describes the common phenomenon of a quarrel between lovers, and although the song's title seems to be self-contradictory, it's unlikely that it pertains to a sexual double entendre as some have believed it to be.

== History ==
The song was written and composed by Benny Andersson & Björn Ulvaeus. All four members of the ABBA share the lead vocals.

== Chart performance ==
The single's limited release did not generate a Top 10 chart placement anywhere, though it was a minor hit in some countries where it was released. In Sweden, it reached #3 on the Tio i Topp singles chart, even though it wasn't issued as a single in that country.

Chart (1973)	Peak position
Denmark (Top 30)	21
Sweden (Tio i topp)	3

Chart (2023)	Peak position
UK Singles Sales (OCC)	48
UK Physical Singles (OCC)	5
UK Vinyl Singles (OCC)	4

== Release history ==
Region	Date	Title	Label	Format	Catalog
Denmark	June 1973	"Love Isn't Easy (But It Sure Is Hard Enough)" / "I Am Just A Girl"	Polar	7-inch vinyl	POS 1175
Europe	19 May 2023	"Love Isn't Easy (But It Sure Is Hard Enough)" / "I Am Just A Girl"	Polar	7-inch vinyl, picture disc	00602448459459
