= Me and Bobby and Bobby's Brother =

Song by ABBA

from the album Ring Ring
- Released: 1973
- Recorded: 1970
- Genre: Pop
- Length: 2:50
- Label: Polar
- Songwriters: Benny Andersson & Björn Ulvaeus
- Producers: Benny Andersson & Björn Ulvaeus

Audio video
- "Me and Bobby and Bobby's Brother" on YouTube

"Me and Bobby and Bobby's Brother" is a song by ABBA, released on their 1973 album Ring Ring.

== Synopsis ==
The song is about "a woman's reminiscence of her childhood friends".

== Critical reception ==
Abba - Uncensored on the Record said, "the strangely-titled 'Me and Bobby and Bobby's Brother' bears the mark of a relatively inexperienced lyricist", adding that, "Björn swiftly improved on this". It also said the song was, "another fairly typical early ditty that was not unlike" Me and Bobby McGee' in melody at times", and that it, "was certainly nothing more than album filler". The author was clearly unaware that it was one of the very few instances in which Benny was the author of the lyrics.
