= Rock'n Roll Band =

1973 single by ABBA

"Rock'n Roll Band" is a song originally released by Björn & Benny as the B-Side to their final single released in Japan, "Love Has Its Ways". The following year, the song was re-recorded by Swedish pop group ABBA (then credited as "Björn & Benny with Anna & Frida") for their debut album Ring Ring.

== Background ==
"Rock'n Roll Band"

Song by Björn & Benny
- A-side: "Love Has Its Ways"
- Released: November 1972
- Genre: Pop
- Length: 3:07
- Label: Epic

Björn & Benny chronology
"He Is Your Brother" (1972)	"Rock'n Roll Band" (1972)	"Ring Ring (Bara Du Slog En Signal)" (1973)

The previous Björn & Benny single released in Japan "En Carousel" did not repeat the success of "She’s My Kind Of Girl" in Japan. The representatives of the Japanese record company thought that they should contribute a Japanese melody for the duo to record, more akin to "She’s My Kind Of Girl". By autumn 1972, the duo recorded "Love Has Its Ways" and "Rock’n Roll Band". The single did not become a major hit. Around the time of the release, Björn & Benny gave more of a focus towards recording an English-language album LP together as "Björn & Benny, Agnetha & Frida". A slightly longer version of "Rock'n Roll Band" with vocals by Agnetha Fältskog and Frida Lyngstad was recorded and included on "Ring Ring".

The Benny & Björn version was later released on the remastered version of Lycka in 2005. Polar had not kept copies of the master tapes for "Love Has Its Ways" and the original version of "Rock'n Roll Band" by Bjorn & Benny. By the mid-1980s, Sony Music Japan (formerly CBS) junked the tapes of the Björn & Benny singles released in Japan when the licence for the recordings expired. The recordings had to be mastered from vinyl.

== ABBA version ==
"Rock'n Roll Band"

Single by ABBA

from the album Ring Ring
- B-side: "Another Town, Another Train"
- Released: July 1973
- Recorded: 1972–1973
- Genre: Pop rock
- Length: 3:11
- Label: Playboy Records
- Songwriters: Benny Andersson; Björn Ulvaeus
- Producers: Benny Andersson; Björn Ulvaeus

ABBA singles chronology
"Love Isn't Easy (But It Sure Is Hard Enough)" (1973)	"Rock'n Roll Band" (1973)	"I Am Just a Girl" (1973)

Audio video
- "Rock'n Roll Band" on YouTube

The ABBA version was the closing track of the debut album Ring Ring originally released in March 1973, but released as a B-side to the English version of Ring Ring in several countries including Germany, France and The Netherlands in May 1973. The song was released in the US in July 1973 as their third single on Playboy Records, credited to "Björn & Benny with Anna & Frieda" (with an 'E' added to Frida). The flip side was the previous single, "Another Town, Another Train". The Ring Ring album was not released in the United States until 1995.

In the UK, it was released as the B-side to "Ring Ring" when issued in October 1973 and when re-issued in June 1974. As in the US, the Ring Ring album was not released, so these two tracks were the only ones from the album to be released in the UK until more were included in Greatest Hits in 1976. "Rock'n Roll Band" unavailable on an album in the UK until Ring Ring was eventually released in 1992.

South Africa and Rhodesia released it as the B-side to "Another Town, Another Train" on the Sunshine label in February 1974.

The song was the first ABBA song to include ABBA drummer Roger Palm. Guitarist Janne Schaffer had played the guitars for this song and when asked what the most guitar-heavy tracks he recorded with ABBA, three songs came to his mind: "Rock’n Roll Band", "Watch Out" and "King Kong Song", after being inspired by listening to Deep Purple. The Big Takeover describes the song as a “lightweight escapist fun but carried musical bite akin to other lushly arranged pop-rock combos like Electric Light Orchestra”.

== Release history ==
Region	Date	Title	Label	Format	Catalog	Reference
Japan	Nov 1972	"Love Has Its Ways" / "Rock'n Roll Band"	Epic	7-inch vinyl	ECPA-49	
USA	Jul 1973	"Rock'n Roll Band" / " Another Town, Another Train "	Playboy Records	7-inch vinyl	P 50025	
USA	Jul 1973	"Rock'n Roll Band" / "Rock'n Roll Band"	Playboy Records	7-inch vinyl, promo	P 50025	
