= He Is Your Brother =

1972 ABBA song

- Cover of an early Swedish release

Single by Björn & Benny, Agnetha & Anni-Frid

from the album Ring Ring
- B-side: "Santa Rosa"
- Released: 1 November 1972
- Recorded: 17 October 1972 at Europa Film Studios
- Genre: Pop rock; folk rock
- Length: 3:18
- Label: Polar
- Songwriters: Benny Andersson; Björn Ulvaeus
- Producers: Benny Andersson; Björn Ulvaeus

Björn & Benny, Agnetha & Anni-Frid singles chronology
"People Need Love" (1972)	"He Is Your Brother" (1972)	"Ring Ring (Bara Du Slog En Signal)" (1973)

Björn & Benny singles chronology
"People Need Love" (1972)	"He Is Your Brother" (1972)	"Love Has Its Ways / Rock'n Roll Band" (1972)

Audio video
- "He Is Your Brother" on YouTube

"He Is Your Brother" is a song recorded by the Swedish recording group ABBA, then known as Björn & Benny, Agnetha & Anni-Frid, which was written and produced by Andersson and Ulvaeus. It was included on their debut studio album Ring Ring (1973), and was chosen as the album's second single on 1 November 1972 via Polar Music, released only in Scandinavia and New Zealand. The song features lyrical themes similar to those of their previous single "People Need Love", reaching out to your fellow man.

The song only charted in Scandinavian countries. In Sweden, it did not reach the sales chart but was a big radio hit reaching #1 on the Tio i Topp singles chart.

== Background ==
"He Is Your Brother" was written and composed by Benny Andersson & Björn Ulvaeus. The recording sessions for the group’s debut album commenced on 26 September 1972, with this song being recorded in October 1972. All four band members share lead-vocals on this recording. A downwards glissando is used in the introduction of the song, similarly used in "Dancing Queen".

The song was one of the early favourites among the group's members, and was the only song from the group's first album which was performed during the group's 1973 Folkpark tour, 1977 tour of Europe and Australia. The song was therefore featured live in the film ABBA: The Movie (1977).

In January 1979, "He Is Your Brother" was part of the opening medley, performed by artists (along with ABBA), during the Music for UNICEF Concert.

=== B-side: "Santa Rosa" ===
The B-side of the single, "Santa Rosa" had the working title "Grandpa's Banjo" and was originally recorded in 1972 with the intention of releasing it as single in Japan. It was considered a "Bjorn And Benny" track. The writers have explained their dislike of the song, saying that the lyrics were clumsy due to the fact they only put the name "Santa Rosa" in because it fit the song; they actually came from Stockholm.

In 1972, the Björn and Benny single, "She’s My Kind of Girl" was released in Japan in 1972. This single proved to be a success and several singles had been released including "En Carousel". With the inclusion of all ABBA members, the band entered and performed "Santa Rosa" in the 1972 Yamaha World Popular Song Contest. This took place in Japan on 17 November 1972, without any success.

== Track listings and formats ==
Scandinavian and New Zealand single

1. "He Is Your Brother" – 3:18
2. "Santa Rosa" – 3:00

US single (shelved)

1. "He Is Your Brother" – 3:18
2. "I Saw It in the Mirror" – 2:34

== Personnel ==
- Agnetha Fältskog – lead and backing vocals
- Anni-Frid Lyngstad – lead and backing vocals
- Björn Ulvaeus – electric guitar and lead
- Benny Andersson – piano and backing vocals

=== Additional musicians ===
- Jan Bandel – drums
- Stefan Brolund – bass
- Janne Schaffer – electric guitar
- Håkan Jansson – Baritone saxophone

== Charts ==
Chart performance for "He Is Your Brother"
Chart (1972–1973)	Peak position
Sweden (Tio i topp)	1

Chart (2023–2024)	Peak position
UK (Sales)	46
UK (Physical)	3
UK (Vinyl)	2

== Release history ==
Region	Date	Title	Label	Format	Catalog
Sweden, Norway	1 Nov 1972	"He Is Your Brother" / "Santa Rosa"	Polar	7-inch vinyl	POS 1168
New Zealand	1972	"He Is Your Brother" / "Santa Rosa"	Family	7-inch vinyl	FAY 1054
Europe	19 May 2023	"He Is Your Brother" / "Santa Rosa"	Polar	7-inch vinyl, picture disc	00602448459480
