= I Saw It in the Mirror =

Song by ABBA

from the album Ring Ring
- Released: 1973
- Recorded: 1970
- Genre: Pop
- Length: 2:34
- Label: Polar
- Songwriter(s): Benny Andersson & Björn Ulvaeus
- Producer(s): Benny Andersson & Björn Ulvaeus

Audio video
- "I Saw It In The Mirror" on YouTube

"I Saw It in the Mirror" is a song by Swedish pop band ABBA, released on their 1973 album Ring Ring.

== Production and release ==
The song was recorded in early 1970.

The deluxe reissue of the Ring Ring album includes a rare original version of I Saw It in the Mirror - by Billy G-son.

== Composition ==
Björn and Benny are the lead vocalists on this song. The song includes an electric piano and a synth bass. The song has a chord-per-bar pattern that is sometimes broken due to filigree.

== Critical reception ==
Bright Lights Dark Shadows: The Real Story of Abba describes it as "dirge-like", and says it "holds the dubious distinction of being the least-liked Abba track ever among the group's hardcore fans", adding that it is a leftover from an earlier project. ABBA: Let The Music Speak notes that this song was an "uninspired attempt at laid-back R&B", adding though that the song gave Agnetha and Frida some isolated moments by way of their "'echo' vocals". It also refers to the song as "less remarkable", "filler track", and "lacking trademark ABBA vocal ambience".
