= People Need Love =

- Standard European artwork (Swedish picture sleeve)

Single by Björn & Benny, Agnetha & Anni-Frid

from the album Ring Ring
- B-side: "Merry-Go-Round (En karusell)"
- Released: 30 April 1972 (television) 1 June 1972 (single)
- Recorded: 29 March 1972
- Studio: Metronome, Stockholm, Sweden
- Genre: Psychedelic rock; Europop
- Length: 2:45
- Label: Polar
- Songwriters: Benny Andersson; Björn Ulvaeus
- Producers: Benny Andersson; Björn Ulvaeus

Björn & Benny, Agnetha & Anni-Frid singles chronology
"People Need Love" (1972)	"He Is Your Brother" (1972)

Björn & Benny singles chronology
"En Karusell" (1972)	"People Need Love" (1972)	"He Is Your Brother" (1972)

Anni-Frid Lyngstad singles chronology
"Vi är alla bara barn i början" / "Kom och sjung en sång" (1972)	"People Need Love" (1972)	"Man vill ju leva lite dessemellan" (1972)

Agnetha Fältskog singles chronology
"Sången föder dig tillbaka" (1972)	"People Need Love" (1972)	"He Is Your Brother" (1972)

Audio video
- "People Need Love" on YouTube

"People Need Love" is the debut single recorded in March 1972 by Swedish pop group ABBA, at the time known as Björn & Benny, Agnetha & Anni-Frid. The song was on the group's first album, Ring Ring, released in 1973.

"People Need Love" first charted in Sweden at number 20 in late July 1972, then in August it peaked at number 17 for two weeks on the Kvällstoppen chart, staying on the chart for four weeks in total.

== Composition ==
As with the majority of ABBA songs, "People Need Love" was written and composed by the two male band members, Benny Andersson and Björn Ulvaeus. It was engineered by Michael Tretow who aimed to create a Phil Spector-like wall of sound on the recording. The song begins in the key of B major and modulates up to C♯ major for the final chorus.

Although their debut album did not bring them to global attention, it follows some standards of ABBA's style. The ballad is about what people can give each other to make their lives easier and create a better world.

== Reception ==
The basic aim of the "People Need Love" single was not to promote the quartet, since all four individuals had other commitments and did not have the time to form a permanent group (an example of this is the crediting; the single in most of the territories is credited to "Björn & Benny, Agnetha & Anni-Frid"), but to promote the "Björn & Benny" duo, which was the singing and songwriting partnership of the two men. The women were simply guesting on the new "Björn & Benny" single.

Andersson discussed about the song “After a period of slipping and sliding through the Swedish cabaret scene for far too long, we were all extremely inspired by entering the Metronome studio (with Michael B. Tretow!) to record what we thought to be a real pop tune. It came out better than we had expected and gave us confidence for the future.” "People Need Love" made the top 20 of the combined Swedish singles and album charts.

The Playboy Records U.S. release was credited to "Bjorn & Benny (with Svenska Flicka)". The single was reviewed by Cash Box in September 1972: “This single has all the ingredients necessary for becoming a top 10 chart record. Containing the same "How Do You Do" feeling, this sing-along tune will win fans immediately. Should spread like wild fire”. Record World magazine noted that the “new duo from Sweden offer a breezy sing-a-long tune that perfect for the Top 40”. The song had a "pleasant sound" and stated that this could be the "label's first major hit". American disc jockey Kal Rudman gave a review in Record World magazine in October 1972. “This looks like the hottest record for Playboy since the company was formed”. "People Need Love" “is on a lot of secondary stations and there should be a lot of big things happening in the next few weeks.” It was the foursome's first charting record in the United States, where it peaked at No. 114 on the Cashbox singles chart and No. 117 on the Record World singles chart. According to ABBA's manager Stig Anderson, could have been a much bigger American hit, if not for the limited distribution resources of the label that was unable to meet the demand from retailers and radio programmers.

At the time of the single's release, the Ring Ring album had not been planned, since there was no intention to form a permanent group. However, the song was included on the album the following year. Although recorded earlier than most of the album, it can retroactively be considered the lead single from Ring Ring.

In the Netherlands and Belgium, the single had its release in August 1973 as the follow-up to the highly successful single "Ring Ring". However, it performed rather badly, reaching only No. 47 on the Radio Noordzee Top 50 from the Dutch service of Radio North Sea International.

== Track listing ==
1. A. "People Need Love" - 2:45
2. B. "Merry-Go-Round (En karusell)" - 3:24

== Personnel ==
- Agnetha Fältskog – lead and backing vocals
- Anni-Frid Lyngstad – lead and backing vocals
- Björn Ulvaeus – acoustic guitar, lead and backing vocals
- Benny Andersson – piano, keyboards, lead and backing vocals

=== Additional musicians ===
- Ola Brunkert – drums
- Mike Watson – bass
- Janne Schaffer – electric guitar

== Charts ==
Chart performance for "People Need Love"
Chart (1972–1973)	Peak position
Netherlands (Dutch Top 40 Tipparade)	21
Sweden (Kvällstoppen)	17
Sweden (Tio i Topp)	3
US Top 100 Looking Ahead (Cash Box)	114
US Singles Chart (Record World)	117

Chart (2023–2025)	Peak position
UK (Sales)	47
UK (Physical)	4
UK (Vinyl)	3

== Release history ==
Region	Date	Title	Label	Format	Catalog	Reference
Sweden, Denmark	1 Jun 1972	"People Need Love" / "Merry-Go-Round"	Polar	7-inch vinyl	POS 1156	
Austria, West Germany	Jul 1972 (Re-released Dec 1972)	"People Need Love" / "Merry-Go-Round"	Polydor	7-inch vinyl	2041 369	
Canada, Philippines, USA	Sep 1972	"People Need Love" / "Merry-Go-Round"	Playboy Records	7-inch vinyl	P 50014	
France	10 Oct 1972	"People Need Love" / "Merry-Go-Round"	Vogue	7-inch vinyl	45. V. 4148	
New Zealand	1972	"People Need Love" / "Merry-Go-Round"	Family	7-inch vinyl	FAY 1053	
South Africa	1973	"People Need Love" / "Merry-Go-Round"	Sunshine	7-inch vinyl	SUN 1	
Europe	19 May 2023	"People Need Love" / "Merry-Go-Round"	Polar	7-inch vinyl, picture disc	00602448459435	
