= Björn Ulvaeus =

Swedish musician (born 1945)

Björn Ulvaeus KVO1kl
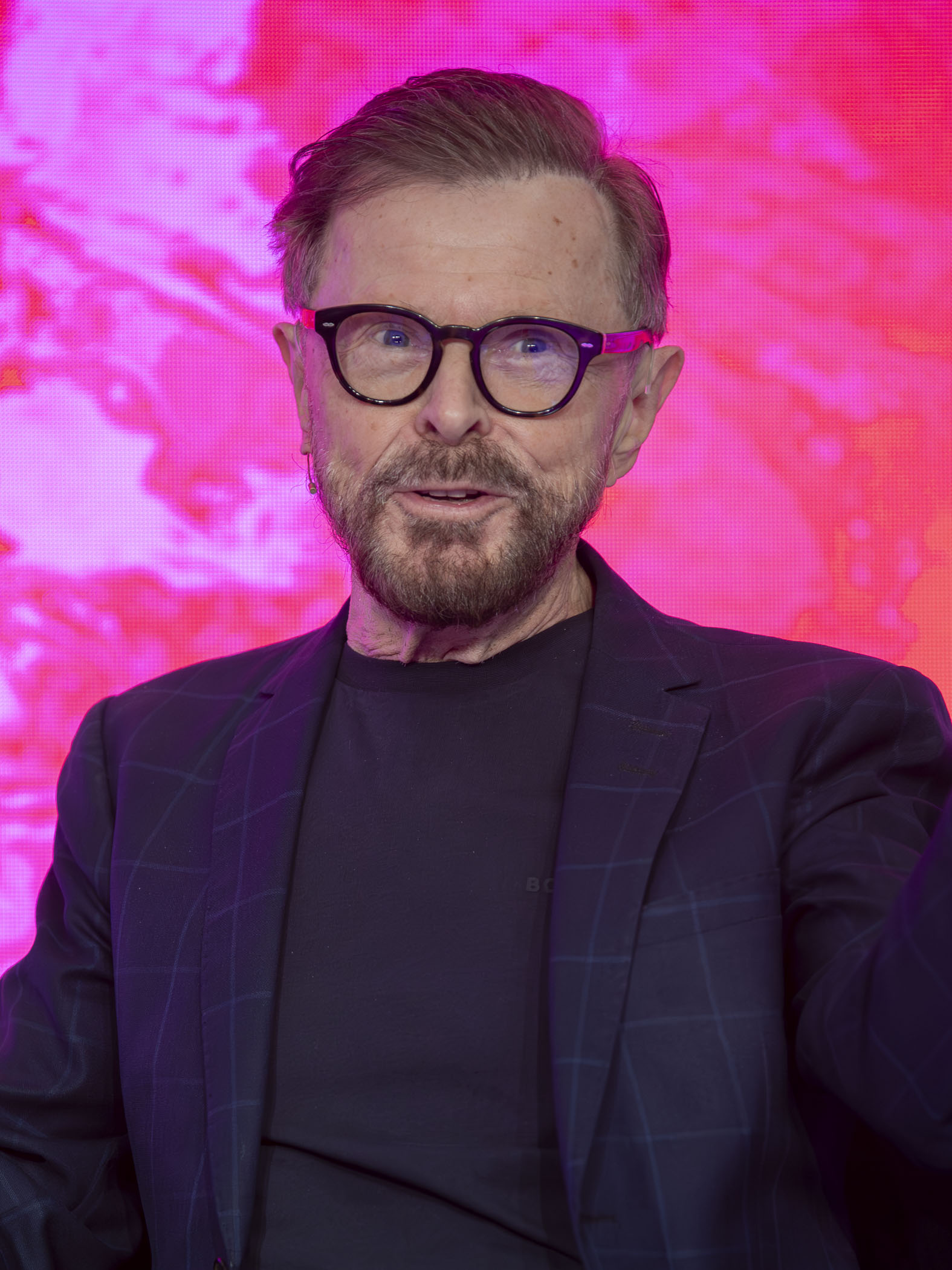
- Ulvaeus in 2025
- Born: Björn Kristian Ulvaeus; 25 April 1945 (age 81); Gothenburg, Sweden
- Occupations: Musician; singer; songwriter; producer
- Years active: 1963–present
- Spouses: Agnetha Fältskog (m. 1971; div. 1980) Lena Källersjö (m. 1981; div. 2022) Christina Sas (m. 2024)
- Children: 4, including Linda
- Musical career
- Genres: Europop; folk rock; Swedish folk; rock; Euro disco; schlager
- Instruments: Guitar; vocals
- Labels: Polar Music; RCA Victor; Atlantic; Epic; Polydor; PolyGram; Universal Music
- Formerly of: Hootenanny Singers, ABBA

Björn Kristian Ulvaeus (Swedish: [ˈbjœːɳ ɵlˈvěːɵs]; born 25 April 1945) is a Swedish musician, singer, songwriter, and producer best known as a member of the musical group ABBA. He is also the co-composer of the musicals Chess, Kristina från Duvemåla, and Mamma Mia! He co-produced the films Mamma Mia! and Mamma Mia! Here We Go Again with fellow ABBA member and close friend Benny Andersson. He is the oldest member of the group.

== Early life ==
Björn Kristian Ulvaeus was born in Gothenburg on 25 April 1945. At age 6, he moved with his family to Västervik, Kalmar County. His parents were Aina Eliza Viktoria (née Bengtsson; 1909–2005) and Erik Gunnar Ulvaeus (1912–1999). Ulvaeus has one sister, Eva Margareta (born 1948). He was influenced by Muddy Waters, Howlin' Wolf, John Lee Hooker, Jimmy Reed and Little Walter. Ulvaeus did military service.

== Career ==
=== Pre-ABBA ===
Before gaining international recognition with ABBA, Ulvaeus was a member of the Swedish folk-schlager band Hootenanny Singers, known earlier as the "West Bay Singers", who had an enormous following in Scandinavia. While on the road in southern Sweden in 1966, they encountered the Hep Stars, and Ulvaeus quickly became friends with the group's keyboard player, Benny Andersson. The two musicians shared a passion for songwriting, and each found a composing partner in the other. On meeting again that summer, they composed their first song together: "Isn't It Easy To Say", a song soon to be recorded by Andersson's group. The two continued teaming up for music, helping out each other's bands in the recording studio, and adding guitar or keyboards respectively to the recordings. In 1968, they composed two songs together: "A Flower in My Garden", recorded by Hep Stars, and their first real hit "Ljuva Sextital", performed by popular Swedish artist Brita Borg, for which Stig Anderson wrote lyrics. The latter, a cabarét-style song about the 1960s, was submitted for the 1969 Swedish heats for the Eurovision Song Contest, but was rejected. Another hit came in 1969 with "Speleman", also recorded by Hep Stars.

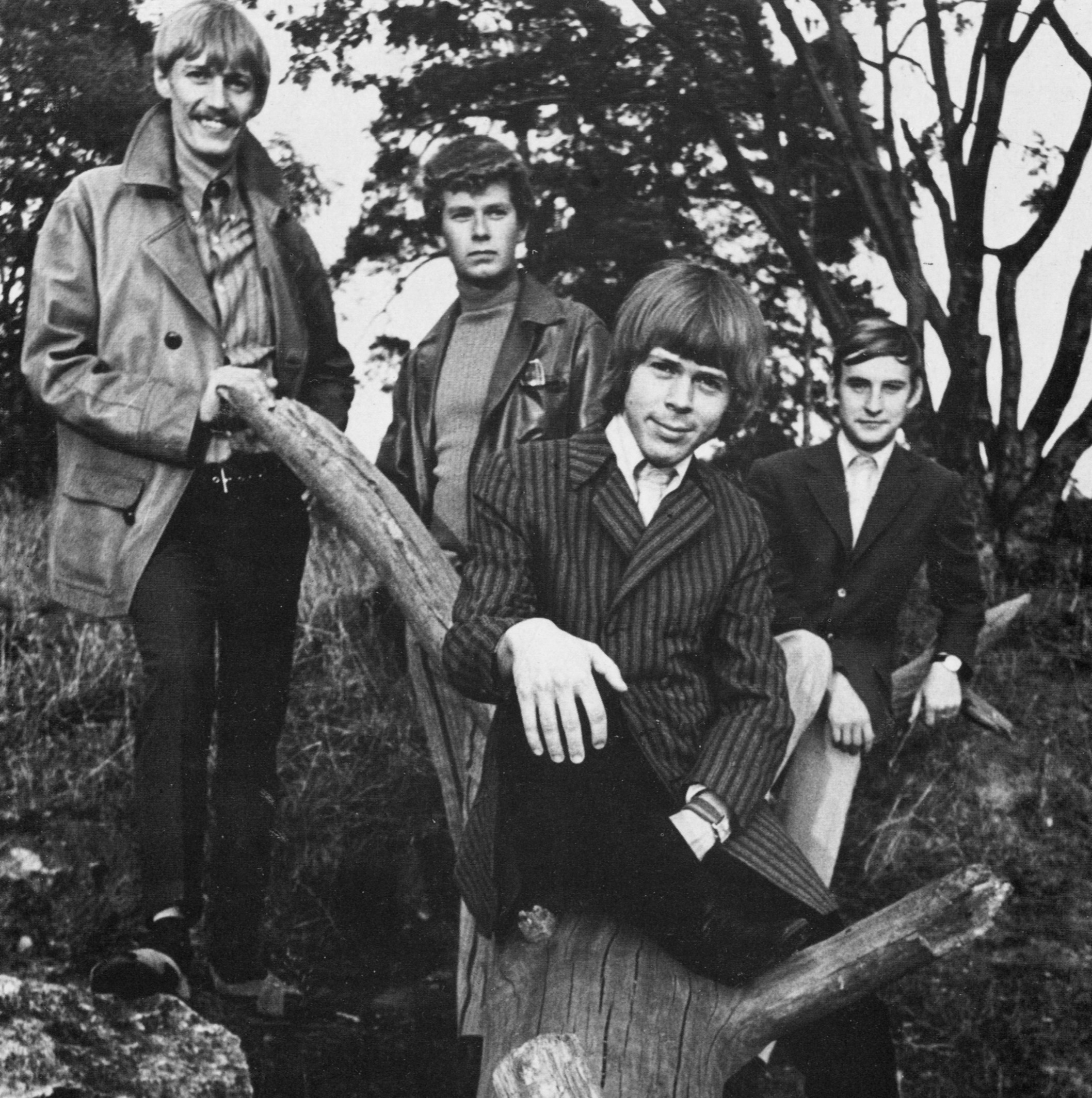
Björn Ulvaeus (second from right) with Hootenanny Singers, 1967

While filming a nostalgic schlager special for television in May 1969, Björn met nineteen-year-old future wife and singer-songwriter Agnetha Fältskog.

Björn Ulvaeus continued recording and touring with Hootenanny Singers to great acclaim while working as in-house producer at Polar Record Company (headed by future manager Stig Anderson), with Benny as his new partner. The twosome produced records by other artists and continued writing songs together. Polar artist Arne Lamberts Swedish version of "A Flower in My Garden" ("Fröken Blåklint") was one of Björn & Benny's first in-house productions. In December 1969, they recorded the new song "She's My Kind of Girl", which became their first single as a duo. It was released in March 1970, giving them a minor hit in Sweden and a top-ten hit in Japan two years later.

The Hootenanny Singers entered Svensktoppen, the Swedish radio charts, in 1970 with "Omkring Tiggarn Från Luossa", a cover of an old folk-schlager song. It remained on the charts for 52 consecutive weeks, a record which endured until 1990; the song was produced by Björn and Benny, and had Ulvaeus's solo vocal and Benny's piano.

=== ABBA years ===
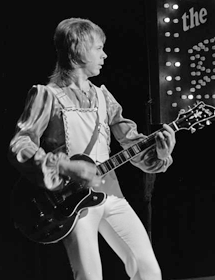
Ulvaeus on The Eddy Go Round Show in 1975

Björn Ulvaeus's girlfriend Agnetha Fältskog eventually joined Björn&Benny, which was afterwards called Björn, Benny & Agnetha, Frida eventually shortening it to ABBA. Björn was the guitar player in the band, but he also sang lead vocals in the following songs: "People Need Love", "Merry Go Round", "Santa Rosa", "Another Town Another Train", "I Saw It in the Mirror", "Love Isn't Easy (But It Sure Is Hard Enough)", "He Is Your Brother", "Rock'n Roll Band", "She's My Kind of Girl", "Honey Honey", "Sitting in the Palmtree", "King King Song", "Watch Out, Man in the Middle, Rock Me, Crazy World", "Why Did It Have To Be Me?", "Summer Night City", "Does Your Mother Know", "Two for the Price Of One".

On 6 July 1971, Björn and Agnetha married. In July 1980, Björn and Agnetha Fältskog divorced, and the band broke up shortly after the divorce.

=== Post-ABBA ===
After ABBA went on hiatus in 1982, Ulvaeus and Andersson created the musicals Chess, a collaboration with lyricist Tim Rice, Kristina från Duvemåla (based on The Emigrants novels by Swedish writer Vilhelm Moberg), and Mamma Mia! (based on ABBA songs).

Together with Andersson, Ulvaeus was nominated for the Drama Desk Award in the category "Outstanding Music" (for the musical Chess), and for a Tony Award in a category "Best Orchestrations" (for the musical Mamma Mia!). The original cast recordings for both musicals were nominated for a Grammy Award.

For the 2004 semi-final of the Eurovision Song Contest in Istanbul, thirty years after ABBA had won the 1974 contest in Brighton, UK, Ulvaeus appeared briefly in a special comedy video made for the interval act, entitled "Our Last Video". Each of the four members of the group appeared briefly in cameo roles, as did others such as Cher and Rik Mayall. The video was not included in the official DVD release of the Eurovision Contest, but was issued as a separate DVD release. It was billed as the first time the four had worked together since the group split. In fact, they each filmed their appearances separately.

Ulvaeus also shared with Andersson "The Special International Ivor Novello Award" from the British Academy of Songwriters, Composers and Authors, "The Music Export Prize" from the Swedish Ministry of Industry and Trade (2008), and "Lifetime Achievement Award" from the Swedish Music Publishers Association (SMFF).

On 15 April 2013, it was officially announced by the EBU and the SVT that Ulvaeus and Andersson, with the late Swedish DJ and record producer Avicii, had composed the anthem for the Eurovision Song Contest 2013. The song was performed for the first time in the Final on 18 May.

In 2016 American media reported that British entrepreneur Simon Fuller had approached Ulvaeus and other members of ABBA with his idea to create a virtual reality ABBA using new technology. In November that year Fuller was photographed in London meeting with Ulvaeus. In September 2017, Benny Andersson told Swedish newspaper Expressen that there were plans for ABBA to tour "virtually", using digital avatars of the group and Ulvaeus told the BBC that the idea had been proposed to the band by Simon Fuller. In April 2018, the four members issued a statement saying that during preparations for the tour, they had regrouped with Fuller in the studio and recorded two new songs, titled "I Still Have Faith in You" and "Don't Shut Me Down".

In 2019, Ulvaeus worked with Swedish songwriter Andreas Carlsson to arrange an English dub of Tomas Ledin's jukebox musical film En del av mitt hjärta (English: A Piece of My Heart) directed by Edward af Sillén. Ulvaeus was asked to write English lyrics for Ledin's songs as they are long-term friends.

In 2020, Björn Ulvaeus has been appointed President of CISAC, the International Confederation of Societies of Authors and Composers.

On 2 September 2021, via YouTube livestream, ABBA announced their virtual concert residency "ABBA Voyage", as well as the release of a studio album, recorded between 2017 and 2021. The new record, their first in 40 years, features ten tracks, including "I Still Have Faith In You" and "Don't Shut Me Down", which were first shown in the aforementioned livestream event and released as a double A-side single. On 5 November 2021, the Voyage album was released worldwide, and on 27 May 2022, ABBA Voyage opened in a purpose-built venue named the ABBA Arena at the Queen Elizabeth Olympic Park in London.

Since November 2021, Ulvaeus and British actor Ian McKellen have posted Instagram videos featuring the pair knitting Christmas jumpers and other festive attire. In 2023, it was revealed that Ulvaeus and McKellen would be knitting stagewear for Kylie Minogue as part of her More Than Just a Residency concert residency at Voltaire at The Venetian Las Vegas.

In October 2023, it was confirmed that Ulvaeus would be the keynote speaker for The Business Day at Bridlington Spa in the United Kingdom on Friday 7 June 2024. Ulvaeus would discuss the creation of ABBA Voyage, leadership, entrepreneurship, artificial intelligence (AI), technology, innovation, metadata and the complexity of business in the music industry.

On 21 March 2024, shortly before the 50th anniversary of their win at the Eurovision Song Contest, all four members of ABBA were appointed Commander, First Class, of the Royal Order of Vasa by His Majesty King Carl XVI Gustaf of Sweden. This was the first time in almost 50 years that the Swedish Royal Orders of Knighthood was bestowed on Swedes. ABBA shared the honour with nine other people.

== Personal life ==
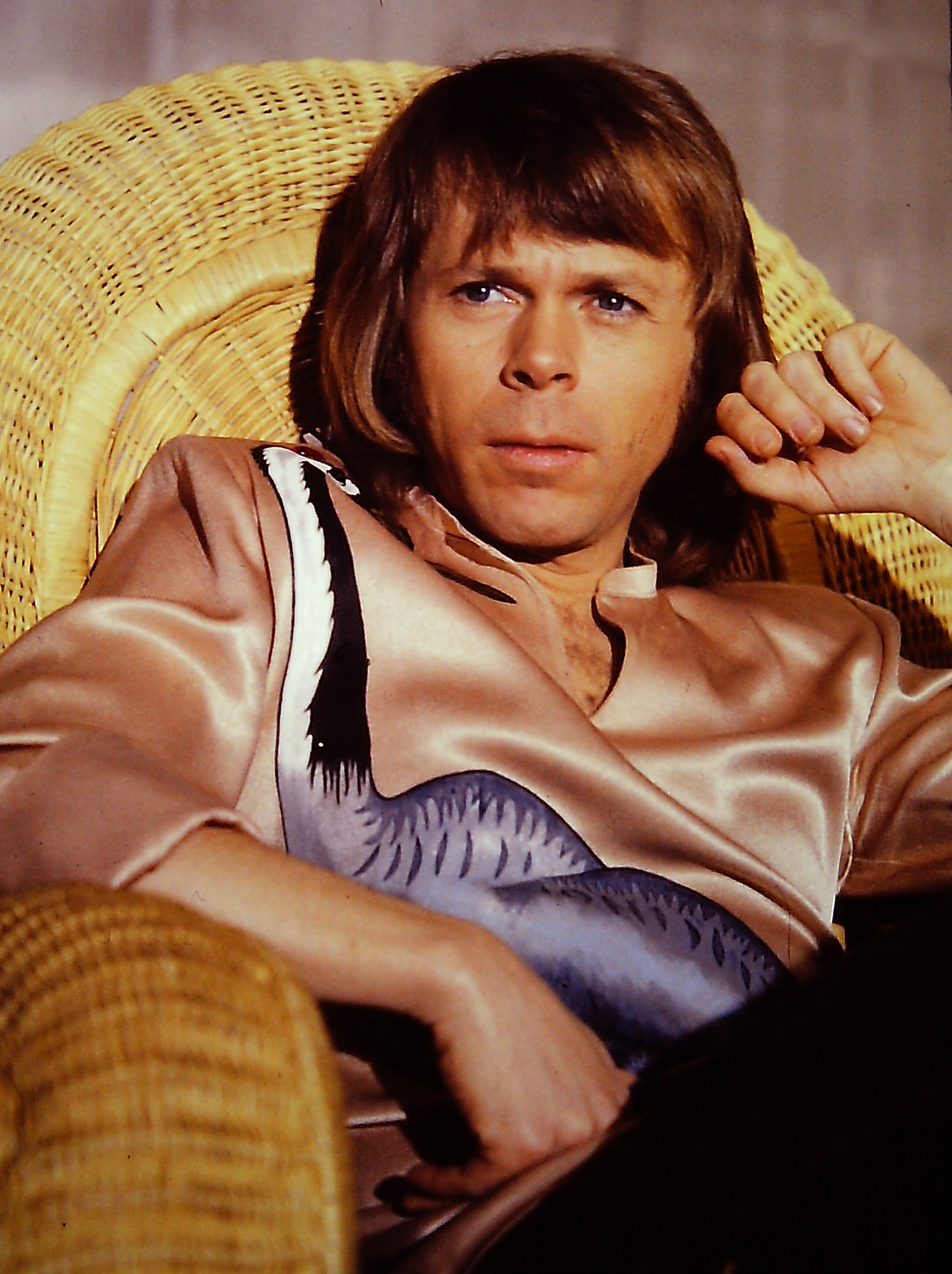
Ulvaeus in 1978

On 6 July 1971, Ulvaeus married Agnetha Fältskog. They had two children: Linda Elin Ulvaeus (born 23 February 1973), and Peter Christian Ulvaeus (born 4 December 1977). The couple separated in early 1979, and their divorce was finalised in July 1980.

Ulvaeus married music journalist Lena Källersjö (1949–2026) on 6 January 1981. They have two daughters. Ulvaeus and Källersjö lived on a private island in Djursholm, an upscale area in Danderyd Municipality north of Stockholm. From 1984 to 1990, they lived in the United Kingdom, where Ulvaeus founded an IT business with his brother. In February 2022, Ulvaeus and Källersjö announced their separation.

In 2021, while producing Voyage, Ulvaeus met Christina Sas, a product manager at Universal Music Group, and they began dating the following year. Ulvaeus and Sas were married on 21 September 2024 in Copenhagen, Denmark. The ceremony was conducted by Sandi Toksvig.

Ulvaeus is one of the four owners (along with Per Gessle) of NoteHeads, a Swedish company which publishes the music notation program Igor Engraver.

Ulvaeus is a member of the International Humanist and Ethical Union's Swedish member organisation Humanisterna, and was awarded their annual prize, Hedenius-priset, in 2006. Ulvaeus describes himself as an atheist. He has appeared on several shows discussing his views about religion.

Ulvaeus suffered from severe long-term memory loss. However, in a 2009 interview, he stated that reports of his memory loss were "hugely exaggerated". In a TV interview with Fredrik Skavlan, Ulvaeus said the memory loss pertained to episodic memory. He said that, for instance, he was not nostalgic for his days with ABBA: "It was good while it lasted."

The Guardian called him Sweden's "highest-profile cash-free campaigner", explaining that "after his son was robbed several years ago, Ulvaeus became an evangelist for the electronic payment movement, claiming that cash was the primary cause of crime and that 'all activity in the black economy requires cash'". He has reportedly been living cash-free for more than a decade, and ABBA The Museum has operated cash-free since it opened in May 2013.

=== Tax vindication ===
The Swedish Tax Agency accused Björn Ulvaeus of failing to pay 90 million kronor (US$12.8 million) in back taxes for eight years ending in 2005. The agency claimed that he "laundered" his music royalty income through institutions in several foreign countries. Ulvaeus paid the taxes as a precautionary measure during the 2½-year dispute. In October 2008, the county administrative court decided the case in Ulvaeus' favour, ruling that he never owed any of the 90 million kronor.

== Music Rights Awareness Foundation ==
In 2016, Ulvaeus co-founded the "Music Rights Awareness Foundation" with the Swedish songwriter Max Martin and the pop songwriter Niclas Molinder. This political foundation aims to increase knowledge of music rights worldwide, through education and support, and to help music creators to take control of their rights and be able to live on their music – regardless of economical, geographical and cultural conditions.

=== WIPO for Creators ===
The World Intellectual Property Organization (WIPO) and the Music Rights Awareness Foundation (MRAF) have established a consortium, WIPO for Creators, to promote awareness of intellectual property (IP) rights and support creators in securing recognition and fair remuneration for their work. The initiative, launched through an agreement signed by WIPO Director General Francis Gurry and MRAF co-founders Björn Ulvaeus, Niclas Molinder, and Max Martin, seeks to engage public and private stakeholders in global education and support programs. Emphasizing the importance of effective copyright systems, especially amid the COVID-19 crisis and the growing complexity of the digital marketplace, the consortium aims to strengthen creators’ understanding of IP rights and data management to ensure proper compensation and credit for their contributions. Bjorn Ulvaeus, shared a video explaining how knowledge of IP rights is key to a successful music career.

== Awards ==
- Sweden: Royal Order of Vasa, Commander First Class (21 March 2024)

== Discography ==
Title	Year	Peak chart positions			Sales	Album
Title	Year	SWE	SWE (Svensktoppen)	JAP	Sales	Album
"Raring"	1968	8	7	—		De bästa med Hootenanny Singers & Björn Ulvaeus
"Fröken Fredriksson"	1968	7	5	—		5 år
"Saknar du något min kära"	1969	19	4	—		De bästa med Hootenanny Singers & Björn Ulvaeus
"Partaj-aj-aj-aj"	1969	—	—	—		På tre man hand
"Kvinnan i mitt liv"	1969	—	9	—		På tre man hand
"She's My Kind of Girl" (Note: Recorded without Anni-Frid and Agnetha. Originally released in 1970 in Sweden and France. Later released in Japan in 1972 which became a hit. The song was included in the debut album by Björn & Benny, Agnetha & Frida (renamed ABBA).)	1970	—	—	6	Japan: 188,000+	Ring Ring
"Hej gamle man" (Note: Featuring all ABBA members)	1970	5	1	—		Lycka
"Livet går sin gång" (Note: This song was an album track, but charted in the Toppentipset. (Svensktoppen charts))	1970	—	14	—		Lycka
"Hey, Musikant" (Germany only)	1971	—	—	—		Lycka (2006 reissue)
"Det kan ingen doktor hjälpa"	1971	—	9	—		Lycka (2006 reissue)
"På bröllop" (Note: Featuring all ABBA members. B-Side of "Det kan ingen doktor hjälpa".)	1971	—	9	—		Lycka (2006 reissue)
"Tänk om jorden vore ung"	1971	—	1	—		Lycka (1972 reissue)
"Love has its Ways" (Japan only) (Note: The B-side is an early version of "Rock N Roll Band".)	1972	—	—	—		Lycka (2006 reissue)
"En karusell" (Note: Featuring all ABBA members. Released in Sweden and Japan. The Japanese single (titled "En Carousel" contains an alternative version of Merry-Go-Round (released as the B-side of "People Need Love"). "En Karusell" charted in the Toppentipset (Svensktoppen charts))	1972	—	12	—		Lycka (2006 reissue)
"Att finnas till"	1972	—	6	—		Lycka (2006 reissue)
"—" denotes the single failed to chart or was not released.

=== Björn and Benny albums ===
- 1970: Lycka
- 1984: Chess (concept album with Tim Rice)
- 1986: Chess Pieces
- 1988: Chess: Original Broadway Cast Recording
- 1994: Chess in Concert
- 1996: Kristina från Duvemåla
- 1998: Från Waterloo till Duvemåla
- 1999: 16 favoriter ur Kristina från Duvemåla
- 1999: Mamma Mia! (Original Cast Recording)
- 2000: Mamma Mia! (Original Broadway Cast Recording)
- 2002: Chess på svenska
- 2005: Mamma Mia! på svenska
- 2008: Mamma Mia! – The Movie Soundtrack
- 2009: Chess in Concert (London)
- 2010: Kristina at Carnegie Hall
- 2013: Hjälp sökes (English translation: Help Wanted)
- 2022: Pippi på Cirkus (English translation: Pippi at the Circus)

=== Gemini ===
- 1985: Gemini
- 1987: Geminism

=== Josefin Nilsson ===
- 1993: Shapes

== Musicals ==
- 1984 – Chess [sv]
- 1995 – Kristina från Duvemåla [sv]
- 1999 – Mamma Mia! [sv]
- 2013 – Help Wanted
- 2022 – Pippi at the Circus

== See also ==
- List of Swedes in music
- Abbacadabra

== Notes ==
Awards and achievements
Preceded by (Luxembourg) Anne-Marie David with "Tu te reconnaîtras"	Winner of the Eurovision Song Contest; 1974 (as part of ABBA)	Succeeded by (Netherlands) Teach-In with "Ding-A-Dong"
Preceded by Nova with "You're Summer"	Sweden in the Eurovision Song Contest; 1974 (as part of ABBA)	Succeeded by Lars Berghagen with "Jennie, Jennie"
