= Thank You for the Music (box set) =

- The original version's artwork. Cover for the 2008 re-issue was downsized.

Box set by ABBA
- Released: 31 October 1994
- Recorded: 1969–1982
- Genre: Pop
- Label: PolyGram
- Producers: Benny Andersson; Björn Ulvaeus

ABBA chronology
Oro: Grandes Éxitos (1993)	Thank You for the Music (1994)	Love Stories (1998)

Professional ratings
Review scores
Source	Rating
AllMusic	4.5/5 stars
The Encyclopedia of Popular Music	3/5 stars
Music Week	4/5 stars
Select	2/5 medals

Thank You for the Music is a box set by the Swedish pop group ABBA, released on 31 October 1994. It consists of 66 tracks across four discs, with the first three discs including all of the band's singles from 1972 to 1982, many B-sides, and some album tracks in chronological order; while the fourth disc includes some rarities and some previously unreleased material, most notably the 23-and-a-half minute long medley "ABBA Undeleted", which includes the track "Just a Notion", later released as part of Voyage in 2021. This box set marks the appearance of several ABBA tracks on compact disc for the first time.

In 2008 the Thank You for the Music box set was reissued in downsized packaging with a revised booklet.

== History ==
Plans for an ABBA box set had been floating around PolyGram's management since 1989, when they bought Stig Anderson's Polar Music group of companies and ABBA's entire catalogue along with them. In 1992, the box set project ended up being shelved in favour of a simple hits compilation. This idea became Gold: Greatest Hits, which became an unexpected success, launching ABBA back into the mainstream for the first time since the group split apart 10 years earlier. Gold was followed up by More ABBA Gold: More ABBA Hits in 1993 which marked the first look into ABBA's archive of unreleased tracks. Two completed tracks from ABBA's 1982 recording sessions – "Just Like That" and "I Am the City" – were brought out for inclusion on the disc, however, just "I Am the City" ended up being chosen. More ABBA Gold was also something of an unexpected success, and thus the box set idea was back on the table.

In late 1993, historian Carl Magnus Palm; ABBA members Björn Ulvaeus and Benny Andersson; and ABBA recording engineer Michael B. Tretow delved into ABBA's archives once again for some more unreleased tracks to include in the box set that would become Thank You for the Music. From the archives, just three songs would be released in full: an early take of the song "Thank You for the Music", from 1977 (sometimes called the "Doris Day" version); "Dream World", from 1979; and lastly "Put On Your White Sombrero", from 1980. No less than 15 other tracks that were rejected for inclusion in full were instead edited down into snippets and mixed together to create a medley titled "ABBA Undeleted", which also includes various sections of studio chatter from various recording sessions. One of the tracks, "Just a Notion", would later be re-recorded in full in ABBA's 2021 album Voyage.

== Track listing ==
All songs written and composed by Benny Andersson & Björn Ulvaeus, except where noted.

=== Disc 1 ===
Track release information taken from ABBA: The Complete Studio Recordings timeline booklet

No.	Title	Writer(s)	Length
1.	"People Need Love" (A-side, Polar POS 1156)		2:46
2.	"Another Town, Another Train" (Ring Ring)		3:13
3.	"He Is Your Brother" (A-side, Polar POS 1168)		3:19
4.	"Love Isn't Easy (But It Sure Is Hard Enough)" (Ring Ring)		2:55
5.	"Ring Ring" (A-side, Polar POS 1172)	Andersson, Stig Anderson, Ulvaeus, Neil Sedaka, Phil Cody	3:02
6.	"Waterloo" (A-side, Polar POS 1187)	Andersson, Anderson, Ulvaeus	2:44
7.	"Hasta Mañana" (Waterloo)	Andersson, Anderson, Ulvaeus	3:09
8.	"Honey, Honey" (Waterloo)	Andersson, Anderson, Ulvaeus	2:56
9.	"Dance (While the Music Still Goes On)" (Waterloo)		3:12
10.	"So Long" (A-side, Polar POS 1195)		3:05
11.	"I've Been Waiting for You" (B-side, Polar POS 1195)	Andersson, Anderson, Ulvaeus	3:38
12.	"I Do, I Do, I Do, I Do, I Do" (ABBA)	Andersson, Anderson, Ulvaeus	3:17
13.	"SOS" (ABBA)	Andersson, Anderson, Ulvaeus	3:21
14.	"Mamma Mia" (ABBA)	Andersson, Anderson, Ulvaeus	3:32
15.	"Fernando" (A-side, Polar POS 1224)	Andersson, Anderson, Ulvaeus	4:12
16.	"Dancing Queen" (A-side, Polar POS 1225)	Andersson, Anderson, Ulvaeus	3:50
17.	"That's Me" (B-side, Polar POS 1225)	Andersson, Anderson, Ulvaeus	3:16
18.	"When I Kissed the Teacher" (Arrival)		3:01
19.	"Money, Money, Money" (Arrival)		3:08
20.	"Crazy World" (B-side, Polar POS 1227)		3:49
21.	"My Love, My Life" (Arrival)	Andersson, Anderson, Ulvaeus	3:53

- Tracks 1–5 originally credited to Björn & Benny, Agnetha & Anni-Frid

=== Disc 2 ===
No.	Title	Writer(s)	Length
1.	"Knowing Me, Knowing You" (Arrival)	Andersson, Anderson, Ulvaeus	4:02
2.	"Happy Hawaii" (B-side, Polar POS 1230)	Andersson, Anderson, Ulvaeus	4:24
3.	"The Name of the Game" (US promo edit; A-Side, Atlantic 3449, full version appears on ABBA: The Album)	Andersson, Anderson, Ulvaeus	3:57
4.	"I Wonder (Departure) (live)" (B-side, Polar POS 1234)	Andersson, Anderson, Ulvaeus	4:26
5.	"Eagle" (ABBA: The Album)		5:49
6.	"Take a Chance on Me" (ABBA: The Album)		4:03
7.	"Thank You for the Music" (ABBA: The Album)		3:49
8.	"Summer Night City" (full-length version; previously unreleased)		4:14
9.	"Chiquitita" (A-side, Polar POS 1244)		5:26
10.	"Lovelight" (alternate mix; More ABBA Gold: More ABBA Hits, original version appears on 1999 re-release)		3:19
11.	"Does Your Mother Know" (Voulez-Vous)		3:15
12.	"Voulez-Vous" (edited version; ABBA Gold, full version appears on 1999 re-release)		4:19
13.	"Angeleyes" (Voulez-Vous)		4:18
14.	"Gimme! Gimme! Gimme! (A Man After Midnight)" (A-side, Polar POS 1256, early fade-out)		4:48
15.	"I Have a Dream" (Voulez-Vous)		4:44

=== Disc 3 ===
No.	Title	Length
1.	"The Winner Takes It All" (A-side, Polar POS 1274)	4:54
2.	"Elaine" (B-side, Polar POS 1274)	3:46
3.	"Super Trouper" (Super Trouper)	4:13
4.	"Lay All Your Love on Me" (Super Trouper)	4:33
5.	"On and On and On" (Super Trouper)	3:39
6.	"Our Last Summer" (Super Trouper)	4:18
7.	"The Way Old Friends Do" (Super Trouper)	2:53
8.	"The Visitors" (The Visitors)	5:48
9.	"One of Us" (The Visitors)	3:57
10.	"Should I Laugh or Cry" (B-side, Polar POS 1291)	4:27
11.	"Head over Heels" (The Visitors)	3:46
12.	"When All Is Said and Done" (The Visitors)	3:15
13.	"Like an Angel Passing Through My Room" (The Visitors)	3:36
14.	"The Day Before You Came" (A-side, Polar POS 1318)	5:49
15.	"Cassandra" (B-side, Polar POS 1318)	4:50
16.	"Under Attack" (The Singles: The First Ten Years)	3:44

=== Disc 4 ===
No.	Title	Writer(s)	Length
1.	"Put on Your White Sombrero" (outtake from Super Trouper; previously unreleased)		4:27
2.	"Dream World" (outtake from Voulez-Vous; previously unreleased)		3:36
3.	"Thank You for the Music" (Doris Day/early version; previously unreleased)		4:03
4.	"Hej Gamle Man!" (originally credited to Bjorn and Benny for their Swedish album Lycka, also notable for having backing vocals by Agnetha and Frida)		3:21
5.	"Merry-Go-Round" (B-side, Polar POS 1156)		3:20
6.	"Santa Rosa" (B-side, Polar POS 1168)		3:01
7.	"She's My Kind of Girl" (originally credited to Bjorn and Benny, written for and featured in the movie Inga II: The Seduction Of Inga; released as an ABBA song on Ring Ring)		2:44
8.	"Medley: Pick a Bale of Cotton – On Top of Old Smokey – Midnight Special" (Stars im Zeichen eines guten Sterns)	Traditional, arranged by Andersson, Ulvaeus	4:21
9.	"You Owe Me One" (B-side, Polar POS 1321)		3:25
10.	"Slipping Through My Fingers / Me and I" (live; from the TV special Dick Cavett Meets ABBA, 1981; previously unreleased)		8:37
11.	"ABBA Undeleted: Scaramouche / Summer Night City (early version) / Take a Chance on Me (early instrumental version) / Baby (early version of "Rock Me") / Just a Notion / Rikky Rock 'n' Roller / Burning My Bridges / Fernando (early Swedish solo version by Frida) / Here Comes Rubie Jamie / Hamlet III Part 1 & 2 / Free as a Bumble Bee / Rubber Ball Man / Crying Over You / Just Like That / Givin' a Little Bit More" (outtake medley; previously unreleased)	Andersson, Anderson, Ulvaeus	23:30
12.	"Waterloo" (French/Swedish version medley; both versions previously released separately)	Andersson, Anderson, Ulvaeus, Alain Boublil	2:40
13.	"Ring Ring" (Swedish/Spanish/German version; Swedish and German versions previously released as singles, while the Spanish version was first released in 1993 on the compilation Más ABBA Oro: Más ABBA Éxitos)	Andersson, Anderson, Ulvaeus, Doris Band, Peter Lach	4:21
14.	"Honey, Honey" (Swedish version, B-side, Polar POS 1186)	Andersson, Anderson, Ulvaeus	2:57

== Personnel ==
ABBA

- Benny Andersson – synthesizer, keyboards, vocals
- Agnetha Fältskog – vocals
- Anni-Frid Lyngstad – vocals
- Björn Ulvaeus – acoustic guitar, [uitar, vocals

Additional personnel

- Ulf Andersson – saxophone
- Ola Brunkert – drums
- Lars Carlsson – horn
- Christer Eklund – saxophone
- Malando Gassama – percussion
- Anders Glenmark – guitar
- Rutger Gunnarsson – bass
- Roger Palm – drums
- Janne Schaffer – guitar
- Åke Sundqvist – percussion
- Mike Watson – bass
- Lasse Wellander – guitar

== Production ==
- Producers: Benny Andersson, Björn Ulvaeus
- Arrangers: Benny Andersson, Björn Ulvaeus
- Engineer: Michael B. Tretow
- Design: Icon, London
- Liner notes: Carl Magnus Palm
