= ABBA Gold =

ABBA Gold: Greatest Hits

Greatest hits album by ABBA
- Released: 21 September 1992
- Recorded: December 1973 – October 1981
- Genre: Europop
- Length: 76:40 (1992); 79:08 (1999–present)
- Labels: PolyGram (1992–1997); Universal (1998–present)
- Producers: Benny Andersson; Björn Ulvaeus

ABBA chronology
ABBA Live (1986)	ABBA Gold: Greatest Hits (1992)	More ABBA Gold: More ABBA Hits (1993)

Singles from ABBA Gold: Greatest Hits
- 1. "Dancing Queen" Released: 24 August 1992; 2. "Voulez-Vous" Released: 26 October 1992; 3. "Thank You for the Music" Released: November 1992

ABBA Gold: Greatest Hits is a compilation album by the Swedish pop group ABBA. It was released on 21 September 1992 through PolyGram, making it the first compilation to be released after the company had acquired Polar Music, and thus the rights to the ABBA back catalogue.

With sales of 30 million, Gold: Greatest Hits is the best-selling ABBA album, as well as one of the best-selling albums worldwide. Since 1992, it has been re-released several times, most notably in 1999 as the first remastered reissue to mark the group's 25th anniversary of winning the Eurovision Song Contest 1974, in 2008 to coincide with the release of the film Mamma Mia!, in 2014 to mark the group's 40th anniversary of winning the Eurovision Song Contest, and most recently in 2022 to commemorate the album's 30th anniversary.

== Background and Overview ==
In 1989, Stig Anderson, ABBA's manager and sometime songwriting partner, sold Polar Music to PolyGram (which was bought by Universal Music in the late '90s). Before that, Polar had only produced and distributed ABBA's records in Scandinavian countries, licensing the recordings for release by different companies around the world (such as Atlantic in the US and Epic in the UK). This meant there were many different compilations released in different parts of the world. As these licenses were renewed every three years, between 1989 and 1992, PolyGram waited for these licenses to expire before releasing any new ABBA compilations. PolyGram made all of the original studio albums available (along with the 1986 live album which had originally been issued by Polydor worldwide), while all previously released ABBA compilations had been deleted.

In the summer of 1992, Erasure had released a 4 track ABBA cover EP, titled Abba-esque, which topped charts around the world and showed that there was still a strong interest in ABBA's music. Rather than issue the multiple previous compilations, PolyGram put together a new collection, optimized for the CD format.

This new release was compiled by PolyGram International's Chris Griffin and Jackie Stansfield, Polydor UK's George McManus, Ingemar Bergman of Sweden Music and Polar in Sweden, and music journalist John Tobler, who also wrote the album's liner notes. Chris Griffin tried to sequence the tracks as if it were a radio show: the album starts with "Dancing Queen", the band's most famous song, and then journeys through ballads, fun hits and dance classics, before it ends with "Waterloo", a nod to the group's international breakthrough in the 1974 Eurovision Song Contest.

The album contains a selection of at least one track from every album in ABBA's discography up until that point (other than their debut album, Ring Ring) including three tracks each from Arrival, ABBA: The Album and Super Trouper, four from Voulez-Vous, two from ABBA, and one each from Waterloo and The Visitors. Additionally, it features the singles "Fernando" and "Gimme! Gimme! Gimme! (A Man After Midnight)", released on Greatest Hits and Greatest Hits Vol. 2, respectively.

Gold: Greatest Hits was well received by the music-buying public, and went on to be one of the best-selling albums of all time.

== Release ==
ABBA Gold: Greatest Hits was released on September 21, 1992. It has been re-released in various "special" or "remastered" releases:

Year	Edition	Notes
1992	Original release	The original 1992 release included an edited version of "Voulez-Vous" and the US promo edit of "The Name of the Game".
1999	Remastered reissue	Released, with new liner notes, to coincide with ABBA's 25th anniversary of winning the Eurovision Song Contest with "Waterloo". It included the original versions of "Voulez-Vous" and "The Name of the Game". This new version was called the "signature series", as it came with autographs from the band members embedded into the front plastic casing with gold writing. This edition also contained new sleeve notes and was digitally remastered in 24 bit from the original multitracks.
2002	10th anniversary reissue	Released for the album's 10th anniversary, this edition contained a revised booklet and updated liner notes. The ABBA logo was changed to the official ABBA font and the back cover was redesigned. It was released in Europe and New Zealand (with the European track list, and not the previous Australasian track list). This version was not released in Australia.
2008	Second remastered edition	Released to coincide with the release of the film Mamma Mia!, in a so-called super jewel case, with updated liner notes and with remastered sound (using the remasters for The Complete Studio Recordings). The Australasian release featured the European track list, not the Australasian track list on previous issues. This version was issued in the US in 2010, with a regular jewel case instead.
2010	CD/DVD Special Edition	Released on December 6, 2010. It included two discs: the original CD (with the latest remastered version of the album) and a DVD of all the video clips, newly remastered. The DVD also included six bonus videos: five "before-and-after" split-screen comparisons between the original and the remastered versions of certain clips, and, particularly, a cartoon version of "Money, Money, Money", made circa 1977 by the Australian Reg Grundy Organisation. It was only ever screened briefly and had never been seen in complete form until this edition.
2014	40th Anniversary Edition	A three-CD digi-pack set released as part of the celebrations for the band's 40th anniversary Eurovision victory. It included the original album (disc one), the More ABBA Gold: More ABBA Hits album (disc two) and 20 B-sides (disc three). It was reissued by Universal on October 14 of the same year with a special gold steel box packaging and a magnetic lenticular cover.
2022	30th anniversary reissue	Released on September 23, 2022, for the album's 30th anniversary. This release was issued in two formats: a gold-colored vinyl or picture disc double-LP package, and a gold or black limited edition cassette, available through certain channels.

=== Regional variations and tie-ins ===
Australian editions:

- The 1992 and 1999 editions released in Australia and New Zealand (and some other territories in that area) had a modified track listing to include three local hits, replacing three other songs on the international edition.
- The 2002 re-release was not released in Australia, while in New Zealand, the international edition was issued.
- From 2008 onwards, only the international editions have been released in Australia and New Zealand.

Spanish versions:

- The original 1992 release had a slightly different track listing, replacing the English versions of "Chiquitita" and "Fernando" with the Spanish language versions.
- Shortly after the release of Gold: Greatest Hits, a Spanish version of the album, titled Oro: Grandes Exitos, was issued, followed later by Mas Oro: Mas ABBA Exitos.

Video and DVD:

- In 1992 a VHS video was released which included all tracks from the original album. During the 1990s, various regional variations on this video were issued, until Universal Music decided in 2003 to re-issue the video on VHS and DVD. The track listing was similar to the original album, with some added content: a 25-minute documentary produced in 1999, and the 1992 video of "Dancing Queen".
- In 2010, the DVD was remastered with six bonus clips, including five "split-screen" versions of the clips to show which improvements were made by remastering the old videos. These "split-screen" clips were "Gimme! Gimme! Gimme!", "Mamma Mia", "Dancing Queen", "The Winner Takes It All" and "Money, Money, Money". The sixth bonus clip was an Australian cartoon version of "Money, Money, Money". The 2010 edition did not include the 2003 ABBA documentary or the 1992 version of "Dancing Queen". This disc was available as a stand-alone DVD and as part of the 2010 'Special Edition' re-release.

Other variations:

- In 2002, Gold: Greatest Hits was released in mainland Europe (though not in the UK) with a bonus second disc.
- The UK saw a 30th Anniversary Edition released in 2004 with a gold-coloured sleeve cover with black writing, rather than the normal black sleeve with gold writing. The original release included a DVD with 18 of the 19 songs from the CD, excluding "The Name of the Game". It is also available without the DVD.

== Critical reception ==
Professional ratings
Review scores
Source	Rating
AllMusic	5/5 stars
Encyclopedia of Popular Music	4/5 stars
The Great Rock Discography	6/10
Philadelphia Inquirer	4/4 stars
Pitchfork	8.3/10
Select	5/5 stars

Gold: Greatest Hits has been called one of the most influential compilation albums ever released. Music critic Elisabeth Vincentelli (New York Post; Time Out New York) credits the album for a revival of critical interest in ABBA's music after ten years of neglect following the band's 1982 break-up.

Writing for Pitchfork in 2019, reviewer Jamieson Cox agreed, describing Gold: Greatest Hits as a "refined package with surprising emotional range". The album, he wrote, "capitalized on a simmering, subcultural interest in ABBA's work and sparked a full-blown revival" that culminated in the Mamma Mia! stage and film productions.

BuzzFeed music editor Matthew Perpetua included Gold: Greatest Hits among the compilations he considered "so well curated in presenting a fertile period of a career that they are arguably an artist's definitive work".

Former Rolling Stone magazine writer Tom Moon included Gold: Greatest Hits among his 1,000 Recordings to Hear Before You Die, describing the tracks as "models of impeccable craft", adding that the album is "an excellent starter kit for those wanting to investigate the DNA of post-Beatles pop."

Writing for Vanity Fair, singer-songwriter Elvis Costello included Gold: Greatest Hits among his list of 500 essential albums.

== Commercial performance ==
With pure sales of 5.61 million copies, Gold: Greatest Hits is the second-highest selling album of all time in the United Kingdom, after Queen's Greatest Hits. It is the best-selling album on compact disc in the UK, having sold over 4.04 million copies on that format. In August, 2019, Gold: Greatest Hits became the longest-running top 100 album of all time, spending 900 weeks on the UK Albums Chart. The album spent 61 (non-consecutive) weeks in the top 10 and topped the British chart 5 times, most recently for two weeks in 2008 following the release of the motion picture Mamma Mia! As of July 2021, Gold became the first album to reach 1000 weeks on the Official Charts in the United Kingdom. In October 2026, it was awarded 23× Platinum by the British Phonographic Industry, denoting 6.9 million album-equivalent unit in the UK.

In the United States, the album has sold a total of 5.8 million copies and is the nineteenth biggest-selling greatest-hits album in the Nielsen Music era. In Canada, Gold: Greatest Hits achieved Diamond status (one million units sold) in May, 2000.

In Germany, Gold: Greatest Hits has been certified five times Platinum for shipment of 2.5 million units. It has also been certified 10 times Platinum in Switzerland for sales of 500,000 units. In Austria, the album charted for 397 weeks, making it the all-time second longest stay on the chart. After reaching catalogue status, it returned to the top 10 three times, twice in the wake of the releases of Mamma Mia! The Movie Soundtrack and Mamma Mia! Here We Go Again and once due to the release of a special edition.

== Track listing ==
All tracks are written by Benny Andersson and Björn Ulvaeus, except where noted.

Original 1992 release
No.	Title	Writer(s)	Original album	Length
1.	"Dancing Queen"	Andersson; Stig Anderson; Ulvaeus	Arrival (1976)	3:49
2.	"Knowing Me, Knowing You"	Andersson; Anderson; Ulvaeus	Arrival	4:01
3.	"Take a Chance on Me"		ABBA: The Album (1977)	4:01
4.	"Mamma Mia"	Andersson; Anderson; Ulvaeus	ABBA (1975)	3:32
5.	"Lay All Your Love on Me"		Super Trouper (1980)	4:32
6.	"Super Trouper"		Super Trouper	4:10
7.	"I Have a Dream"		Voulez-Vous (1979)	4:43
8.	"The Winner Takes It All"		Super Trouper	4:54
9.	"Money, Money, Money"		Arrival	3:05
10.	"SOS"	Andersson; Anderson; Ulvaeus	ABBA	3:19
11.	"Chiquitita"		Voulez-Vous	5:26
12.	"Fernando"	Andersson; Anderson; Ulvaeus	Greatest Hits (1976)	4:10
13.	"Voulez-Vous"		Voulez-Vous	4:21
14.	"Gimme! Gimme! Gimme! (A Man After Midnight)"		Greatest Hits Vol. 2 (1979)	4:46
15.	"Does Your Mother Know"		Voulez-Vous	3:14
16.	"One of Us"		The Visitors (1981)	3:53
17.	"The Name of the Game"	Andersson; Anderson; Ulvaeus	ABBA: The Album	3:56
18.	"Thank You for the Music"		ABBA: The Album	3:51
19.	"Waterloo"	Andersson; Anderson; Ulvaeus	Waterloo (1974)	2:42
Total length:				1:16:25

=== 40th anniversary edition ===
A three-CD set released on April 7, 2014, as part of the celebration for the 40th anniversary of ABBA's Eurovision victory. Disc one consisted of the original album, disc two of the album More ABBA Gold: More ABBA Hits, and disc three of B-sides.

The information on disc three has been adapted from the 40th anniversary reissue's cover. All tracks are written by Benny Andersson and Björn Ulvaeus, except where noted.

Disc three: B-Sides
No.	Title	Writer(s)	A-side	Length
1.	"She's My Kind of Girl"		"Ring Ring" (1973)	2:45
2.	"I Am Just a Girl"	Andersson; Stig Anderson; Ulvaeus	"Love Isn't Easy (But It Sure Is Hard Enough)" (1973)	3:02
3.	"Gonna Sing You My Lovesong"		"Waterloo (French version)" (1974)	3:37
4.	"King Kong Song"		"Honey, Honey" (1974)	3:12
5.	"I've Been Waiting for You"	Andersson; Anderson; Ulvaeus	"So Long" (1974)	3:40
6.	"Rock Me"		"I Do, I Do, I Do, I Do, I Do" (1975)	3:04
7.	"Man in the Middle"		"SOS" (1975)	3:01
8.	"Intermezzo No. 1"		"Mamma Mia" (1975)	3:46
9.	"That's Me"	Andersson; Anderson; Ulvaeus	"Dancing Queen" (1976)	3:15
10.	"Crazy World"		"Money, Money, Money" (1976)	3:44
11.	"Happy Hawaii"	Andersson; Anderson; Ulvaeus	"Knowing Me, Knowing You" (1977)	4:23
12.	"I'm a Marionette"		"Take a Chance on Me" (1978)	4:04
13.	"Medley: Pick a Bale of Cotton / On Top of Old Smokey / Midnight Special"	Traditional; arranged by Andersson and Ulvaeus	"Summer Night City" (1978)	4:19
14.	"Kisses of Fire"		"Does Your Mother Know" (1979)	3:16
15.	"The King Has Lost His Crown"		"Gimme! Gimme! Gimme! (A Man After Midnight)" (1979)	3:32
16.	"Elaine"		"The Winner Takes It All" (1980)	3:44
17.	"The Piper"		"Super Trouper" (1980)	3:26
18.	"Andante, Andante"		"Happy New Year" (1980)	4:40
19.	"Should I Laugh or Cry"		"One of Us" (1981)	4:30
20.	"Soldiers"		"When All Is Said and Done" (1981)	4:40
Total length:				1:13:40

== Personnel ==
ABBA

- Agnetha Fältskog – vocals
- Anni-Frid Lyngstad – vocals
- Björn Ulvaeus – steel-string, acoustic guitar, vocals
- Benny Andersson – synthesizer, keyboards, vocals

Production

- Benny Andersson, Björn Ulvaeus – producers
- Michael B. Tretow – engineer, digital remastering (1992 edition)
- Jon Astley – digital remastering (1999, 2002, 2004 reissues)
- Henrik Jonsson – digital remastering (2008 reissue)
- Chris Griffin – compilation
- Jackie Stansfield – compilation
- George McManus – compilation
- John Waller – compilation
- Ingemar Bergman – compilation
- John Tobler – 1992 liner notes, compilation
- Icon – design
- Carl Magnus Palm – liner notes (1999, 2002, 2004, 2008 reissues)

== Charts ==
=== Weekly charts ===
Weekly chart performance for ABBA Gold
Chart (1992–2026)	Peak position
Australian Albums (ARIA)	1
Austrian Albums (Ö3 Austria)	1
Belgian Albums (Ultratop Flanders)	5
Belgian Albums (Ultratop Wallonia)	16
Canada Top Albums/CDs (RPM)	4
Canadian Albums (Billboard)	15
Croatian International Albums (HDU)	7
Czech Albums (ČNS IFPI)	30
Danish Albums (Hitlisten)	5
Dutch Albums (Album Top 100)	3
European Albums (Music & Media)	1
Finnish Albums (Suomen virallinen lista)	1
French Albums (SNEP)	5
German Albums (Offizielle Top 100)	1
Greece Albums (Billboard)	10
Greek Albums (IFPI)	1
Hungarian Albums (MAHASZ)	10
Irish Albums (IRMA)	1
Italian Albums (Musica e dischi)	2
Japanese Albums (Oricon)	13
Japanese Albums (Oricon) 10th anniversary edition	12
Mexican Albums (Top 100 Mexico)	69
New Zealand Albums (RMNZ)	3
Norwegian Albums (VG-lista)	1
Polish Albums (ZPAV)	4
Portuguese Albums (AFP)	1
Scottish Albums (Official Charts)	1
Spanish Albums (AFYVE)	1
Swedish Albums (Sverigetopplistan)	1
Swiss Albums (Schweizer Hitparade)	1
Swiss Albums (Les charts Romandy)	4
UK Albums (Official Charts)	1
Uruguayan International Albums (CUD)	5
US Billboard 200	25
US Top Catalog Albums (Billboard)	1
US Top Dance Albums (Billboard)	1

=== Year-end charts ===
Year-end chart performance for ABBA Gold
Chart (1992)	Position
Australian Albums (ARIA)	12
Dutch Albums (MegaCharts)	20
European Albums (Music & Media)	26
German Albums (Offizielle Top 100)	32
New Zealand Albums (RMNZ)	49
Swiss Albums (Schweizer Hitparade)	39
UK Albums (OCC)	12

Chart (1993)	Position
Australian Albums (ARIA)	95
Austrian Albums (Ö3 Austria)	6
Canada Top Albums/CDs (RPM)	35
Dutch Albums (MegaCharts)	4
European Albums (Music & Media)	13
German Albums (Offizielle Top 100)	9
Swiss Albums (Schweizer Hitparade)	5
UK Albums (OCC)	36

Chart (1994)	Position
Australian Albums (ARIA)	9

Chart (1995)	Position
Australian Albums (ARIA)	45
New Zealand Albums (RMNZ)	15

Chart (1996)	Position
UK Albums (OCC)	89

Chart (1997)	Position
UK Albums (OCC)	100

Chart (1998)	Position
UK Albums (OCC)	55

Chart (1999)	Position
Australian Albums (ARIA) 25th anniversary edition	8
Belgian Albums (Ultratop Flanders)	33
Belgian Albums (Ultratop Wallonia)	38
European Albums (Music & Media)	10
UK Albums (OCC)	4

Chart (2000)	Position
Canadian Albums (Nielsen SoundScan)	48
South Korean International Albums (MIAK)	5
UK Albums (OCC)	41

Chart (2001)	Position
Canadian Albums (Nielsen SoundScan)	79
UK Albums (OCC)	148

Chart (2002)	Position
Canadian Albums (Nielsen SoundScan)	124

Chart (2003)	Position
UK Albums (OCC)	193

Chart (2004)	Position
UK Albums (OCC)	47

Chart (2005)	Position
UK Albums (OCC)	118

Chart (2006)	Position
UK Albums (OCC)	194

Chart (2007)	Position
UK Albums (OCC)	166

Chart (2008)	Position
Australian Albums (ARIA)	39
Austrian Albums (Ö3 Austria)	62
Dutch Albums (MegaCharts)	94
European Albums (Billboard)	42
Hungarian Albums (MAHASZ)	66
New Zealand Albums (RMNZ)	46
Swedish Albums (Sverigetopplistan)	93
Swiss Albums (Schweizer Hitparade)	66
UK Albums (OCC)	19
US Top Catalog Albums (Billboard)	23

Chart (2009)	Position
European Albums (Billboard)	80
Swiss Albums (Schweizer Hitparade)	71
UK Albums (OCC)	54
US Top Catalog Albums (Billboard)	8

Chart (2010)	Position
UK Albums (OCC)	90
US Top Catalog Albums (Billboard)	20

Chart (2011)	Position
UK Albums (OCC)	130

Chart (2012)	Position
Austrian Albums (Ö3 Austria)	47
UK Albums (OCC)	140

Chart (2013)	Position
Austrian Albums (Ö3 Austria)	64
Swedish Albums (Sverigetopplistan)	34
UK Albums (OCC)	119

Chart (2014)	Position
Australian Albums (ARIA)	88
Austrian Albums (Ö3 Austria)	11
Danish Albums (Hitlisten)	17
German Albums (Offizielle Top 100)	47
New Zealand Albums (RMNZ)	46
Swedish Albums (Sverigetopplistan)	48
Swiss Albums (Schweizer Hitparade)	24

Chart (2015)	Position
Austrian Albums (Ö3 Austria)	39
Danish Albums (Hitlisten)	96
Swedish Albums (Sverigetopplistan)	56
Swiss Albums (Schweizer Hitparade)	67
UK Albums (OCC)	79

Chart (2016)	Position
Austrian Albums (Ö3 Austria)	55
Icelandic Albums (Plötutíóindi)	73
Swiss Albums (Schweizer Hitparade)	82
Swedish Albums (Sverigetopplistan)	64
UK Albums (OCC)	72

Chart (2017)	Position
Austrian Albums (Ö3 Austria)	47
UK Albums (OCC)	77

Chart (2018)	Position
Australian Albums (ARIA)	60
Austrian Albums (Ö3 Austria)	15
Irish Albums (IRMA)	12
Swiss Albums (Schweizer Hitparade)	40
UK Albums (OCC)	20

Chart (2019)	Position
Austrian Albums (Ö3 Austria)	50
Belgian Albums (Ultratop Flanders)	63
Belgian Albums (Ultratop Wallonia)	175
Irish Albums (IRMA)	22
Polish Albums (ZPAV)	52
Swiss Albums (Schweizer Hitparade)	58
UK Albums (OCC)	32

Chart (2020)	Position
Austrian Albums (Ö3 Austria)	43
Belgian Albums (Ultratop Flanders)	62
Irish Albums (IRMA)	19
Swiss Albums (Schweizer Hitparade)	75
UK Albums (OCC)	19

Chart (2021)	Position
Austrian Albums (Ö3 Austria)	16
Belgian Albums (Ultratop Flanders)	38
Belgian Albums (Ultratop Wallonia)	156
German Albums (Offizielle Top 100)	69
Irish Albums (IRMA)	7
Swiss Albums (Schweizer Hitparade)	27
UK Albums (OCC)	13
US Billboard 200	158

Chart (2022)	Position
Belgian Albums (Ultratop Flanders)	65
Canadian Albums (Billboard)	43
German Albums (Offizielle Top 100)	48
Swiss Albums (Schweizer Hitparade)	36
UK Albums (OCC)	10
US Billboard 200	96

Chart (2023)	Position
Austrian Albums (Ö3 Austria)	53
Belgian Albums (Ultratop Flanders)	63
Belgian Albums (Ultratop Wallonia)	195
Canadian Albums (Billboard)	35
Swiss Albums (Schweizer Hitparade)	75
UK Albums (OCC)	10
US Billboard 200	98

Chart (2024)	Position
Austrian Albums (Ö3 Austria)	32
Belgian Albums (Ultratop Flanders)	82
Canadian Albums (Billboard)	42
Swiss Albums (Schweizer Hitparade)	60
UK Albums (OCC)	14
US Billboard 200	112

Chart (2025)	Position
Belgian Albums (Ultratop Flanders)	200
Canadian Albums (Billboard)	49
Swiss Albums (Schweizer Hitparade)	70
UK Albums (OCC)	19
US Billboard 200	121
US Top Dance Albums (Billboard)	4

=== Decade-end charts ===
Chart (2010–2019)	Position
UK Albums (OCC)	46

== Certifications and sales ==
Certifications for "ABBA Gold (album)"
Region	Certification	Certified units/sales
Argentina (CAPIF)	3× Platinum	180,000^{^}
Australia (ARIA)	17× Platinum	1,190,000^{^}
Austria (IFPI Austria)	3× Platinum	150,000^{*}
Belgium (BRMA)	7× Platinum	350,000^{*}
Brazil (Pro-Música Brasil)	Gold	100,000^{*}
Canada (Music Canada)	Diamond	1,000,000^{^}
Chile	3× Platinum	75,000
Czech Republic	Platinum	50,000
Croatia (HDU)	Silver	
Denmark (IFPI Danmark)	7× Platinum	560,000^{^}
Finland (Musiikkituottajat)	2× Platinum	145,962
France (SNEP)	Diamond	1,000,000^{*}
Germany (BVMI)	5× Platinum	2,500,000^{^}
Hong Kong (IFPI Hong Kong)	4× Platinum	80,000^{*}
Hungary (MAHASZ)	Platinum	
Iceland	Gold	5,000
Ireland (IRMA)	4× Platinum	60,000^{^}
Israel	Platinum	
Italy (FIMI) 1992–1996 sales	3× Gold	150,000^{*}
Italy sales in 2008	—	50,000
Italy (FIMI) sales + streams since 2009	3× Platinum	150,000^{‡}
Japan (RIAJ)	3× Platinum	750,000^{^}
Malaysia	3× Platinum	75,000
Mexico (AMPROFON)	2× Platinum	500,000^{^}
Netherlands (NVPI)	3× Platinum	300,000^{^}
New Zealand (RMNZ)	16× Platinum	240,000^{^}
Norway (IFPI Norway)	2× Platinum	100,000^{*}
Poland (ZPAV)	Platinum	100,000^{*}
Portugal (AFP) original release	Platinum	40,000^{^}
Portugal (AFP) for 2008 release	Platinum	20,000^{^}
Russia (NFPF)	Gold	10,000^{*}
Singapore	—	120,000
South Africa (RISA)	Platinum	50,000^{*}
South Korea	—	255,947
Spain (Promusicae)	5× Platinum	500,000^{^}
Sweden (GLF)	5× Platinum	500,000^{^}
Switzerland (IFPI Switzerland)	10× Platinum	500,000^{^}
Taiwan (RIT)	7× Platinum	350,000
United Kingdom (BPI)	23× Platinum	6,900,000^{‡}
United States (RIAA)	6× Platinum	6,684,000
Venezuela	Silver	
Zimbabwe	Gold	
Summaries
Europe 1992–1993 sales	—	5,600,000
Worldwide	—	30,000,000
^{*} Sales figures based on certification alone.^{^} Shipments figures based on certification alone.

Certifications for "ABBA Gold (Anniversary Edition)"
Region	Certification	Certified units/sales
Australia (ARIA)	Platinum	70,000^{^}
Austria (IFPI Austria)	Gold	7,500^{*}
Poland (ZPAV)	Gold	10,000^{‡}
^{*} Sales figures based on certification alone.^{^} Shipments figures based on certification alone.^{‡} Sales+streaming figures based on certification alone.

Certifications for "ABBA Gold (video album)"
Region	Certification	Certified units/sales
Australia (ARIA)	3× Platinum	45,000^{^}
Canada (Music Canada)	Platinum	10,000^{^}
Germany (BVMI)	Platinum	50,000^{^}
New Zealand (RMNZ)	Platinum	5,000^{^}
United States (RIAA) (Polydor Edition)	Platinum	100,000^{^}
United States (RIAA) (Polygram Edition)	Gold	50,000^{^}
^{^} Shipments figures based on certification alone.

== See also ==
- List of best-selling albums
- List of best-selling albums by country
- List of best-selling albums in Australia
- List of best-selling albums in Austria
- List of best-selling albums in Europe
- List of best-selling albums in France
- List of best-selling albums in Finland
- List of best-selling albums in Germany
- List of best-selling albums in New Zealand
- List of best-selling albums in Switzerland
- List of best-selling albums in the United Kingdom
