= Oro: Grandes Éxitos =

1992 compilation album by ABBA

ABBA Oro: Grandes Éxitos

Greatest hits album by ABBA
- Released: 24 September 1993
- Recorded: 1973, 1979 – 1981
- Genre: Pop
- Length: 42:02 (1993 original release); 61:34 (reissue release)
- Label: Polydor; Universal Music (Re-release)
- Producer: Benny Andersson; Björn Ulvaeus

ABBA chronology
More ABBA Gold: More ABBA Hits (1993)	ABBA Oro: Grandes Éxitos (1993)	Thank You for the Music (1994)

Alternative cover
- 1999 re-release

Professional ratings
Review scores
Source	Rating
Allmusic	2/5 stars

ABBA Oro: Grandes Éxitos is a greatest hits compilation album by the Swedish recording group ABBA, released on 24 September 1993 in the United States via Polydor Records. It included the songs the group recorded in Spanish, acting as the Spanish equivalent of their ABBA Gold (1992) album. The original release featured all ten songs that were originally released on their compilation album Gracias Por La Música (1980). It was a success in Argentina, where it was certified Gold by the Argentine Chamber of Phonograms and Videograms Producers.

Oro was followed by ABBA Mas Oro: Mas ABBA Exitos, which was released on 12 July 1994, exclusively in the United States. This re-issue included five English-language songs in addition to five "new" tracks in Spanish. The "new" tracks included were the Spanish versions of "Andante, Andante", "Happy New Year" ("Felicidad"), "When All Is Said and Done" ("No Hay a Quien Culpar"), and "Slipping Through My Fingers" ("Se Me Está Escapando"), which all appeared on the South American and Spanish versions of Super Trouper or The Visitors, and the previously unreleased "Ring Ring", which had been recorded in 1973, but was left in Polar Music's archives for nearly twenty years.

In 1999, all 15 tracks were finally collected in Spanish on one CD in the international re-issue of Oro. At that time the recordings were also digitally remastered in 24 bit. In 2002 this version of Oro was re-released, featuring updated artwork and new liner notes.

== Chart reception ==
ABBA Oro debuted on the Billboard Top Latin Albums chart the week of 11 December 1993, at number 38, making it the first time a Swedish act appeared on the chart. It peaked at number 37 on the chart two weeks later, and stayed for a total of seven weeks. It also appeared on the Latin Pop Albums chart for one week at number 15, on 25 December 1993.

== Track listing ==
All songs written and composed by Benny Andersson & Björn Ulvaeus, except where noted.

1992 release
No.	Title	Writer(s)	Length
1.	"Fernando" (Spanish Version)	Benny Andersson; Stig Anderson; Björn Ulvaeus	4:06
2.	"Chiquitita" (Spanish Version)		5:21
3.	"Gracias Por La Musica" ("Thank You for the Music")		3:48
4.	"La Reina Del Baile" ("Dancing Queen")	Andersson; Anderson; Ulvaeus	3:48
5.	"Al Andar" ("Move On")		4:41
6.	"Dame! Dame! Dame!" ("Gimme! Gimme! Gimme!")		4:49
7.	"Estoy Soñando" ("I Have a Dream")		4:35
8.	"Mamma Mia" (Spanish Version)	Andersson; Anderson; Ulvaeus	3:32
9.	"Hasta Mañana" (Spanish Version)	Andersson; Anderson; Ulvaeus	3:08
10.	"Conociéndome, Conociéndote" ("Knowing Me, Knowing You")	Andersson; Anderson; Ulvaeus	4:01
Total length:			42:02

ABBA Mas Oro: Mas ABBA Exitos track listing
No.	Title	Writer(s)	Length
1.	"Chiquitita" (English Version)		5:21
2.	"Fernando" (English Version)	Andersson; Anderson; Ulvaeus	4:06
3.	"Dancing Queen"	Andersson; Anderson; Ulvaeus	4:01
4.	"Knowing Me, Knowing You"	Andersson; Anderson; Ulvaeus	4:01
5.	"Mamma Mia" (English Version)	Andersson; Anderson; Ulvaeus	3:32
6.	"Felicidad" ("Happy New Year")		4:23
7.	"Andante, Andante" (Spanish Version)		4:37
8.	"Se Me Está Escapando" ("Slipping Through My Fingers")		3:50
9.	"No Hay A Quien Culpar" ("When All Is Said and Done")		3:12
10.	"Ring Ring" (Spanish Version)	Andersson; Anderson; Ulvaeus	2:58
Total length:			40:01

=== Bonus tracks 1999 re-release ===
11. "Felicidad" ("Happy New Year") – 4:24
12. "Andante, Andante" (Spanish version) – 4:39
13. "Se Me Está Escapando" ("Slipping Through My Fingers") – 3:52
14. "No Hay a Quien Culpar" ("When All Is Said and Done") – 3:13
15. "Ring, Ring" (Spanish Version) (written by Andersson, Anderson, Ulvaeus) – 3:00

(P) 1973 (15) / 1979 (2, 7) / 1980 (1, 3 – 6, 8 – 12) / 1981 ( 13–14) Polar Music International AB

- The Spanish version of "Dancing Queen" was originally entitled "Reina Danzante", but was retitled "La Reina del Baile" when Oro was released.
- Songs 1 – 14 in Spanish translation by Buddy and Mary McCluskey.
- Song 15 in Spanish translation by Doris Band.

== Personnel ==
- Agnetha Fältskog – lead vocals (2, 3, 5, 6, 9, 11, 13), co-lead vocals (4, 8, 15), backing vocals
- Anni-Frid Lyngstad – lead vocals (1, 7, 10, 12, 14), co-lead vocals (4, 8, 15), backing vocals
- Björn Ulvaeus – acoustic guitar, backing vocals
- Benny Andersson – synthesizer, keyboards, backing vocals

== Charts ==
Chart (1993)	Peak position
US Top Latin Albums (Billboard)	37
US Latin Pop Albums (Billboard)	15

== Certifications and sales ==
Region	Certification	Certified units/sales
Argentina (CAPIF)	Gold	30,000^{^}
^{^} Shipments figures based on certification alone.
