= Gracias Por La Música =

1980 ABBA album

Compilation album by ABBA
- Released: 5 April 1980 (Spain); 10 May 1980 (Argentina); 23 June 1980 (Sweden); 21 July 1980 (Japan)
- Recorded: March 1979, August 1979, & January 1980; 2014 deluxe edition additions: July 1973, October 1980, November 1981
- Studio: Metronome, Stockholm, Sweden; Mike's Studio, Sollentuna; Polar, Stockholm, Sweden
- Genre: Pop
- Length: 43:00
- Label: Septima (Scandinavia); RCA Victor
- Producer: Benny Andersson; Björn Ulvaeus

ABBA chronology
Greatest Hits Vol. 2 (1979)	Gracias Por La Música (1980)	Super Trouper (1980)

Singles from Gracias Por La Musica
- 1. "Chiquitita (Spanish Version)" Released: April 1979; 2. "Estoy Soñando" Released: September 1979; 3. "Dame, Dame, Dame" Released: 29 February 1980; 4. "Gracias Por La Musica" Released: March 1980; 5. "Hasta Mañana (Spanish Version)" Released: 1980 (Peru, Bolivia, Argentina and Chile); 6. "Fernando (Spanish Version)" Released: 1980 (USA and Argentina); 7. "Mamma Mia (Spanish Version)" Released: 1981 (USA); 8. "Al Andar" Released: 1982 (Argentina)

Gracias Por La Música (lit. 'Thanks for the Music') is a Spanish-language compilation album by Swedish pop group ABBA, released in Spain on 5 April 1980 and Latin America on May 10.

The album was originally released due to the unexpected surge in popularity for the group in Latin American countries such as Mexico and Argentina after the release of the Spanish-language versions of "Chiquitita" and "I Have a Dream" in 1979. These tracks were both released as singles and went on to become hits. Encouraged by this success, the band therefore decided to record another eight tracks in Spanish and release a full-length album especially for the Latin American market.

The album was also released in ABBA's native Sweden on June 23, and in Japan on July 21 after ABBA played eleven successful concerts earlier in March.

== Background and production ==
In 1978, the couple Buddy and Mary McCluskey (working for CBS Records at the time), met Stig Anderson, ABBA's manager by chance at a convention in Miami, Florida. According to the McCluskeys, after ABBA performed "Chiquitita" at the Music for UNICEF Concert in January 1979, Buddy McCluskey called Anderson to encourage him to allow ABBA to record the song in Spanish. Anderson agreed and the McCluskeys wrote the Spanish lyrics in Pinamar, Argentina.

The following day, they flew to Stockholm to aid the recording of the song at Polar Studios. The song was released in Spanish-speaking countries to great success. In September 1979, the McCluskeys encouraged ABBA to record "I Have a Dream" in Spanish as "Estoy soñando"; the song was recorded on 30 August 1979 at Metronome Studio in Stockholm.

The success of the Spanish versions of "Chiquitita" and "Estoy soñando" in Latin America led to the decision to record further ABBA songs in Spanish in order to create a full-length Spanish language album. According to the McCluskeys, they selected the songs to be translated into Spanish and completed the translations during the latter half of 1979.

An interview the McCluskeys gave in 2010 suggests that Björn Ulvaeus advised the McCluskeys on at least one occasion as they struggled to translate the title words of "Thank You for the Music" into phrasing that would fit the song's melody, that the phrasing should be translated in order to "respect the music" rather than to retain the original phrasing entirely. The phrasing was thus translated to "quiero dar las gracias a las canciones" [I want to thank the songs]. The album's title is the literal Spanish translation of the song's title.

Recording sessions for the eight new Spanish tracks took place in January 1980 at Stockholm's Polar Music studios. Swedish/Spanish journalist Ana Martinez del Valle assisted lead vocalists Agnetha Fältskog and Anni-Frid Lyngstad with pronunciation. The McCluskeys also provided phonetic lyric sheets.

As Benny Andersson and Ulvaeus were in Barbados writing songs for the upcoming album Super Trouper, production responsibilities were left to the group's sound engineer Michael B. Tretow, who recorded the new Spanish vocal overdubs onto existing backing tracks at his home studio (named "Mike's Studio" in the album liner notes).

The absence of Andersson and Ulvaeus is most apparent on "Al andar" (the Spanish version of "Move On") where the original opening speech from Ulvaeus was replaced by a more conventional opening verse sung by Fältskog. Meanwhile, some of Tretow's new Spanish mixes were significantly different from their English counterparts, reflecting his own personal preferences regarding the handling of drum sounds and the significant time gap between the English and Spanish versions.

Some tracks were revisited up to six years after their original completion. According to ABBA historian Carl Magnus Palm, the recording of "Dancing Queen" (as "Reina danzante") is the most different sounding to the original version due to new piano overdubbing probably recorded by Andersson on return from Barbados at Polar Music Studio in Stockholm. Andersson, however, claims to have listened to Gracias Por La Música only once, to approve the album once it was completed.

== Release ==
In April 1980, Stig Anderson travelled to Argentina to present the record to Latin American record labels. The album was released in Argentina and Spain in May, and later in the U.S. It was released on 23 June 1980 in Sweden on the Septima label, before being released in the UK by Epic, then in Japan.

Gracias Por La Música saw numerous CD issues in the 1980s including releases in Japan in 1986 (on Polydor), Spain in 1989 (on RCA), and a rare CBS Records issue of an unknown date. The album was deleted in most territories after the compilation CD ABBA Oro: Grandes Exitos, which contained the ten tracks of Gracias Por La Música, was released in 1992, rendering this album obsolete. However, the original version of the album continued to be available in Japan and Argentina until the late 1990s.

=== Deluxe edition ===
On November 10, 2014, the deluxe edition of Gracias Por La Música was released as part of ABBA's 40th anniversary celebrations. This set consisted of a CD of the original album with five bonus Spanish tracks and a 40-minute DVD of unreleased TV performances and vintage videos.

Included in this DVD compilation were: two performances of "Chiquitita" on TVE's 300 Millones and Aplauso; promo clips of "Estoy soñando", "Felicidad", and "No hay a quien culpar"; the TVE Especial Aplauso 100, that showcases ABBA on Spanish TV and features an interview, a performance of "¡Dame! ¡Dame! ¡Dame!", and promo clips of "Conociéndome, conociéndote" and "Gracias por la música"; and the "International Sleeve Gallery".

The package also contained a 20-page illustrated booklet with an essay on the making of the album; insights from the McCluskeys (in charge of writing the Spanish lyrics) and Ana Martinez del Valle (Agnetha's and Frida's Spanish vocal coach); and a personal greeting from Frida, available both in Spanish and English.

Four of the bonus tracks included on this edition were recorded in October 1980 ("Andante, Andante", "Felicidad"), for inclusion on the Spanish and Latin American versions of Super Trouper and in November 1981 ("No hay a quien culpar", "Se me está escapando"), for inclusion on the Spanish and Latin American versions of The Visitors. The Spanish version of the song "Ring Ring" had been recorded in July 1973, with Spanish lyrics by Doris Band; this recording was however first released in 1994 for the Spanish compilation album Más Oro: Más ABBA Exitos.

== Critical reception ==
Professional ratings
Review scores
Source	Rating
Allmusic	2/5 stars
The Encyclopedia of Popular Music	2/5 stars

The Yorkshire Evening Post described the performances on the deluxe version of the album as "uniformly immaculate". Classic Pop magazine described the album as "less of a throwaway and more of a collectable remix album."

Gracias Por La Música was certified Platinum in Spain, and stayed on the Spanish Album charts for twenty-one weeks.

== Track listing ==
All tracks are written by Benny Andersson, Björn Ulvaeus, and Stig Anderson, with Spanish lyrics by Buddy and Mary McCluskey; except where noted.

Side one
No.	Title	Writer(s)	Spanish version of	Length
1.	"Gracias por la música"	Andersson; Ulvaeus; B. McCluskey; M. McCluskey	"Thank You for the Music"	3:52
2.	"Reina danzante"		"Dancing Queen"	4:05
3.	"Al andar"		"Move On"	4:44
4.	"¡Dame! ¡Dame! ¡Dame!"	Andersson; Ulvaeus; B. McCluskey; M. McCluskey	"Gimme! Gimme! Gimme! (A Man After Midnight)"	4:52
5.	"Fernando"		"Fernando"	4:18

Side two
No.	Title	Writer(s)	Spanish version of	Length
1.	"Estoy soñando"	Andersson; Ulvaeus; B. McCluskey; M. McCluskey	"I Have a Dream"	4:44
2.	"Mamma mía"		"Mamma Mia"	3:32
3.	"Hasta mañana"		"Hasta Mañana"	3:11
4.	"Conociéndome, conociéndote"		"Knowing Me, Knowing You"	4:02
5.	"Chiquitita"	Andersson; Ulvaeus; B. McCluskey; M. McCluskey	"Chiquitita"	5:36
Total length:				43:00

The Spanish version of "Dancing Queen" was originally titled "Reina danzante", but was retitled "La reina del baile" for the 1993 ABBA Oro CD release.

=== Deluxe edition ===
Released on November 10, 2014. All tracks are written by Benny Andersson and Björn Ulvaeus, with Spanish lyrics by Buddy and Mary McCluskey; except where noted.

Bonus tracks
No.	Title	Writer(s)	Spanish version of	Length
11.	"Ring ring"	Andersson; Stig Anderson; Ulvaeus; Doris Band	"Ring Ring"	3:00
12.	"Andante, andante"		"Andante, Andante"	4:39
13.	"Felicidad"		"Happy New Year"	4:24
14.	"No hay a quien culpar"		"When All Is Said and Done"	3:13
15.	"Se me está escapando"		"Slipping Through My Fingers"	3:52

== Personnel ==
- Benny Andersson, Björn Ulvaeus – composers, arrangers, producers
- Michael B. Tretow – engineer
- Rune Söderqvis, Lars Liljendahl – album design
- Heinz Angemayr – photography
- Buddy and Mary McCluskey – Spanish lyrics, pronunciation
- Ana Martinez del Valle – pronunciation

== Charts ==
Chart (1980)	Peak position
Argentinian Albums (CAPIF)	2
Finnish Albums (Suomen virallinen lista)	28
Japanese Albums	26
Spanish Albums (AFE)	2
US Hot Latin LPs (Billboard)	9

2014 deluxe edition
Chart (2014)	Peak position
Belgian Albums (Ultratop Flanders)	106
Spanish Albums (PROMUSICAE)	47

== Certifications and sales ==
Region	Certification	Certified units/sales
Argentina	—	240,000
Spain (PROMUSICAE)	Platinum	100,000^{^}
^{^} Shipments figures based on certification alone.
