= On and On and On =

1980 song by ABBA

- Australian picture sleeve

Single by ABBA

from the album Super Trouper
- A-side: "Lay All Your Love on Me"
- B-side: "The Piper"; "Our Last Summer"; "Lay All Your Love on Me"
- Written: January 1980
- Released: 10 November 1980
- Recorded: 9 April 1980
- Genre: Disco-rock; European electro
- Length: 3:40
- Label: Polar
- Songwriters: Benny Andersson; Björn Ulvaeus
- Producers: Benny Andersson; Björn Ulvaeus

ABBA singles chronology
"Super Trouper" (1980)	"On and On and On" (1980)	"Happy New Year" (1980)

Music video
- "On and On and On" on YouTube

"On and On and On" is a song by the Swedish recording group ABBA, recorded for their seventh studio album Super Trouper (1980). Agnetha Fältskog and Anni-Frid Lyngstad share lead vocals on the track, which was written and produced by Benny Andersson and Björn Ulvaeus. The disco-rock song was released on 10 November 1980 as the third single from Super Trouper in limited countries. It was included in More ABBA Gold: More ABBA Hits (1993).

== Background ==
The track had the working titles "Esses vad det svänger när man spelar jazz" (roughly translated as "God Almighty How it Swings When You're Playing Jazz") and "'Til the Night is Gone", which is a line included in the chorus. Ulvaeus and Andersson headed to Barbados in January 1980 for writing inspiration, in the same vein as when the two visited Miami during the Voulez-Vous (1979) sessions. "On and On and On", along with "Happy New Year", were the first two songs written for Super Trouper.

== Recording ==
The backing track for "On and On and On" was recorded on 12 February 1980, with Fältskog and Lyngstad's vocals being taken on 9 April 1980. Sax overdubs were added on 17 April, while the track was mixed on 23–24 April.

An extended mix of the song was used in the accompanying music video but not released on a record until The Complete Studio Recordings (2005). The fifth verse of the song was:

"Standing up is scary if you think you're gonna fall /
Like a Humpty Dumpty, 'fraid of falling off the wall /
I say if you ever wanna know what's going on /
Gotta keep on rocking, baby, 'til the night is gone"

== Composition ==
"On and On and On" is written in the key of C major, with Fältskog and Lyngstad's vocals ranging from Bb3–B4.

== Critical reception ==
Record World said it was a "tasty, harmless, pop confection" and suggested that listeners "bounce, clap and smile along to [ABBA's] latest morsel." British magazine Classic Pop named it ABBA's 11th top track, describing it as one of the group's more rockier songs and noting "the Beach Boys-esque falsetto backing vocals" from Andersson. The Independent ranked it at number ten on their list of ABBA's underrated songs, writing of how its chorus "would have certainly felt repetitive in lesser hands" but that "ABBA managed to turn the refrain into an earworm for the ages."

== Chart reception ==
"On and On and On" reached a peak position of number nine in Australia, the second top ten hit from Super Trouper following "The Winner Takes It All" and ABBA's 15th and, as of 2025, last top ten hit in the country; it was also the group's final top forty hit for over forty years until "I Still Have Faith in You" and "Don't Shut Me Down" peaked at numbers 39 and 27 in 2021. In the United States, it became ABBA's worst charting single on the Billboard Hot 100, peaking at a dismal number 90. It did not enter the Cash Box Top 100 but did peak at number 125 on Record World's singles chart. However, it did top the US Dance Club Songs chart in May 1981 as a 12-inch single alongside "Super Trouper" and "Lay All Your Love on Me".

== Music video ==
The "music video" for "On and On and On" was the first by ABBA to not feature any live movement. Instead, a photo montage was made from their Las Vegas concert during the US leg of ABBA: The Tour in 1979, which attempted to match the action of the photos with the song.

== Covers ==
Beach Boys member Mike Love recorded a cover of "On and On and On" for his 1981 debut solo album Looking Back with Love.

== Personnel ==
ABBA

- Agnetha Fältskog – lead and backing vocals
- Anni-Frid Lyngstad – lead and backing vocals
- Björn Ulvaeus – backing vocals
- Benny Andersson – backing vocals, piano, synthesizers

Additional personnel and production staff

- Janne Schaffer – guitar
- Rutger Gunnarsson – bass
- Ola Brunkert – drums
- Lars O. Carlsson, Katjek Wojciechowski, Jan Kling – saxophones

== Track listings and formats ==
"On and On and On" was also supposedly released in France but no information links of this release.

Australian and Japanese 7-inch single

1. "On and On and On" – 3:41
2. "The Piper" – 4:40

Argentine and Canadian 7-inch single

1. "On and On and On" – 3:41
2. "Our Last Summer"– 4:18

American 7-inch single

1. "On and On and On" – 3:41
2. "Lay All Your Love on Me" – 4:31

== Charts ==
=== Weekly charts ===
Weekly chart performance for "On and On and On"
Chart (1980–1981)	Peak position
Australia (Kent Music Report)	9
France (SNEP)	7
Japan (Oricon)	24
US Billboard Hot 100	90
US Dance Club Songs (Billboard)	1
US Record World Singles	125

=== Year-end charts ===
Year-end chart performance for "On and On and On"
Chart (1981)	Position
Australia (Kent Music Report)	84

== Release history ==
Release dates and formats for "On and On and On"
Region	Date	Label(s)	Ref.
Australia	10 November 1980	RCA Victor	
Japan	5 December 1980	Discomate	
United States	15 June 1981	Atlantic	
