= Me and I =

Song by ABBA

from the album Super Trouper
- Released: 1980
- Recorded: 1980
- Genre: Synth-pop
- Length: 4:54
- Songwriters: Benny Andersson, Björn Ulvaeus
- Producers: Benny Andersson, Björn Ulvaeus

Audio video
- "Me and I" on YouTube

"Me and I" is a song from ABBA's 1980 album Super Trouper. As with much of ABBA's 1980s output, the song features use of a synthesizer, and some have classified the song as synthpop. Anni-Frid Lyngstad sang the lead vocals.

== Background ==
Recording began on 8 September 1980 and finished on 25 September 1980. The track acquired the following two working titles: "Jackass" and "Piccolino". It is the last song on the first side of Super Trouper.

In his book Bright Lights, Dark Shadows, Carl Magnus Palm wrote the following:

"Bjorn's maturity as a lyricist was showcased in songs like 'The Winner Takes It All', and the hidden gem, 'Me and I', featuring an Eartha Kitt-inspired lead vocal by Frida, showed a hitherto secluded side of Björn's imagination. Its split personality theme - I am to myself what Jekyll must have been to Hyde - combined with Frida's forceful delivery put a welcome darker spin on ABBA's largely bright and wholesome universe. It was a more literal version of broodiness that coloured songs like 'SOS' and 'Knowing Me, Knowing You'."

In the early 1980s, the instrumental section of the song was used as theme music to BBC television coverage of bowls.

== Critical reception ==
Abba - Uncensored on the Record described it as a "comparatively rarely heard song from the Super Trouper album". Bright Lights Dark Shadows: The Real Story of Abba described it as "the hidden gem" of the Super Trouper album.

== Performances ==
The song has been performed once, on the ABBA TV special, Dick Cavett Meets ABBA in 1981. The live rendition is included on the Thank You for the Music box set released in 1994.
