= The Piper (song) =

Song by ABBA

from the album Super Trouper
- A-side: "Super Trouper"
- Released: November 3, 1980
- Recorded: April 1980
- Studio: Polar Studios, Stockholm
- Genre: Synth-pop; calypso
- Length: 3:25
- Label: Polar; Epic; Atlantic
- Songwriters: Benny Andersson; Björn Ulvaeus
- Producers: Benny Andersson; Björn Ulvaeus

Audio video
- "The Piper" on YouTube

"The Piper" is a track from the 1980 album Super Trouper, by Swedish pop group ABBA. The song is loosely based on the famous story of The Pied Piper of Hamelin, but lyricist Björn Ulvaeus cites the novel The Stand by Stephen King as a source of inspiration. It is regarded by some ABBA fans as being very different from the more mainstream songs they had recorded until this time. In particular, the dark lyrics dealing with the seduction by fascistic leaders and a somewhat medieval sound (drums, flute, choral) are not seen in their earlier songs.

ABBA: Uncensored on the Road explains that the song was also the flip-side of the single "Super Trouper"; while From ABBA to Mamma Mia!: The Official Book adds: "After a two-week break in March for the concluding tour of Japan, by the end of April ABBA had completed the songs "Andante, Andante", "On And On And On", "Happy New Year", "Elaine" and "The Piper"."
