= More ABBA Gold: More ABBA Hits =

Greatest hits album by ABBA
- Released: 24 May 1993
- Recorded: 1973–1982
- Genre: Pop
- Length: 76:26 (1993); 78:14 (1999–present)
- Label: PolyGram
- Producers: Benny Andersson; Björn Ulvaeus

ABBA chronology
ABBA Gold (1992)	More ABBA Gold: More ABBA Hits (1993)	Oro: Grandes Éxitos (1993)

Professional ratings
Review scores
Source	Rating
AllMusic	3/5 stars
The Encyclopedia of Popular Music	3/5 stars
Music Week	3/5 stars
Select	2/5 medals

More ABBA Gold: More ABBA Hits is a compilation album by Swedish pop group ABBA. Released on 24 May 1993, it served as the sequel to the hugely successful ABBA Gold (1992). It went on to sell three million copies worldwide.

== Overview ==
While Gold: Greatest Hits had showcased 19 of the group's biggest and most recognizable hits, it left out a number of other sizeable ones. Therefore, More ABBA Gold was issued as a 20 tracks companion collection, that included some of these other hits, such as "Summer Night City", "I Do, I Do, I Do, I Do, I Do", "Angeleyes", and "Ring Ring", as well as some of ABBA's lesser-known ones from the time when their popularity was declining, such as "Head Over Heels" and "The Day Before You Came". Also included were several B-sides, like "Lovelight" (the B-side of "Chiquitita") and "Cassandra" (B-side of "The Day Before You Came"), along with other album tracks like "The Visitors" and "I Wonder (Departure)".

A previously unreleased track, "I Am the City", was featured in this compilation. It dates back to ABBA's then-final recording sessions in 1982.

== Release ==
More ABBA Gold: More ABBA Hits was released on 24 May 1993, as a companion to ABBA Gold: Greatest Hits, previously released in September 1992. Like ABBA Gold, a remaster of More ABBA Gold was released in 1999. The 4:27 promo edit of "The Visitors" was replaced by the original 5:46 version, while the 3:18 alternate mix of "Lovelight" was replaced by the 3:46 version originally released in 1979, as the B-side of "Chiquitita".

The original VHS edition only features 9 video tracks from the original vinyl track listing with four extra videos—"Bang a Boomerang", "One Man, One Woman", "That's Me" and "Happy New Year." It was also released in Europe in 1994 on the Video CD format, an unofficial Brazilian DVD edition in 2002 (all in Portuguese with extra features i.e. Discography and Biography), and in the North American market on the LaserDisc format.

In 2008, the album was re-released with a different disc and back cover to coincide with the release of the film Mamma Mia!. It was reissued in a so-called super jewel case, with updated liner notes and remastered sound.

== Track listing ==
All tracks are written by Benny Andersson and Björn Ulvaeus, except where noted.

1993 release track list
No.	Title	Writer(s)	Original album	Length
1.	"Summer Night City"		Non-album single (1978)	3:28
2.	"Angeleyes"		Voulez-Vous (1979)	4:16
3.	"The Day Before You Came"		The Singles: The First Ten Years (1982)	5:47
4.	"Eagle" (single version)		ABBA: The Album (1977)	4:23
5.	"I Do, I Do, I Do, I Do, I Do"	Andersson; Stig Anderson; Ulvaeus	ABBA (1975)	3:16
6.	"So Long"		ABBA	3:06
7.	"Honey, Honey"	Andersson; Anderson; Ulvaeus	Waterloo (1974)	2:53
8.	"The Visitors" (US promo edit)		The Visitors (1981)	4:27
9.	"Our Last Summer"		Super Trouper (1980)	4:19
10.	"On and On and On"		Super Trouper	3:38
11.	"Ring Ring"	Andersson; Anderson; Ulvaeus; Neil Sedaka; Phil Cody	Ring Ring (1973)	3:00
12.	"I Wonder (Departure)"	Andersson; Anderson; Ulvaeus	ABBA: The Album	4:34
13.	"Lovelight" (alternate mix)		B-side of "Chiquitita" (1979)	3:18
14.	"Head Over Heels"		The Visitors	3:45
15.	"When I Kissed the Teacher"		Arrival (1976)	3:00
16.	"I Am the City"		Previously unreleased	4:00
17.	"Cassandra"		B-side of "The Day Before You Came" (1982)	4:50
18.	"Under Attack"		The Singles: The First Ten Years	3:44
19.	"When All Is Said and Done"		The Visitors	3:16
20.	"The Way Old Friends Do" (recorded live in 1979 at Wembley Arena)		Super Trouper	2:52
Total length:				1:16:26

=== Notes ===
- On the 1999 Australasian reissue, "I Do, I Do, I Do, I Do, I Do", "Ring Ring", "Lovelight", and "Cassandra" were removed and replaced with "Super Trouper", "I Have a Dream", and "Thank You for the Music". On the original release of ABBA Gold, these three tracks were removed from the Australasian release and replaced with "I Do, I Do, I Do, I Do, I Do", "Ring Ring", and "Rock Me" as these were more local successes; "I Do, I Do, I Do, I Do, I Do", "Ring Ring", and "Rock Me" peaked at numbers one, seven, and four on the Kent Music Report chart, which contrasted with the No. 77, No. 64, and No. 82 peaks of "Super Trouper", "I Have a Dream", and "Thank You for the Music".

== Personnel ==
ABBA

- Agnetha Fältskog – lead vocals (3, 14, 15, 18), co-lead vocals (1, 2, 4, 5, 6, 7, 10, 11, 13, 16, 20), backing vocals
- Anni-Frid Lyngstad – lead vocals (8, 9, 12, 17, 19), co-lead vocals (1, 2, 4, 5, 6, 7, 10, 11, 13, 16, 20), backing vocals
- Björn Ulvaeus – co-lead vocals (1), banjo, guitar, vocals, production
- Benny Andersson – synthesizer, keyboards, vocals, production

Production

- Björn Ulvaeus, Benny Andersson – producers
- Chris Griffin – compilation
- Jackie Stansfield – compilation
- George McManus – compilation
- John Tobler – liner notes, compilation
- Dick Wallis – compilation
- Ingemar Bergman – compilation
- Icon – design
- Fredrik Hurtil – 2008 redesign
- Mia Segolsson – project coordination (2008 reissue)
- Wolfgang "Bubi" Heilemann – photography (2008 reissue)
- Polar Music International AB – photography (2008 reissue)
- Michael B. Tretow – digital remastering (for original 1993 release), engineer
- Jon Astley – digital remastering (for 1999 reissue)
- Henrik Jonsson – digital remastering (for 2008 reissue)
- Carl Magnus Palm – liner notes (for 1999 version)

== Charts ==
=== Weekly charts ===
1993 weekly chart performance for More ABBA Gold: More ABBA Hits
Chart (1993)	Peak position
Australian Albums (ARIA)	60
Austrian Albums (Ö3 Austria)	7
European Albums (Music & Media)	7
Hungarian Albums (MAHASZ)	16
Dutch Albums (Album Top 100)	10
Norwegian Albums (VG-lista)	7
Swiss Albums (Schweizer Hitparade)	13
German Albums (Offizielle Top 100)	9
UK Albums (Official Charts)	14

1999 weekly chart performance for More ABBA Gold: More ABBA Hits
Chart (1999)	Peak position
Australian Albums (ARIA)	80
European Albums (Music & Media)	57
Swedish Albums (Sverigetopplistan)	3
UK Albums (Official Charts)	13

2008 weekly chart performance for More ABBA Gold: More ABBA Hits
Chart (2008)	Peak position
Australian Albums (ARIA)	38
Belgian Albums (Ultratop Flanders)	78
Belgian Albums (Ultratop Wallonia)	60
French Compilations (SNEP)	35
Irish Albums (IRMA)	44
UK Albums (Official Charts)	63

2010 weekly chart performance for More ABBA Gold: More ABBA Hits
Chart (2010)	Peak position
Finnish Albums (Suomen virallinen lista)	33

=== Year-end charts ===
1993 year-end chart performance for More ABBA Gold: More ABBA Hits
Chart (1993)	Position
Dutch Albums (MegaCharts)	44
European Albums (Music & Media)	66
German Albums (Offizielle Top 100)	69

== Certifications and sales ==
Region	Certification	Certified units/sales
Austria (IFPI Austria)	Gold	25,000^{*}
Canada (Music Canada)	Gold	50,000^{^}
France (SNEP)	Gold	100,000^{*}
Germany (BVMI)	Gold	250,000^{^}
Germany (BVMI) video	Gold	25,000^{^}
Singapore	—	19,000
Sweden (GLF)	Platinum	100,000^{^}
Switzerland (IFPI Switzerland)	Platinum	50,000^{^}
United Kingdom (BPI)	Platinum	300,000^{^}
Summaries
Europe	—	1,000,000
Worldwide	—	3,000,000
^{*} Sales figures based on certification alone.^{^} Shipments figures based on certification alone.
