= Super Trouper (spotlight) =

Trademark of spotlights

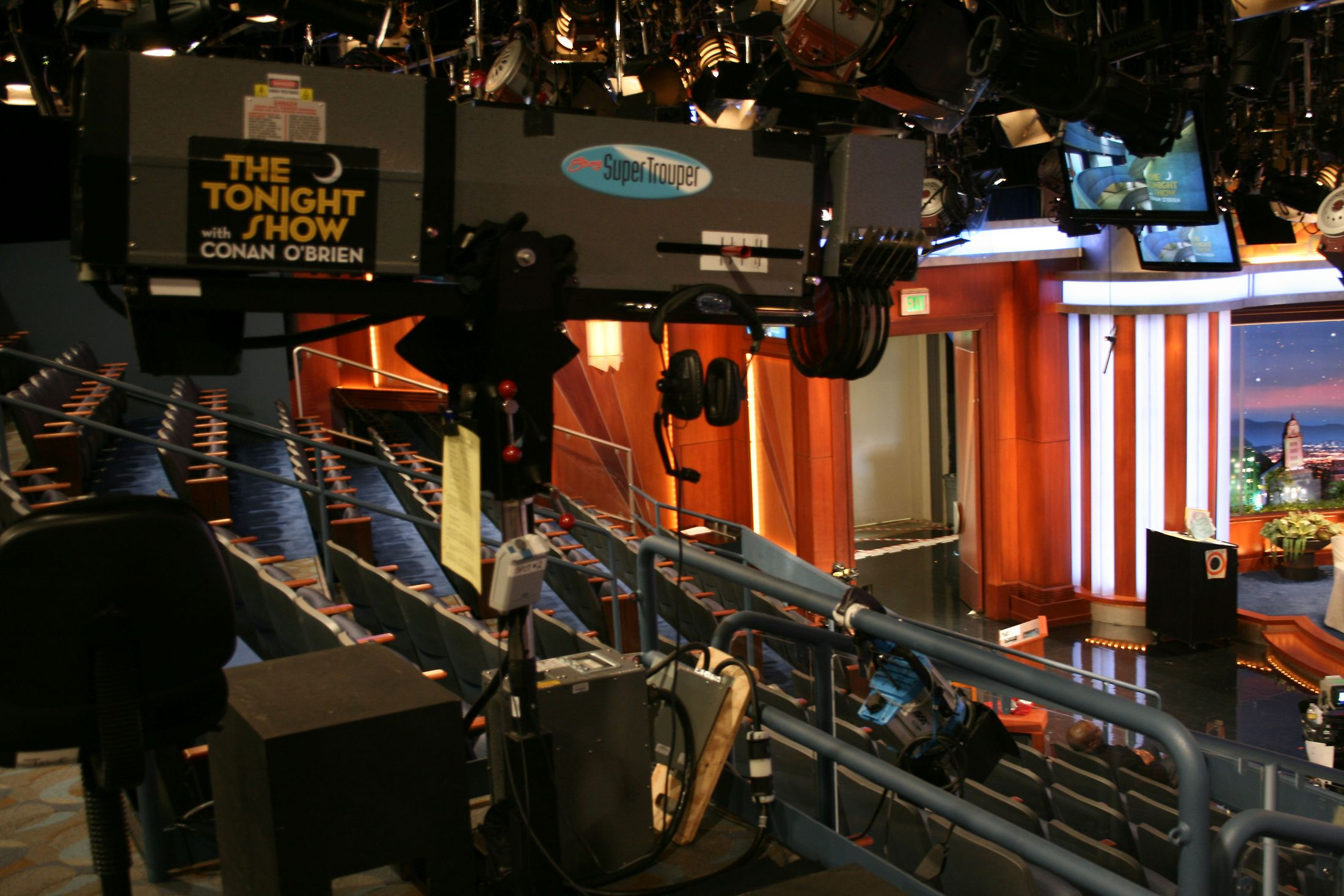

Fixture details
- Fixture type(s): Spotlight
- Purpose(s): Followspot
- Rigging method(s): Spotlight Yoke
- Model(s): Long Throw, Short Throw, Medium Throw, Super Trouper II, Super Trouper III
- Lamp type(s): Carbon Arc (until 1965), Xenon
- Colors(s): Black, White, Gray
- Accessories: Boomerang Color Changer
- Automated: No

Production
- First sold: 1956
- Manufacturer(s): Strong Lighting
- Currently produced: Yes
- Website: https://strong.lighting/portfolio/super-trouper/

Super Trouper is a registered trademark for a series of follow spotlights used in stadium, concert, and special-event lighting. The lights are manufactured by Strong Lighting of Omaha, Nebraska, which acquired the Super Trouper and its larger cousin, the Gladiator, from its former manufacturer Syncrolite who had acquired them from Ballantyne Strong of Omaha, Nebraska (originally Strong Electric Corporation of Toledo, Ohio), in November 2016.

== History ==
The lights were first manufactured in 1956. Initially, the Super Trouper utilized a high-intensity carbon arc lamp. In the 1980s, as carbon arc lamps fell into decreasing use, the spotlight began to employ a high-intensity xenon lamp as its light source.

With very few exceptions, Strong has maintained a consistent design on Super Trouper models since the first xenon-type models were introduced in the late 1970s. Initially the reflector unit was composed of electroformed nickel with a rhodium plating. Today, Super Trouper follow spots are manufactured using a similarly designed nickel reflector, though a dichroic coating has supplanted the rhodium coating.

The xenon-type Super Troupers had utilized a larger "AC" igniter assembly, which had been specially designed to function with the original high-reactance power supplies. As suggested by the name however, Super Troupers were intended for portability and "trouping" and the bulky two hundred pounds (91 kg) plus power supplies were not conducive to travel environments.

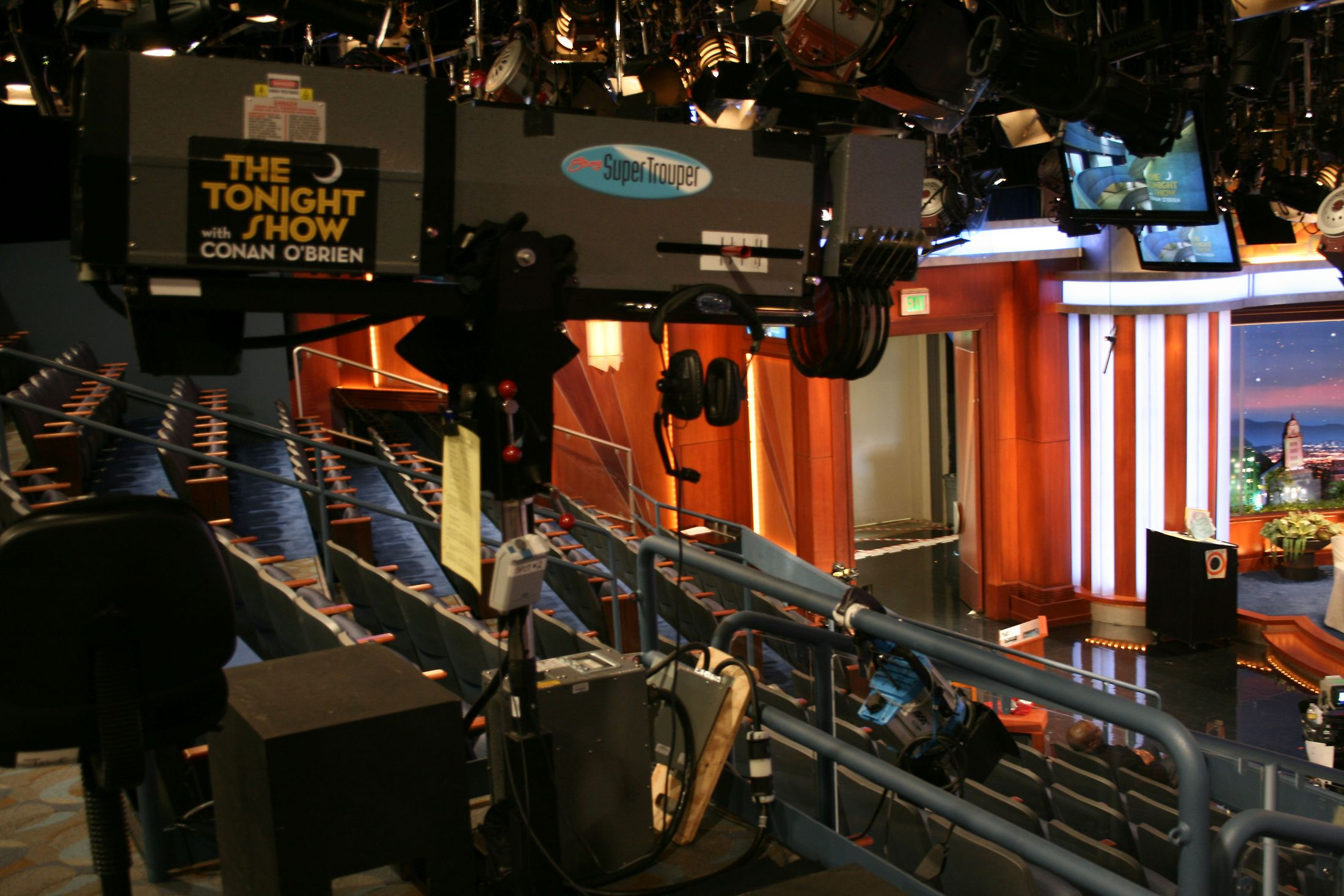
Super Trouper ST/MT spotlight

Strong introduced their first version of the solid-state switching 1 kW-3 kW power supply for their xenon follow spots in 1988, without having to engineer any modifications to the Super Trouper's operational design. This new solid-state power supply unit weighed in at approximately sixty-five pounds (29 kg), which was roughly one third the weight of its high-reactance predecessor.

Strong introduced the Super Trouper II model xenon follow spot in 1995 as the first new follow spot design since the xenon Gladiator III in 1983. With it, Strong also released a new "DC" ignitor assembly, which was a simpler and more reliable version of its predecessor: the "AC" ignitor. It allowed for a shorter ignition time and required less space than the standard AC ignitors found in standard Super Trouper followspots.

Then, in 1997, with the introduction of Strong's new, compact 1 kW-3 kW switching power supply it became clear that the existing AC ignitor assemblies in the original Super Trouper (and not Super Trouper II's) were not functionally compatible with the new power supplies. Over the next several years, DC ignitor assemblies began to gradually replace the older AC ignitors.

The Super Trouper line of xenon follow spots is inclusive of four production models: Super Trouper Long Throw, Super Trouper Short Throw, Super Trouper Medium Throw, and Super Trouper II. Each model is available in either a 1600 watt or a 2000 watt variety.

As of early 2023, Strong Lighting continues to manufacture limited quantities of the Super Trouper for special orders at their facility in La Vista, Nebraska.

== In popular culture ==
The Super Trouper is also the subject of the 1980 ABBA song of the same name, and in turn the title of the group's seventh studio album Super Trouper. The cover of the album, designed by Rune Söderqvist, depicts the group standing under a spotlight.

"Super Trouper" is also the title of a rock song by Deep Purple (on their 1973 album Who Do We Think We Are). It describes how the Super Trouper makes the performer on stage shine while blinding him (literally and figuratively).

== See also ==
- Spotlight operator
