= Super Trouper (song) =

1980 song by ABBA

Single by ABBA

from the album Super Trouper
- B-side: "The Piper"
- Released: 3 November 1980
- Recorded: 1980
- Genre: Pop; disco
- Length: 4:10
- Label: Polar; Epic (UK)
- Songwriters: Benny Andersson; Björn Ulvaeus
- Producers: Benny Andersson; Björn Ulvaeus

ABBA singles chronology
"The Winner Takes It All" (1980)	"Super Trouper" (1980)	"On and On and On" (1980)

Music video
- "Super Trouper" on YouTube

"Super Trouper" is a song by the Swedish pop group ABBA, recorded for their seventh studio album of the same name, Super Trouper (1980). It was the last song recorded for the album, and was written and produced by Benny Andersson and Björn Ulvaeus. Anni-Frid Lyngstad sang lead vocals. It was released on 3 November 1980 as the second single from the record via Polar Music. The song's name refers to the Super Trouper, a type of spotlight used in large venues.

"Super Trouper" would go on to become one of the group's best selling singles, and a smash hit across Europe. In the United Kingdom, it was ABBA's ninth and final number one hit on the UK singles chart, and was the fourth best-selling single in the UK that year, selling over 700,000 copies. The single also reached the top spot in Belgium, Ireland, the Netherlands, Norway, Spain, and West Germany. It proved less successful, however, in Australia and North America, only reaching the top forty in Canada.

Lasse Hallström directed the music video, which features the group in the middle of a circus troupe and performing in a room with lights. It is featured on ABBA Gold (1992), and is also included in both the Mamma Mia! musical and Mamma Mia! film.

== Background ==
The song – with lead vocals by Anni-Frid Lyngstad – had the working title "Blinka Lilla Stjärna" (i.e. Twinkle Little Star, in Swedish), and was the last track to be written and recorded for the album (ultimately replacing the track "Put on Your White Sombrero").

The group had already decided on the album title Super Trouper when they realised that they needed another track for the album. Written in October 1980, the song fitted to become the title track and also a single.

== Lyrics ==
The first verse contains the line, "I was sick and tired of everything when I called you last night from Glasgow", with the video showing lead vocalist Anni-Frid Lyngstad singing this line. In February 2020, saxophonist Ulf Andersson, who toured with ABBA in the late 1970s, revealed that name-checking Glasgow was a coded love note from Björn Ulvaeus to then-wife Agnetha Faltskog. "It was a personal thing between Bjorn and Agnetha," he told the Scottish Mail on Sunday. "Björn was in Glasgow for some ABBA promotion. It was around the time they were about to separate. He wrote the lyrics and Agnetha sings it, but really it was meant to be from him."

However, in 2014 lyricist Björn Ulvaeus wrote about the creation of the song for The Singles box set, hinting it was inspired by his then-fiancé Lena Källersjö: "weaving a story around that title was no problem for a man, who had fallen in love again."

== Critical reception ==
Mark Cooper for Record Mirror disparagingly described "Super Trouper" as "pre-adolescent music for toy tin soldiers with white teeth to kiss to." Beverly Hillier, in Smash Hits's review for the album, named "Super Trouper" as one of the two best songs, but that it's "nothing in the league of some of their earlier classics." Record World said that the song "deals with onstage loneliness" and that "engaging vocal interaction bounces resoundingly."

== Commercial reception ==
"Super Trouper" continued ABBA's run of chart success, particularly in Europe.

=== United Kingdom ===
In the United Kingdom, "Super Trouper" debuted at number 13 on the UK singles chart the week of 15 November 1980, and reached the top spot two weeks later. It stayed at the number one spot for three consecutive weeks, becoming ABBA's ninth and final number one hit in the United Kingdom. This distinction placed ABBA fourth for the most UK chart-toppers in history (behind The Beatles, Elvis Presley and Cliff Richard); a position the group would keep for almost 20 years until Madonna scored her tenth UK No. 1 with "Music" in August 2000. "Super Trouper" was the overall fourth best selling single of 1980 in the United Kingdom, selling 709,000 copies alone. In addition to those physical sales, the single’s digital sales and streaming equivalent has achieved 600,000 units certified by the British Phonographic Industry (Platinum). Combined, total United Kingdom sales therefore exceed 1.3 million units.

=== Europe ===
Across Europe, "Super Trouper" became a major success. In Belgium, the song debuted at number 23 on the Ultratop 50 chart on 15 November 1980, and topped the chart four weeks later, becoming ABBA's seventh consecutive number one hit and overall thirteenth in the country. In the Netherlands, the track debuted at number 29 on the Single Top 100 chart on 22 November 1980, and reached the top spot the following week, making it their eighth number one single. In West Germany, "Super Trouper" spent five non-consecutive weeks atop the GfK singles chart, becoming their eighth number one single. The single also reached atop the Irish Singles Chart, Norwegian Singles Chart, Spanish Singles Chart, and the Europarade chart.

"Super Trouper" also achieved top ten status in Austria, Denmark, Finland, France (where it became the group's tenth and final top ten hit, peaking at number four on the French Singles Chart), and Switzerland. In the group's native Sweden however, the single failed to crack the top ten, stalling at number 11 on the Sverigetopplistan. It also charted in Italy at number 17.

=== North and South America ===
Outside of Europe, "Super Trouper" was a more modest hit. In the United States, the song debuted at number 88 on the Billboard Hot 100 the week of 4 April 1981. It failed to become a substantial hit, peaking at number 45. It performed even worse on sister charts from Cash Box and Record World, peaking at numbers 64 and 68. It did become a sizeable A/C hit, charting at number 14 on the Adult Contemporary chart. Its biggest success came on the dance chart, when it peaked atop the Billboard Dance Club Songs in May 1981, alongside "Lay All Your Love on Me" and "On and On and On". In Canada, "Super Trouper" proved slightly more successful, peaking at number 32 on the RPM Top 100 Singles chart. It proved most successful in Mexico, where it peaked at number three on the foreign-language chart. "Super Trouper" also charted at number 14 in Brazil.

=== Other territories ===
In Australia, "Super Trouper" was released as the third single in March 1981, uniquely issued with "Happy New Year" as its B-side. It was not a chart success, peaking at number 77 on the Kent Music Report. In Japan, the single peaked at number 93 on the Oricon Singles Chart, and was their last chart entry. In Israel, "Super Trouper" peaked at number two on charts provided by the Israel Broadcasting Authority.

== Music video ==
(From left-to-right) Björn Ulvaeus, Anni-Frid Lyngstad, and Agnetha Fältskog in the music video for "Super Trouper".

In October 1980, the music video for "Super Trouper" used the largest number of artists that ABBA ever used in a music video, including a full circus troupe. The spotlight featured throughout the video is, in fact, a CCT Silhouette profile spot with followspot kit, as opposed to a real Super Trouper. The city of Glasgow mentioned in the lyric was suggested by Howard Huntridge who worked with their then-UK publishers Bocu Music. The music video was directed by Lasse Hallström. Parts of the video for "Super Trouper" were later reused in the music video for "Happy New Year".

== Personnel ==
- Anni-Frid Lyngstad – lead vocals
- Agnetha Fältskog – vocals
- Benny Andersson – keyboards, synthesizer, backing vocals
- Björn Ulvaeus – acoustic guitar, backing vocals

=== Additional musicians ===
- Janne Schaffer – lead guitar
- Mike Watson – bass guitar
- Per Lindvall – drums
- Åke Sundqvist – percussion

== Track listings and formats ==
Standard 7-inch single

1. "Super Trouper" – 4:13
2. "The Piper" – 3:25

Australian 7-inch single

1. "Super Trouper" – 4:10
2. "Happy New Year" – 4:25

Chilean 7-inch single

1. "Super Trouper"
2. "Felicidad"

Japanese 7-inch single

1. "Super Trouper" – 4:12
2. "If It Wasn't for the Nights" – 5:10

Brazilian 7-inch single

1. "Super Trouper" – 4:13
2. "On and On and On" – 3:41

== Charts ==
=== Weekly charts ===
Weekly chart performance
Chart (1980–1981)	Peak position
Australia (Kent Music Report)	77
Austria (Ö3 Austria Top 40)	3
Belgium (Ultratop 50 Flanders)	1
Brazil – Sao Paulo (Nopem)	14
Canada Top Singles (RPM)	32
Denmark (IFPI)	2
European Singles (Europarade)	1
Finland (Seura)	6
Finland (Suomen virallinen lista)	8
France (French Singles Chart)	4
Ireland (IRMA)	1
Israel (IBA)	2
Italy (Billboard)	17
Netherlands (Dutch Top 40)	1
Netherlands (Single Top 100)	1
Norway (VG-lista)	1
Spain (AFYVE)	1
Sweden (Sverigetopplistan)	11
Switzerland (Schweizer Hitparade)	3
UK Singles (Official Charts)	1
US Billboard Hot 100	45
US Adult Contemporary (Billboard)	14
US Dance Club Songs (Billboard)	1
US Cash Box Top 100	64
US Pop/Adult Airplay (Radio & Records)	16
US Record World Singles	68
US A/C (Record World)	17
West Germany (GfK)	1

=== Year-end charts ===
Annual chart rankings
Chart (1980)	Position
Belgium (Ultratop 50 Flanders)	53
Netherlands (Dutch Top 40)	73
Netherlands (Single Top 100)	42
UK Singles (OCC)	4

Chart (1981)	Position
Austria (Ö3 Austria Top 40)	5
Belgium (Ultratop 50 Flanders)	62
West Germany (Media Control)	11

== Certifications and sales ==
Region	Certification	Certified units/sales
Denmark (IFPI Danmark)	Gold	45,000^{‡}
France	—	400,000
Germany (BVMI)	Gold	300,000^{‡}
New Zealand (RMNZ)	Platinum	30,000^{‡}
Russia (NFPF) Ringtone	Gold	100,000^{*}
Spain (Promusicae)	Gold	30,000^{‡}
United Kingdom (BPI)	Platinum	600,000^{‡}
^{*} Sales figures based on certification alone.^{‡} Sales+streaming figures based on certification alone.

- In the United Kingdom, total sales are estimated at over 1,300,000 copies, combining more than 700,000 physical copies sold in 1980 with a further 600,000 streaming-equivalent units certified by the British Phonographic Industry since 2004.

== A-Teens version ==
"Super Trouper"

Single by A-Teens

from the album The ABBA Generation
- Released: 2 August 1999
- Recorded: 1999
- Genre: Pop, Europop
- Length: 3:52
- Label: Universal Music Group
- Songwriters: Benny Andersson and Björn Ulvaeus
- Producers: Thomas Johansson; Ronald Malmberg

A-Teens singles chronology
"Mamma Mia" (1999)	"Super Trouper" (1999)	"Gimme! Gimme! Gimme! (A Man After Midnight)" (1999)

Music video
- "Super Trouper" on YouTube

"Super Trouper" was A-Teens' second single from their first album, The ABBA Generation (1999), a cover of ABBA's song. When the single came out in the fall of 1999, it became a hit around the globe, just as its predecessor "Mamma Mia", also an ABBA cover. "Super Trouper" debuted at No. 2 in Sweden and was later certified platinum.

It also became their only Top 5 hit in Germany peaking at No. 4. The single also reached No. 21 in the United Kingdom, No. 18 in Switzerland, No. 15 in Norway, No. 11 in Austria and No. 12 in the Netherlands.

=== Music video ===
The music video was directed by Sebastian Reed and was filmed in Sweden. The video shows a girl so obsessed with the band that she owns posters, magazines, mugs, clothing, and a key chain. She also copies the band's choreography that is shown on TV. Some of the articles that feature pictures of the band come to life in the video.

In the first few seconds of the video, before the actual song starts, Mamma Mia can be faintly heard in the background.

The video was a hit in most TV stations charting inside the Top 10 countdowns in late 1999 and early 2000.

=== Releases ===
- European 2-track CD single
1. "Super Trouper" (Radio Version) – 3:52
2. "Super Trouper" (Super Radio Remix) – 4:04
- European CD Maxi
1. "Super Trouper" (Radio Version) – 3:52
2. "Super Trouper" (Super Super Remix) – 8:58
3. "Super Trouper" (Pinocchio Remix) – 5:08
4. "Super Trouper" (Extended Version) – 6:05
- German CD Maxi (3 January 2000)
1. "Super Trouper" (Radio Version) – 3:52
2. "Super Trouper" (Perre J's Remix) – 4:04
3. "Happy New Year" – 4:23
4. "Mamma Mia" (Radio Version) – 3:43

- Video: "Mamma Mia"

- UK CD1 (22 November 1999)
1. "Super Trouper" (Radio Version) – 3:52
2. "A*Teens Medley" (Pierre J's Full UK Mix) – 7:27
3. "Super Trouper" (Karaoke Version) – 3:52

- Video: "Super Trouper"

- UK CD2 (22 November 1999)
1. "Super Trouper" (Extended Version) – 6:05
2. "Super Trouper" (W.I.P.) – 6:10
3. "Super Trouper" (The Bold & The Glamour Mix) – 6:50
- UK Cassette (22 November 1999)
1. "Super Trouper" (Radio Version) – 3:52
2. "Super Trouper" (Karaoke Version) – 3:52
- Japan CD Maxi (1 December 1999)
1. "Super Trouper" (Radio Version) – 3:52
2. "Happy New Year" – 4:23
3. "Super Trouper" (Super Super Remix) – 8:58
4. "Super Trouper" (Extended Version) – 6:05
- Sweden promo CD
1. "Super Trouper" (Radio Version) – 3:52
- 12" vinyl promo (1-track)
1. A. "Super Trouper" (Extended Version) – 6:05
- UK 12" vinyl promo (3-track) (22 November 1999)
1. A1. "Super Trouper" (Extended Version) – 6:05
2. B1. "Super Trouper" (The Bold & The Glamour Mix) – 6:50
3. B2. "Super Trouper" (W.I.P.) – 6:10

=== Charts ===
==== Weekly charts ====
Weekly chart performance for A*Teens cover
Chart (1999–2000)	Position
Austria (Ö3 Austria Top 40)	11
Belgium (Ultratop 50 Wallonia)	31
European Border Breakers (M&M)	15
Germany (GfK)	4
Netherlands (Dutch Top 40)	12
Netherlands (Single Top 100)	11
Norway (VG-lista)	15
Sweden (Sverigetopplistan)	2
Switzerland (Schweizer Hitparade)	18

==== Year-end charts ====
Annual chart rankings for A*Teens cover
Chart (1999)	Position
Netherlands (Dutch Top 40)	94
Netherlands (Single Top 100)	75
Sweden (Hitlistan)	23

Chart (2000)	Position
Germany (Media Control)	55

== Mamma Mia! Here We Go Again version ==
Super Trouper was released on 13 July 2018, alongside the soundtrack of Mamma Mia! Here We Go Again, by Capitol and Polydor Records. The song is performed by the whole main cast (Christine Baranski, Pierce Brosnan, Cher, Dominic Cooper, Alexa Davies, Josh Dylan, Colin Firth, Andy García, Jeremy Irvine, Lily James, Amanda Seyfried, Stellan Skarsgård, Hugh Skinner, Meryl Streep, Julie Walters and Jessica Keenan Wynn) and it was produced by Benny Andersson. The song was also performed in the first film by Streep, Baranski, and Walters.

=== Charts ===
Weekly chart performance for film version
Chart (2018)	Peak position
Scottish Singles Sales (Official Charts)	52
UK Singles Download Chart (OCC)	81
UK Singles Sales Chart (OCC)	81

=== Certifications ===
Certifications and sales for film version
Region	Certification	Certified units/sales
United Kingdom (BPI)	Silver	200,000^{‡}
^{‡} Sales+streaming figures based on certification alone.
