= Move On (ABBA song) =

Song by ABBA

from the album ABBA: The Album
- B-side: "Mamma Mia"
- Released: 12 December 1977 (album) 18 March 1979 (single)
- Studio: Polar Music Studios
- Genre: Waltz
- Length: 4:42
- Label: Polar
- Songwriters: Benny Andersson, Björn Ulvaeus, Stig Anderson
- Producers: Benny Andersson & Björn Ulvaeus

Audio video
- "Move On" on YouTube

"Move On" (working titles: "Golden Dreams and Golden Lies," "Yippee Yay," "Big John," "Joanne," and "Love for Me Is Love Forever") is a waltz song recorded by the Swedish music group ABBA for their 1977 release. ABBA: The Album. The lead vocals were performed by Björn Ulvaeus in the spoken first verse and by Agnetha Fältskog in the second and third verses.

The Spanish version of "Move On," "Al Andar" (or "El Andar"), was recorded in January 1980 for ABBA's Spanish language album Gracias Por La Música with Spanish lyrics by Buddy and Mary McCluskey.

"Al Andar" was also released with the Spanish version of "Hasta Mañana" as its B-side. [1]
