= Super Trouper (album) =

1980 studio album by ABBA

Studio album by ABBA
- Released: 3 November 1980
- Recorded: November 1979, 4 February – 15 October 1980
- Studios: Polar, Stockholm, Sweden
- Genres: Pop; pop rock
- Length: 42:06 (Swedish original release)
- Labels: Polar; Epic (UK); Atlantic (US original release)
- Producers: Benny Andersson; Björn Ulvaeus

ABBA chronology
Gracias Por La Música (1980)	Super Trouper (1980)	The Visitors (1981)

Singles from Super Trouper
- 1. "The Winner Takes It All" Released: 21 July 1980; 2. "Super Trouper" Released: 3 November 1980; 3. "On and On and On" Released: 10 November 1980; 4. "Happy New Year" Released: 15 December 1980; 5. "Andante, Andante" Released: February 1981; 6. "Lay All Your Love on Me" Released: 3 July 1981

Super Trouper is the seventh studio album by the Swedish pop group ABBA, released on 3 November 1980 via Polar Music. A pop and pop rock record, it was the last album to be recorded while members Anni-Frid Lyngstad and Benny Andersson were married, as the two would divorce in 1981. The album's title is taken from the spotlight of the same name.

Super Trouper received a positive reception from music critics, and has even been named by some as their best studio album. It was a hugely successful album, becoming the United Kingdom's best-selling album of 1980 despite the late release into the year. Reportedly, the album received one million advance orders in the country. Elsewhere, the album topped charts in Belgium, the Netherlands, Finland, Germany, Norway, and the group's native Sweden. The album has reportedly sold over eight million copies worldwide.

== Overview ==
Led by the international hit "The Winner Takes It All", Super Trouper was the group's sixth chart-topping album in the UK. It was also the best-selling album in Britain for 1980. Super Trouper was first released on CD in 1983 by Polar Music International, in the early 1980s by Polydor, and in the late 1980s by Atlantic Records for the US. The album has been reissued in digitally remastered form four times; first in 1997, then in 2001, again in 2005 as part of The Complete Studio Recordings box set and as a Deluxe Edition (containing a bonus DVD) in 2011.

The previous year's divorce between Björn and Agnetha was explored in "The Winner Takes It All", and the members' lives in Stockholm high society circles coloured the lyrics for "On and On and On". Other well-known songs on the album include the hit single title track "Super Trouper", as well as the electro-dance of "Lay All Your Love on Me".

Probably due to the disco backlash at that time, the album saw ABBA returning to a more straightforward pop sound, as opposed to the preceding (and noticeably more dance-oriented) Voulez-Vous album. The album closed with "The Way Old Friends Do", which was recorded live a year earlier during their 1979 concert tour. Although not released as a single with this album, the song was later released as a single in 1992 to promote the compilation More ABBA Gold: More ABBA Hits. The song was later covered by The Alexander Brothers, The Kingston Trio, Philomena Begley and Faryl Smith. On some European vinyl issues, the cheering and applause at the end of "The Way Old Friends Do" is recorded up to the run-out groove, playing in an endless loop on manual turntables.

== Writing and recording ==
In January 1980, Björn Ulvaeus and Benny Andersson went to Barbados to write songs for a new album, which resulted in five compositions. The first songs recorded for the album were "Andante, Andante", "Happy New Year" (originally intended as part of a never realised musical), and the backing track of the rockier "On and On and On". The sessions for the album was then interrupted by a short tour in Japan in March. Returning to the Polar Studios in Stockholm, the group then recorded and mixed the five tracks written, also including "The Piper" and "Elaine" (which would be released as a single b-side). Returning to the studio again in June with three new songs written to work on, including "The Winner Takes It All", which was released as the first single from the album in July would become a worldwide hit single, "Our Last Summer" and the country-flavoured "Burning My Bridges", which remains unreleased. After a summer holiday the group started the recording sessions again in September with yet another three new songs written, including "Me and I" and the electro-disco track "Lay All Your Love on Me". The third song in the September session was "Put On Your White Sombrero", which eventually was not included on the album. Having already decided that the album was going to be entitled Super Trouper, the group realised that they needed another track for the album to replace the ditched "Put On Your White Sombrero". Written in the studio as the last track for the album in October, the song fitted to become the title track and also a single.

Lyrically, many of the songs feature personal themes, most notably "The Winner Takes It All" which partly is about the break-up of Björn Ulvaeus and Agnetha Fältskog's marriage. "Our Last Summer" was based on a teenage romance Björn Ulvaeus had experienced in Paris in his youth. "The Piper" features an unusual lyric inspired by Stephen King's novel The Stand about the rise of a fascist-type leader. "Me and I" has another unusual lyric about conflicting sides in one's personality.

== Release ==
Super Trouper was released in November 1980. It was first issued on CD in 1983 by Polar Music International, in the early 1980s by Polydor, and in the late 1980s by Atlantic Records for the US. The album has been reissued in digitally remastered form four times; first in 1997, then in 2001, again in 2005 as part of The Complete Studio Recordings box set and as a Deluxe Edition (containing a bonus DVD) in 2011.

On 30 October 2020, Super Trouper was reissued for its 40th anniversary as a multi-format release. It included: a double-LP, half-speed mastered version of the album, done by Miles Showell at Abbey Road Studios on 12" black 180 gram, 45 rpm vinyl discs; a 7-inch singles box set of "Super Trouper", "Lay All Your Love on Me" and "The Winner Takes It All" pressed on colored vinyl; and individual 7" picture discs of these three singles.

=== Deluxe edition ===
On 9 May 2011, Super Trouper was reissued as a 2-disc deluxe edition package to celebrate as part of its 30th anniversary celebration. Disc one consisted of a remastered CD version of the original album, expanded with five bonus tracks. It featured the stereo mix of the original, full length version of "On And On And On", that was previously only found in mono, as well as "Put on Your White Sombrero", a song recorded during the album's sessions, not released until 1994 on the Thank You for the Music box set. The mastering of the tracks was done by Erik Broheden, using the original master tapes, at Masters of audio in Stockholm.

The second disc contained a variety of television content, including: ABBA's appearance on ZDF's Show Express, that included performances of "The Winner Takes It All", "Super Trouper", and "On And On And On"; a performance of "Happy New Year" from SVT; Words And Music, a documentary produced by Polar Music International that features the group talking about the album after its completion; the new featurette, Somewhere In The Crowd There's You – On Location With ABBA, that compiles footage from the night of the photo shoot for the album's sleeve; remastered promo clips of "Super Trouper" and "Happy New Year"; two Super Trouper TV commercials; and the "International Sleeve Gallery". This issue also had a 28-page booklet with an essay on the making of the album.

Paul Sinclair of SuperDeluxeEdition said that Super Trouper's deluxe edition "doesn't offer a great deal that fans will not already be familiar with" but that "for those wishing to explore beyond the boundaries of the enduring ABBA Gold collection... [it] could be a very good place to start".

== Album cover and title ==
Super Trouper is a registered trademark owned by Strong Entertainment Lighting for their brand of followspots, i.e., directional spotlights used to follow a performer on stage.

Album cover designer, Rune Söderqvist, decided to use the spotlight theme and photograph the group, surrounded by circus performers, at Piccadilly Circus, London, but after failing to gain permission to base the shoot in central London, they instead invited the members of two local circuses to Europa Film Studios, Stockholm to take the photograph there.

Several of ABBA's friends were also invited to take part and the following also appear on the cover: Görel Hanser (vice-president of Polar Music who subsequently married the band's photographer Anders Hanser), Berka Bergkvist (another Polar Music employee), Tomas Ledin, and Anders Anderson (ABBA's manager's son).

== Critical reception ==
Professional ratings
Review scores
Source	Rating
AllMusic	4/5 stars
Blender	4/5 stars
The Daily Vault	A−
The Encyclopedia of Popular Music	3/5 stars
Ondarock	6.5/10
Record Mirror	5/5 stars
rollingstone.de	4/5 stars
The Rolling Stone Album Guide	4/5 stars
Smash Hits	5/10

The album received favorable reviews from music critics.

In a contemporary review Record Mirror gave the album glowing praise in a five-star review, saying that they "put to shame most [other artists]". It gave credit to "the despair and pain of 'The Winner Takes it All' [and the] swelling optimism of the title track". They continue that "the secret of ABBA is never to hear them on an album where the highs become a level but each track needs to be savoured." Concluding "to give this album anything less than five stars would be a lie because this band never release anything less than perfection."

William Ruhlmann from AllMusic noted that "Super Trouper found ABBA, always trend-conscious, taking account of the passing of disco and returning to the pop/rock sound typical of their early albums" and that it includes "an unusual amount of what sounded like real unhappiness into their pop music".

Douglas Wolk from Blender gave the album four out of five stars and wrote that although it shows some "dark side" of the group like "being sick of show business", the Agnetha and Björn divorce, it has a "lot of joy" like the song "Lay All Your Love On Me".

Christopher Thelen, from The Daily Vault gave the album an A− and wrote that "whatever was happening to the band, internally or externally, they were able to take it and put the best creative spin on it. The result was possibly their best album".

American magazines Record World and Cash Box wrote favorable reviews, the former saying the group "continues to create stunning pop music with remarkable consistency," while the latter described the album as "another top quality collection of ballads and pop songs featuring the soaring female harmonies and A/C-oriented instrumentation that has carried it to a preeminent position in the international market."

British magazine Record Business noted "the group's never-failing melodic knack and unmistakable production touches shine through" the album.

The German counterpart of Rolling Stone magazine and The Rolling Stone Album Guide both gave four out of five stars, while Smash Hits magazine and The Encyclopedia of Popular Music gave the album mixed reviews.

== Track listing ==
All tracks are written by Benny Andersson and Björn Ulvaeus.

Side one
No.	Title	Length
1.	"Super Trouper"	4:13
2.	"The Winner Takes It All"	4:55
3.	"On and On and On"	3:41
4.	"Andante, Andante"	4:38
5.	"Me and I"	4:53

Side two
No.	Title	Length
1.	"Happy New Year"	4:37
2.	"Our Last Summer"	4:18
3.	"The Piper"	3:25
4.	"Lay All Your Love on Me"	4:33
5.	"The Way Old Friends Do" (recorded live at the Wembley Arena in November 1979)	2:53
Total length:		42:06

=== Deluxe edition ===
Released on 11 May 2011, for the album's 30th anniversary. All tracks are written by Benny Andersson and Björn Ulvaeus, except where noted.

Bonus tracks
No.	Title	Writer(s)	Length
1.	"Elaine" (B-side of "The Winner Takes It All")		3:45
2.	"On and On and On" (full length version; stereo mix)		4:15
3.	"Put on Your White Sombrero" (first released on Thank You for the Music)		4:34
4.	"Andante, Andante" (Spanish version)	Andersson; Ulvaeus; Buddy McCluskey; Mary McCluskey	4:40
5.	"Felicidad" (Spanish version of "Happy New Year")	Andersson; Ulvaeus; B. McCluskey; M. McCluskey	4:24

== Personnel ==
Adapted from the album's liner notes.

ABBA

- Anni-Frid Lyngstad – lead vocals (1, 4, 5, 7), co-lead vocals (3, 8, 10), backing vocals
- Agnetha Fältskog – lead vocals (2, 6, 9), co-lead vocals (3, 8, 10), backing vocals
- Björn Ulvaeus – acoustic guitar (1, 5–8), backing vocals
- Benny Andersson – keyboards (1–9), synthesizers (1–9), backing vocals

Additional musicians

- Per Lindvall – drums (1)
- Mike Watson – bass guitar (1, 2)
- Janne Schaffer – guitars (1, 3, 6)
- Åke Sundqvist – percussion (1, 2, 5, 7)
- Ola Brunkert – drums (2–9)
- Lasse Wellander – guitars (2, 4–9), acoustic guitar (8)
- Rutger Gunnarsson – bass guitar (3–9)
- Lars O. Carlsson – saxophones (3)
- Kajtek Wojciechowski – saxophones (3)
- Janne Kling – saxophones (3), flutes (8)

Production

- Benny Andersson; Björn Ulvaeus – producers, arrangers
- Michael B. Tretow – engineer
- Rutger Gunnarsson – string arrangements (2)
- Rune Söderqvist – album design
- Lars Larsson – photography

== Charts ==
=== Weekly charts ===
Initial weekly chart performance for Super Trouper
Chart (1980–81)	Peak position
Argentinian Albums (CAPIF)	2
Australian Albums (Kent Music Report)	5
Austrian Albums (Ö3 Austria)	3
Belgian Albums (HUMO)	1
Canada Top Albums/CDs (RPM)	8
Danish Albums (Hitlisten)	1
Dutch Albums (Album Top 100)	1
Finnish Albums (Suomen virallinen lista)	1
German Albums (Offizielle Top 100)	1
Japanese Albums (Oricon)	8
New Zealand Albums (RMNZ)	5
Norwegian Albums (VG-lista)	1
Swedish Albums (Sverigetopplistan)	1
Swiss Albums (Schweizer Hitparade)	1
UK Albums (Official Charts)	1
US Billboard 200	17
US Top 100 Albums (Cash Box)	19
US The Album Chart (Record World)	26

Latter weekly chart performance for Super Trouper
Chart (2018–2026)	Peak position
Belgian Albums (Ultratop Flanders)	52
Belgian Albums (Ultratop Wallonia)	178
Dutch Albums (Album Top 100)	23
German Albums (Offizielle Top 100)	32
Norwegian Albums (VG-lista)	20
Scottish Albums (Official Charts)	28
Swedish Albums (Sverigetopplistan)	11
Swiss Albums (Schweizer Hitparade)	63
UK Album Downloads (Official Charts)	66

=== Year-end charts ===
1980 year-end chart performance for Super Trouper
Chart (1980)	Position
Dutch Albums (Album Top 100)	5
UK Albums (OCC)	1

1981 year-end chart performance for Super Trouper
Chart (1981)	Position
Australian Albums (Kent Music Report)	43
Austrian Albums (Ö3 Austria)	4
Canada Top Albums/CDs (RPM)	30
Dutch Albums (Album Top 100)	29
German Albums (Offizielle Top 100)	2
Japanese Albums (Oricon)	41
US Billboard 200	33

=== Decade-end charts ===
1980s decade-end chart performance for Super Trouper
Chart (1980–89)	Position
Austrian Albums (Ö3 Austria)	45

== Certifications and sales ==
Region	Certification	Certified units/sales
Argentina	—	170,000
Australia (ARIA)	Platinum	50,000^{^}
Brazil (Pro-Música Brasil)	Gold	100,000^{*}
Canada	—	400,000
Denmark (IFPI Danmark)	Platinum	20,000^{‡}
Finland (Musiikkituottajat)	Diamond	50,552
France	—	250,000
Germany (BVMI)	2× Platinum	1,000,000
Hong Kong (IFPI Hong Kong)	Platinum	20,000^{*}
Japan (Oricon Charts)	—	219,000
New Zealand (RMNZ)	Platinum	15,000^{‡}
South Africa	—	50,000
Spain (Promusicae)	Platinum	100,000^{^}
United Kingdom (BPI)	Platinum	1,250,000
United Kingdom (BPI) video	Gold	25,000^{^}
United States (RIAA)	Gold	500,000^{^}
Summaries
Worldwide	—	8,000,000
^{*} Sales figures based on certification alone.^{^} Shipments figures based on certification alone.^{‡} Sales+streaming figures based on certification alone.
