= Andante, Andante =

- Ecuadorian single cover

Single by ABBA

from the album Super Trouper
- B-side: "The Piper"
- Released: February 1981
- Recorded: 9 April 1980
- Genre: Europop; pop; Swedish pop
- Length: 4:40
- Label: RCA
- Songwriters: Benny Andersson; Björn Ulvaeus
- Producers: Benny Andersson; Björn Ulvaeus; Michael B. Tretow

ABBA singles chronology
"Happy New Year" (1980)	"Andante, Andante" (1981)	"Lay All Your Love on Me" (1981)

Audio
- "Andante, Andante" on YouTube

"Andante, Andante" is a song recorded by Swedish pop group ABBA for the album Super Trouper. It was released as a single in only two countries, El Salvador and Argentina. It was written by members Benny Andersson and Björn Ulvaeus on 9 April 1980 at Polar Music studios. Initially, this song was called "Hold Me Close". Anni-Frid Lyngstad sang the lead vocals.

== Background ==
"Andante, Andante" is a love song, and the repeated musical term of the title means "at a walking pace" in Italian. The lyrics were translated into Spanish by Buddy and Mary McCluskey and recorded in October 1980 at Polar Music studios.

The song was first released on the album Super Trouper, with the Spanish version included on later reissues of the album, as well as the 1999 reissue of the compilation Oro: Grandes Éxitos. The ABBA tribute choir Andante Andante, founded by Allison Pyke in 2004, takes its name from this song. The Herald describes "Andante, Andante" as having an "Italian" flavour.

Lyngstad recorded a solo version of the song in Spanish in 2017 with Cuban-American trumpeter Arturo Sandoval. This version was released as part of Sandoval's album Ultimate Duets in 2018.

== Charts ==
Chart (2018)	Peak position
Scottish Singles Sales (Official Charts)	81

== Mamma Mia! Here We Go Again version ==
Lily James (Young Donna) recorded "Andante, Andante" for the soundtrack of Mamma Mia! Here We Go Again. Her version was released on 13 July 2018, alongside the rest of the soundtrack, by Capitol and Polydor Records. It was produced by Benny Andersson.

=== Charts ===
Chart (2018)	Peak position
New Zealand Hot Singles (RMNZ)	22
Scottish Singles Sales (Official Charts)	36
UK Singles (Official Charts)	61

=== Certifications ===
Region	Certification	Certified units/sales
New Zealand (RMNZ)	Gold	15,000^{‡}
United Kingdom (BPI)	Silver	200,000^{‡}
^{‡} Sales+streaming figures based on certification alone.
