= Elaine (song) =

Song by ABBA

from the album Super Trouper (2001 reissue)
- A-side: "The Winner Takes It All"
- Released: July 21, 1980
- Recorded: 5 February 1980
- Studio: Polar, Stockholm
- Genre: Synth-pop
- Length: 3:44
- Label: Polar Music
- Songwriters: Benny Andersson; Björn Ulvaeus
- Producers: Benny Andersson; Björn Ulvaeus

Audio video
- "Elaine" on YouTube

"Elaine" is a song recorded by Swedish pop group ABBA. It was used as the B-side to the 1980 single "The Winner Takes It All". It was not included on any of their original albums but was later included as a bonus track on the 2001 reissue of Super Trouper.

== Synopsis ==
The song is about a "devil-may-care path in pursuit of love".

== Composition ==
ABBA: Let the Music Speak describes "Elaine" as a "bold and brazen up-tempo number", adding that it has a "wealth of treated synth effects". The pace remains the same throughout the song, and the intro has a "melodic riff that is squeezed and contorted over a series of suspended chords". This is followed by a "whistlable refrain". At the end of the second verse, the synths mimic the girls' voices.

== Analysis ==
The song has a degree of programmatic irony, as the "extrovert nature" of the refrain juxtaposes "Agnetha and Frida's decisive and cutting unison stabs".

== Critical reception ==
Abba – Uncensored on the Record says the song is "OK, in a rather frantic way", and adds that it "paled in comparison," in the author's opinion, to the song it was paired with on the single "The Winner Takes It All".
