= Our Last Summer =

- UK release label as B-side of "Thank You for the Music"

Song by ABBA

from the album Super Trouper
- Released: 3 November 1980
- Recorded: 1980
- Genre: Pop rock
- Length: 4:19
- Label: Polar
- Songwriters: Benny Andersson, Björn Ulvaeus
- Producers: Benny Andersson, Björn Ulvaeus

Audio video
- "Our Last Summer" on YouTube

"Our Last Summer" is a song by ABBA from the group's seventh studio album, Super Trouper. It was written by Benny Andersson and Björn Ulvaeus.

Ulvaeus found lyrical inspiration for the song in a memory of a romance he had when he was a teenager. During a visit to Paris, he met a girl from his home-town who was working as an au pair. "We had not been romantically involved in Sweden," he recalled, "but Paris tends to have that effect on people, and so it was with the two of us. She certainly took me to see the Quartier Latin, the Champs-Élysées and the Eiffel Tower, but to be honest I don't really remember much of Paris. I mostly remember her!"

Recording for the track began on 4 June 1980 in Polar Music Studios. The song features Anni-Frid Lyngstad on lead vocals and her time in the studio during the recording is captured in a series of photographs taken by Anders Hanser.

In the background of the bridge to this song, during Lasse Wellander's guitar solo, part of the Chess song, "Anthem", can be heard. Andersson and Ulvaeus had been working on the melody for "Anthem" for a number of years but had never found a place for it in any ABBA project. When they finally came to use it in the musical Chess, they hoped that no one would notice that part of it had already been used in "Our Last Summer".

The song is featured in the ABBA songs-based musical Mamma Mia!, the 2008 film of the same name, and Thor: Love and Thunder. That version was certified Silver by BPI in 2022.
