= The Winner Takes It All =

1980 song by ABBA

Single by ABBA

from the album Super Trouper
- B-side: "Elaine"
- Released: 21 July 1980
- Recorded: 2–18 June 1980
- Genre: Pop; dance-pop
- Length: 4:54 (album version); 4:20 (US promo edited version)
- Label: Polar
- Songwriters: Benny Andersson; Björn Ulvaeus
- Producers: Benny Andersson; Björn Ulvaeus

ABBA singles chronology
"I Have a Dream" (1979)	"The Winner Takes It All" (1980)	"Super Trouper" (1980)

Music video
- "The Winner Takes It All" on YouTube

Audio video
- "The Winner Takes It All" (US promo edited version on YouTube

"The Winner Takes It All" is a song by the Swedish pop group ABBA, released on 21 July 1980 as the lead single from the group's seventh studio album, Super Trouper (1980). Penned by Björn Ulvaeus and Benny Andersson, it is a ballad in the key of G-flat major featuring Agnetha Fältskog on lead vocals, reflecting on the end of a relationship. Although Ulvaeus has denied the song being about his divorce from Fältskog, he has stated the song is about the experience of a divorce. The single's B-side was the non-album track "Elaine".

Continuing ABBA's streak of successful singles, "The Winner Takes It All" topped the charts in the United Kingdom, where it became their eighth number one hit, as well as in Belgium, Ireland, and the Netherlands. The single became ABBA's fourth and final top ten chart hit in the United States, peaking at number 8 on the Billboard Hot 100. It has since become one of the group's most enduring hits. In a 1999 poll for Channel 5, "The Winner Takes It All" was voted Britain's favourite ABBA song. This feat was replicated in a 2010 poll for ITV. In a 2006 poll for a Channel Five programme, "The Winner Takes It All" was voted "Britain's Favourite Break-Up Song". The song has been covered by multiple artists, the most notable being Cher and Susan Boyle.

== Background ==
Ulvaeus and Andersson started writing "The Winner Takes It All" in the summer of 1979 in a cottage on the island of Viggsö. According to Andersson, the idea for the song suddenly came up "from old ideas, from old small musical pieces" they had. The demo had an original title of "The Story of My Life" and the first arrangement for the song was uptempo with a constant beat. However, they felt their first effort "much too stiff and metrical", so they left the song for a few days while they worked on other songs. Four days later they returned to the song, and Andersson came up with the idea of using a French chanson-style arrangement with a descending piano line and a looser structure. Ulvaeus then recorded a demo using nonsense French words for lyrics, and took the recording home to write the lyric for "The Winner Takes It All". According to Ulvaeus, he drank whiskey while he was writing, and it was the quickest lyric he ever wrote. He said, "I was drunk, and the whole lyric came to me in a rush of emotion in one hour." Ulvaeus said that when he gave the lyrics to Fältskog to read, "a tear or two welled up in her eyes. Because the words really affected her."

Ulvaeus denies the song is about his and Fältskog's divorce, saying the basis of the song "is the experience of a divorce, but it's fiction. 'Cause one thing I can say is that there wasn't a winner or a loser in our case. A lot of people think it's straight out of reality, but it's not." However, Ulvaeus admitted the heartache of their break-up inspired the song, but noted the words in the song should not be taken literally. He said: "Neither Agnetha nor I were winners in our divorce." American critic Chuck Klosterman says "The Winner Takes It All" is "[the only] pop song that examines the self-aware guilt one feels when talking to a person who has humanely obliterated your heart", and finds Ulvaeus' denial hard to believe in light of the original title, which Klosterman reports was "The Story of My Life". The booklet for the double-CD compilation The Definitive Collection states "The Winner Takes It All" is the song where Björn admits the sad experience of his and Agnetha's divorce the previous year left its mark on the lyric.

== Reception ==
The single received acclaim from music critics. Martyn Sutton for Melody Maker labelled the track as "yet another solid gold hit" for the group. Amanda Nicholls for Record Mirror positively reviewed the track, with its "highly professional, smooth production with all the right ingredients, [and] a touch of sadness added to an instantly hummable tune." Record World said: "Gripping vocal drama is augmented forcefully by plush orchestration." Billboard gave the single a recommendation.

It has gone on to be ranked among one of ABBA's best songs. Classic Pop ranked it number nine in their list of ABBA's best songs, and number 28 in their list of the best singles from the 1980s decade. Rob Sheffield from Rolling Stone placed the track at number eight in his ranking of the group's best songs.

== Chart performance ==
"The Winner Takes It All" was a major success for ABBA, hitting No. 1 in Belgium, Ireland, the Netherlands, South Africa and the United Kingdom. It reached the Top 5 in Austria, Finland, France, West Germany, Norway, Sweden, Switzerland and Zimbabwe, while peaking in the Top 10 in Australia, Canada, Italy, Spain and the United States (where it became ABBA's fourth and final American Top 10 hit, peaking at No. 8; the song spent 26 weeks on the Billboard Hot 100 chart, more than any other ABBA single). It was also the group's second Billboard Adult Contemporary #1 (after "Fernando"). "The Winner Takes It All" was also a hit in Brazil: it was included on the soundtrack of Coração Alado ("Winged Heart"), a popular soap opera in 1980, as the main theme.

The track was listed as the 23rd most popular single on the US Billboard year-end chart for 1981.

As of September 2021, it is the group's fifth-biggest song in the UK with 920,000 chart sales (including pure sales and streaming numbers).

== Music video ==
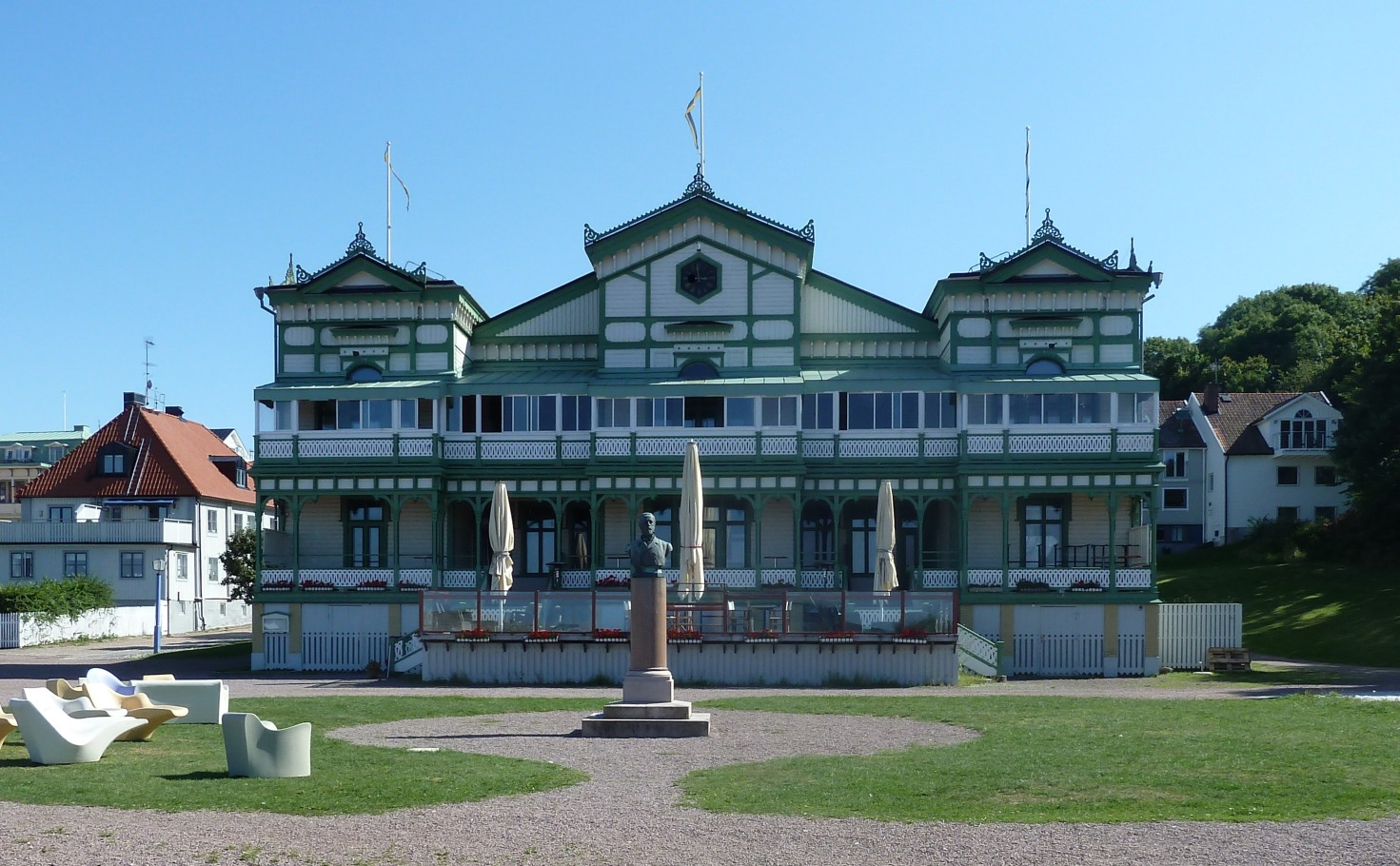
The Societetshuset in Marstrand town, where the music video was filmed in the summer of 1980

A music video to promote the song was filmed in July 1980 on Marstrand, an island on the Swedish west coast. It was directed by Lasse Hallström. Appropriately, the video was shot ten days after the divorce of Björn Ulvaeus and Agnetha Fältskog was officially declared by the courts. It starts with a black-and-white photo montage of ABBA, then moves to the face of Agnetha singing the song. Interspersed in the video is footage of her walking alone, still photographs, and shots of the other happier members of the band.

== Track listing ==
No.	Title	Length
1.	"The Winner Takes It All"	4:55
2.	"Elaine"	3:42

== Personnel ==
- Agnetha Fältskog – lead vocals and backing vocals
- Anni-Frid Lyngstad – backing vocals
- Björn Ulvaeus – backing vocals
- Benny Andersson – piano and backing vocals

=== Additional musicians ===
- Ola Brunkert – drums
- Mike Watson – bass
- Lasse Wellander – electric guitar
- Åke Sundqvist – tambourine
- Rutger Gunnarsson – string arrangements

== Charts ==
=== Weekly charts ===
1980–1981 weekly chart performance for "The Winner Takes It All"
Chart (1980–1981)	Peak position
Argentina (CAPIF)	6
Australia (Kent Music Report)	7
Austria (Ö3 Austria Top 40)	3
Belgium (Ultratop 50 Flanders)	1
Canada Top Singles (CBC)	10
Canada Top Singles (RPM)	70
Costa Rica (Record World)	5
Denmark (IFPI)	3
Dominican Republic (Record World)	8
European Singles (Europarade)	1
Finland (Suomen virallinen lista)	2
France (SNEP)	5
Ireland (IRMA)	1
Israel (C Network)	3
Italy (Billboard)	9
Italy (Musica e dischi)	13
Mexico (Mexican Singles Chart – English)	5
Netherlands (Dutch Top 40)	1
Netherlands (Single Top 100)	1
New Zealand (Recorded Music NZ)	16
Norway (VG-lista)	3
Portugal (Musica & Som)	2
South Africa (Springbok Radio)	1
Spain (AFE)	6
Sweden (Sverigetopplistan)	2
Switzerland (Schweizer Hitparade)	3
Turkey (Milliyet)	4
UK Singles (Official Charts)	1
US Billboard Hot 100	8
US Adult Contemporary (Billboard)	1
US Cash Box Top 100 Singles	11
US National Airplay (Radio & Records)	19
US Pop/Adult Airplay (Radio & Records)	3
West Germany (GfK)	4
Zimbabwe (ZIMA)	4

2018 weekly chart performance for "The Winner Takes It All"
Chart (2018)	Peak position
Finland Airplay (Radiosoittolista)	97

2026 weekly chart performance for "The Winner Takes It All"
Chart (2026)	Peak position
Global Excl. US (Billboard)	198

=== Year-end charts ===
Chart (1980)	Position
Australia (Kent Music Report)	56
Austria (Ö3 Austria Top 40)	16
Belgium (Ultratop Flanders)	1
Germany (Official German Charts)	31
Netherlands (Dutch Top 40)	1
Netherlands (Single Top 100)	9
South Africa (Springbok)	9
UK Singles (OCC)	18

Chart (1981)	Position
Italy (FIMI)	43
US Billboard Hot 100	23
US Adult Contemporary (Billboard)	10
US Cash Box Top 100	74
US A/C (Radio & Records)	28

Chart (2021)	Peak position
Sweden (Sverigetopplistan)	85

== Certifications and sales ==
Region	Certification	Certified units/sales
Brazil (Pro-Música Brasil)	Gold	300,000
Denmark (IFPI Danmark)	Gold	45,000^{‡}
France	—	250,000
Germany (BVMI)	Gold	250,000^{‡}
Italy (FIMI)	Gold	50,000^{‡}
Kenya	—	10,000
Netherlands (NVPI)	Gold	100,000^{^}
New Zealand (RMNZ)	Platinum	30,000^{‡}
Portugal	—	20,000
Spain (Promusicae)	Platinum	60,000^{‡}
United Kingdom (BPI)	2× Platinum	1,200,000^{‡}
^{^} Shipments figures based on certification alone.^{‡} Sales+streaming figures based on certification alone.

== Notable cover versions ==
- Cher covered the song for her 2018 album Dancing Queen, inspired by Mamma Mia! Here We Go Again, in which she starred.
- Susan Boyle covered the song for her 2012 album Standing Ovation: The Greatest Songs from the Stage.
- Sisters Kylie Minogue and Dannii Minogue, along with the BBC Concert Orchestra, covered the song for the soundtrack of the British sitcom Beautiful People. It was later released on the latter’s greatest hits album This Is It: The Very Best Of.
- Popular French performer Mireille Mathieu has recorded the French version of the song, titled Bravo, tu as gagné. The song was released in 1981 under the Philips label, with Mathieu's 1980 song Viens chanter pour le Bon Dieu on the B-side. Mathieu was accompanied by Anni-Frid, Björn and Benny as her backing vocals, just like in the original version. After its release, Bravo, tu as gagné has become one of Mathieu's most popular songs throughout her career, often finding itself on many of her compilations albums and concert setlists.

== In popular culture ==
- The song is featured in the episode "Winner" in the season four finale of Better Call Saul; a karaoke version is sung by characters Jimmy McGill and Chuck McGill, played by Bob Odenkirk and Michael McKean respectively.

== See also ==
- List of Billboard Adult Contemporary number ones of 1981
