= Happy New Year (song) =

1980 single by ABBA

- Portuguese single cover

Single by ABBA

from the album Super Trouper
- B-side: "Andante, Andante"
- Released: 15 December 1980
- Recorded: 9 April 1980
- Genre: Europop
- Length: 4:23
- Label: Polar; Polydor (Portugal); RCA Victor (Argentina, Peru, El Salvador)
- Songwriters: Benny Andersson; Björn Ulvaeus
- Producers: Andersson; Ulvaeus

ABBA singles chronology
| "On and On and On" (1980) | "Happy New Year" (1980) | "Andante, Andante" (1981) |

Music video
- "Happy New Year" on YouTube

"Happy New Year" is a song by the Swedish recording group ABBA, from their seventh studio album Super Trouper (1980), with lead vocals by Agnetha Fältskog. It was released on 15 December 1980, as the album's fourth overall single, only in Portugal, Argentina, Peru, and El Salvador. The song's working title was "Daddy Don't Get Drunk on Christmas Day".

The Spanish-language version of the song, "Felicidad", was released in 1980 in Spanish-speaking territories. The single charted in the top 5 in Argentina and was included on the South American versions of the Super Trouper album. It was first released on CD as part of the 1994 Polydor US compilation Más ABBA Oro, and in 1999 on the expanded re-release of ABBA Oro: Grandes Éxitos.

== Release ==
In 1999, the English version of the song was re-released for the new millennium, and charted at number 27 in Sweden, number 15 in the Netherlands and number 75 in Germany. In 2008, it was released again in several countries, and charted at number 4 in Sweden, number 6 in Norway and number 25 in Denmark. It re-entered the Swedish and Norwegian charts in 2009 at number 5 in both charts and number 8 in the Netherlands in 2011. It has since gone on to regularly chart in some countries upon the turn of the new year and is regularly played at the same time such as Vietnam.

In Vietnam it is also played during the Têt-holiday. The song's popularity can be traced back to the US trade embargo after the war. Since Sweden didn't join the US trade embargo against Vietnam, Swedish music such as Abba could be imported without restrictions.

In December 2011, a silver glitter vinyl single limited to 500 copies was released, including the songs "Happy New Year" and "The Way Old Friends Do". The edition was available exclusively from the official ABBA site and the ABBA fan site. It was sold out within a day of the release being announced.

Upon the release of ABBA: The 40th Anniversary Singles Box Set on 5 May 2014, an alternate mix of "Andante, Andante" was revealed to have been used on the B-side of the single in the box set instead of the original album version. In 2022, it was the 32nd top best selling vinyl single in the UK.

== Charts ==
=== Spanish version ===
Weekly chart performance for "Felicidad"
| Chart (1981) | Peak position |
|---|---|
| Argentina (CAPIF) | 5 |

=== English version ===
| Year | Chart | Peak position |
|---|---|---|
| 1999–2000 | Germany (GfK) | 75 |
| 1999–2000 | Netherlands (Single Top 100) | 15 |
| 1999–2000 | Norway (VG-lista) | 20 |
| 1999–2000 | Sweden (Sverigetopplistan) | 27 |
| 2005 | CIS Airplay (TopHit) | 83 |
| 2005 | Russia Airplay (TopHit) | 78 |
| 2006 | CIS Airplay (TopHit) | 84 |
| 2007 | CIS Airplay (TopHit) | 81 |
| 2007 | Russia Airplay (TopHit) | 79 |
| 2007 | Sweden (Sverigetopplistan) | 22 |
| 2008 | CIS Airplay (TopHit) | 99 |
| 2008 | Denmark (Tracklisten) | 25 |
| 2008 | Norway (VG-lista) | 11 |
| 2008 | Russia Airplay (TopHit) | 95 |
| 2008 | Sweden (Sverigetopplistan) | 4 |
| 2009 | CIS Airplay (TopHit) | 63 |
| 2009 | Denmark (Tracklisten) | 14 |
| 2009 | Germany (GfK) | 77 |
| 2009 | Norway (VG-lista) | 5 |
| 2009 | Russia Airplay (TopHit) | 56 |
| 2009 | Sweden (Sverigetopplistan) | 5 |
| 2010 | CIS Airplay (TopHit) | 88 |
| 2010 | Denmark (Tracklisten) | 16 |
| 2010 | Germany (GfK) | 88 |
| 2010 | Norway (VG-lista) | 11 |
| 2010 | Russia Airplay (TopHit) | 90 |
| 2010 | Sweden (Sverigetopplistan) | 9 |
| 2011 | CIS Airplay (TopHit) | 182 |
| 2011 | Denmark (Tracklisten) | 15 |
| 2011 | Germany (GfK) | 93 |
| 2011 | Netherlands (Single Top 100) | 8 |
| 2011 | Norway (VG-lista) | 18 |
| 2011 | Sweden (Sverigetopplistan) | 42 |
| 2012 | Denmark (Tracklisten) | 26 |
| 2012 | Germany (GfK) | 75 |
| 2012 | Netherlands (Single Top 100) | 11 |
| 2012 | Sweden (Sverigetopplistan) | 51 |
| 2013 | CIS Airplay (TopHit) | 179 |
| 2013 | Germany (GfK) | 83 |
| 2013 | Netherlands (Single Top 100) | 17 |
| 2013 | Slovenia Airplay (SloTop50) | 21 |
| 2013 | Sweden (Sverigetopplistan) | 57 |
| 2014 | CIS Airplay (TopHit) | 189 |
| 2014 | Germany (GfK) | 83 |
| 2014 | Denmark (Tracklisten) | 38 |
| 2014 | Netherlands (Single Top 100) | 24 |
| 2014 | Slovenia Airplay (SloTop50) | 44 |
| 2014 | Sweden (Sverigetopplistan) | 54 |
| 2015 | CIS Airplay (TopHit) | 136 |
| 2015 | Netherlands (Single Top 100) | 48 |
| 2015 | Sweden (Sverigetopplistan) | 68 |
| 2016 | Slovenia Airplay (SloTop50) | 40 |
| 2016 | Sweden (Sverigetopplistan) | 73 |
| 2017 | Sweden (Sverigetopplistan) | 57 |
| 2018 | Slovenia Airplay (SloTop50) | 33 |
| 2018 | Sweden (Sverigetopplistan) | 51 |
| 2018 | UK Physical Chart (OCC) | 3 |
| 2019 | Slovenia Airplay (SloTop50) | 46 |
| 2019 | Sweden (Sverigetopplistan) | 38 |
| 2019 | Switzerland (Schweizer Hitparade) | 86 |
| 2020 | CIS Airplay (TopHit) | 184 |
| 2020 | Slovenia Airplay (SloTop50) | 33 |
| 2020 | Sweden (Sverigetopplistan) | 42 |
| 2020 | Ukraine Airplay (TopHit) | 172 |
| 2021 | Slovenia Airplay (SloTop50) | 18 |
| 2022 | CIS Airplay (TopHit) | 97 |
| 2022 | Finland Airplay (Radiosoittolista) | 93 |
| 2022 | Russia Airplay (TopHit) | 88 |
| 2022 | Sweden (Sverigetopplistan) | 22 |
| 2022 | Vietnam (Vietnam Hot 100) | 29 |
| 2023 | CIS Airplay (TopHit) | 114 |
| 2023 | Russia Airplay (TopHit) | 89 |
| 2023 | Sweden (Sverigetopplistan) | 26 |
| 2024 | CIS Airplay (TopHit) | 125 |
| 2024 | Estonia Airplay (TopHit) | 96 |
| 2024 | Israel International Airplay (Media Forest) | 14 |
| 2024 | Kazakhstan Airplay (TopHit) | 66 |
| 2024 | Latvia Airplay (TopHit) | 9 |
| 2024 | Lithuania Airplay (TopHit) | 1 |
| 2024 | Norway (VG-lista) | 4 |
| 2024 | Russia Airplay (TopHit) | 56 |
| 2024 | Sweden (Sverigetopplistan) | 9 |
| 2025 | CIS Airplay (TopHit) | 67 |
| 2025 | Russia Streaming (TopHit) | 54 |
| 2025 | Sweden (Sverigetopplistan) | 13 |
| 2026 | Kazakhstan Airplay (TopHit) | 91 |
| 2026 | Israel International Airplay (Media Forest) | 7 |
| 2026 | Latvia Airplay (LaIPA) | 18 |
| 2026 | Netherlands (Single Top 100) | 40 |
| 2026 | Netherlands (Nationale Airplay Top 50) | 26 |
| 2026 | Russia Airplay (TopHit) | 93 |
| 2026 | Russia Streaming (TopHit) | 30 |
| 2026 | Sweden (Sverigetopplistan) | 9 |

== Certifications ==
| Region | Certification | Certified units/sales |
|---|---|---|
| Denmark (IFPI Danmark) | Gold | 45,000^{‡} |
^{‡} Sales+streaming figures based on certification alone.

== A-Teens version ==
"Happy New Year"

Single by A-Teens
- Released: 3 December 1999
- Genre: Pop
- Length: 4:24
- Label: Universal Music Group
- Songwriters: Benny Andersson; Björn Ulvaeus
- Producers: Björn Stigsson; Andreas Rickstrand

A-Teens singles chronology
| "Gimme! Gimme! Gimme! (A Man After Midnight)" (1999) | "Happy New Year" (1999) | "Dancing Queen" (2000) |

Audio video
- "Happy New Year" on YouTube

The song was covered by the A-Teens, and released as a single in 1999. The single was released to celebrate the arrival of the new millennium: thus, the last line in the song's third verse is altered to "in the end of ninety-nine", as opposed to the original's "in the end of eighty-nine". It reached number 4 on the Swedish charts, becoming the band's fourth consecutive top ten in the country and earning a Gold certification weeks after its release. The single was only released in selected countries, including Chile, after their visit there in February 2000. A music video was made to support the single's release.

=== Track listing ===
Scandinavian 2-track CD single

1. "Happy New Year" (radio version) – 4:24
2. "Happy New Year" (extended version) – 6:52

Scandinavian CD Maxi

1. "Happy New Year" (radio version) – 4:24
2. "Happy New Year" (extended version) – 6:52
3. "Mamma Mia" (The Bold & the Beautiful Glamourmix Edit) – 3:46
4. "Super Trouper" (W.I.P.) – 6:10

=== Charts ===
| Chart (1999–2000) | Peak position |
|---|---|
| Finland (Suomen virallinen lista) | 12 |
| Sweden (Sverigetopplistan) | 4 |

=== Year-end charts ===
| Chart (1999) | Position |
|---|---|
| Sweden (Hitlistan) | 82 |
