= Pandora discography =

- Studio albums: 10
- Compilation albums: 5
- Singles: 37
- Remixes: 1

The discography of Swedish eurodance singer Pandora consists of ten studio albums, one Remix albums, four compilations and thirty-seven singles.

== Albums ==
=== Studio albums ===
Title	Details	Peak chart positions				Certifications
Title	Details	SWE	AUS	FIN	JPN	Certifications
One of a Kind	Released: November 1993; Label: Virgin Records; Format: CD, Cassette	12	150	2		GLF: Gold
Tell the World	Released: February 1995; Label: Virgin Records; Format: CD, Cassette	11	—	3	19	GLF: Gold; Japan: 455,000+ sales; RIAJ: Gold
Changes	Released: December 1996; Label: MCA Records, Universal Music; Format: CD, Cassette	29	—	4	15	RIAJ: Platinum
This Could Be Heaven	Released: December 1997; Label: Universal Music, EMI Music; Format: CD, Cassette	—	—	19	16	RIAJ: Platinum
Breathe	Released: February 1999; Label: Universal Music; Format: CD, Cassette	—	—	—	5	RIAJ: Gold
No Regrets	Released: 1999; Label: Universal Music; Format: CD, Cassette	—	—	—	11	
A Little Closer	Released: February 2001; Label: Universal Music; Format: CD, Cassette	—	—	—	31	
Won't Look Back	Released: February 2002; Label: Westridge Music / EMI Music; Format: CD, Cassette	—	—	40		
9 Lives	Released: 23 September 2003 (Japan); Label: Westridge Music / EMI Music; Format: CD, Cassette	16	—	—		
Head Up High	Released: 30 March 2011 (Finland); Label: AXR Records / Glen Disc; Format: CD, digital download	—	—	—		
"—" denotes album that did not chart or was not released.

=== Remix albums ===
Title	Details	Peak chart positions		Certifications
Title	Details	SWE	FIN	Certifications
Celebration (United DJs vs. Pandora)	Released: 7 November 2007; Label: Capitol Records; Format: CD, digital download	38	—	

=== Compilation albums ===
Title	Details	Certifications
Best of Pandora	Released: February 1997; Label: Virgin Records; Format: CD, Cassette	GLF: Gold
Pandora's Hit Box	Released: 21 March 1998 (Japan only); Label: Universal Records; Format: CD, Cassette	
Blue	Released: 1999 (Australia only); Label: Universal Music Australia; Format: CD, Cassette	Note peaked at number 101 on the ARIA charts.
Non-Stop	Released: September 1999 (Japan only); Label: Universal Records; Format: CD, Cassette	
Greatest Hits & Remixes	Released: 9 September 2005; Label: Stockhouse; Format: CD, Cassette	

== Singles ==
Year	Single	Peak chart positions					Album
Year	Single	SWE	FIN	NOR	AUS	EUR	Album
1993	"Trust Me"	3	2	8	82	28	One of a Kind
1993	"Come On and Do It"	5	4	—	166	51	One of a Kind
1994	"One of a Kind"	33	19	—	—	—	One of a Kind
1994	"Something's Gone"	18	—	—	—	—	One of a Kind
1994	"Tell the World"	5	3	—	—	53	Tell the World
1995	"Don't You Know"	7	1	—	—	41	Tell the World
1995	"The Naked Sun"	29	3	—	—	98	Tell the World
1995	"One of Us"	13	1	—	—	46	Tell the World
1996	"A Little Bit"	28	3	—	10	—	Changes
1997	"Smile 'n' Shine"	45	15	—	17	—	Changes
1997	"The Sands of Time"	—	—	—	—	—	Changes
1997	"Single Life"	—	—	—	—	—	This Could Be Heaven
1997	"Show Me What You Got"	—	—	—	—	—	This Could Be Heaven
1998	"Spirit to Win"	—	—	—	—	—	This Could Be Heaven
1998	"Bright Eyes"	—	—	—	—	—	Pandora's Hit Box / Breathe
1998	"This Could Be Heaven"	—	—	—	100	—	This Could Be Heaven
1998	"You Drive Me Crazy"	—	10	—	—	—	This Could Be Heaven
1998	"Mr. Right"	—	—	—	—	—	This Could Be Heaven
1999	"You'll Be Alright"	—	—	—	—	—	Breathe
1999	"You Don't Want to Know"	—	—	—	—	—	Breathe
1999	"I Won't Look Back" / "No Regrets"	—	—	—	—	—	No Regrets
2001	"I Need to Know" / "Every Second Beat"	—	—	—	—	—	A Little Closer
2001	"Don't Worry"	—	—	—	—	—	A Little Closer
2002	"I Won't Look Back"	—	—	—	—	—	Won't Look Back
2002	"When I'm Over You"	—	—	—	—	—	Won't Look Back
2003	"You"	56	—	—	—	—	9 Lives
2003	"Don't Worry" (re-release)	—	—	—	—	—	9 Lives
2004	"Runaway"	—	—	—	—	—	9 Lives
2004	"I'm Confused"	6	—	—	—	—	9 Lives
2006	"Trust Me"(United DJs vs. Pandora)	2	—	—	—	—	Celebration
2007	"Don't You Know"(United DJs vs. Pandora)	1	2	—	—	—	Celebration
2007	"Tell the World"(United DJs vs. Pandora)	7	12	—	—	—	Celebration
2007	"On a Night Like This"(United DJs vs. Pandora)	3	—	—	—	—	Celebration
2008	"Call Me" (DeeJay Jay feat. Pandora)	5	—	—	—	—	N/A
2009	"Kitchy Kitchy" (Pandora feat. Bloom 06)	7	—	—	—	—	Head Up High
2010	"You Believed" (Pandora feat. Matt Hewie)	3	—	—	—	—	Head Up High
2011	"You Woke My Heart" (Pandora feat. JS16)	—	—	—	—	—	Head Up High
2011	"Why" (Pandora feat. Stacy)	—	—	—	—	—	Head Up High
2012	"Kom Igen"	—	—	—	—	—	N/A
2013	"I Feel Alive"	—	—	—	—	—	N/A
2021	"I Love You" (Teflon Brothers x Pandora)	—	2	—	—	—	N/A
2025	"Love Is Glue" (with Pasi Ja Anssi and Sam Pope)	—	—	—	—	—	N/A
"—" denotes releases that did not chart
