= Best of Pandora =

Greatest hits album by Pandora
- Released: February 1997
- Recorded: 1993–1995
- Genre: Electronic; dance; Eurodance; house; Hi NRG; pop
- Label: Virgin Records

Pandora chronology
Changes (1996)	Best of Pandora (1997)	This Could Be Heaven (1997)

Best of Pandora is the first greatest hits album by Swedish Eurodance singer Pandora. It features tracks from Pandora's first two studio album, One of a Kind and Tell the World. The album was released in February 1997.

The album includes four Swedish top ten and six Finnish top ten singles.

== Track listing ==
1. "Trust Me" – 3:25
2. "Tell the World" – 3:37
3. "Come On And Do It" – 3:18
4. "Don't You Know" – 3:49
5. "One of a Kind" – 3:37
6. "The Naked Sun" – 3:58
7. "Something's Gone" (Ragga Dance Cut) – 4:21
8. "Take My Hand" – 3:52
9. "One of Us" – 4:46
10. "Going to the Top" – 3:47
11. "Love is a Stranger" – 3:45
12. "Get Your Chance" – 4:00
13. "Rely" – 4:24
14. "Come On And Do It" (Rhythm Takes Control Mix) – 6:02
15. "Tell the World" (Straight Outta Kalahari) – 3:49
16. "The Naked Sun" (The Beduin House Camp) – 4:16
17. "Don't You Know" (Peka P's Alternative Cut) – 5:35
18. "Something's Gone" (Original Version) – 4:16

== Certifications ==
Region	Certification	Certified units/sales
Sweden (GLF)	Gold	40,000^{^}
^{^} Shipments figures based on certification alone.

== Release history ==
Region	Date	Format	Label	Catalogue
Scandinavia	February 1997	CD, Cassette	Virgin Records	7243 8 72919 2
