= Greatest Hits & Remixes (Pandora album) =

Greatest hits album by Pandora
- Released: 9 September 2005
- Recorded: 1993–1995
- Genre: Electronic; dance; Eurodance; house; Hi NRG; pop
- Length: 78:06
- Label: Stockhouse

Pandora chronology
9 Lives (2003)	Greatest Hits & Remixes (2005)	Celebration (2007)

Greatest Hits & Remixes is the fourth greatest hits album by Swedish Eurodance singer Pandora. It features tracks from Pandora's first two studio album, One of a Kind and Tell the World. The album was released worldwide in September 2005.

The album includes four Swedish top ten and six Finnish top ten singles.

== Track listing ==
1. "Trust Me" – 3:25
2. "Come On And Do It" – 3:18
3. "One of a Kind" – 3:38
4. "Something's Gone" (Ragga Dance Cut) – 4:06
5. "Tell the World" – 3:41
6. "Don't You Know" – 3:51
7. "The Naked Sun" – 4:00
8. "One of Us" (Radio edit) – 3:59
9. "Trust Me" (Deeply Short mix) – 3:50
10. "Come On And Do It" (The Funky Ride Version II) – 4:14
11. "One of a Kind" (Naked Eye remix) – 4:32
12. "Tell the World" (Birch'N'Chris remix) – 6:15
13. "The Naked Sun" (The Beduin House Camp) – 4:18
14. "Don't You Know" (Clock's Ten to Two Radio mix) – 3:23
15. "Don't You Know" (Man City Vocal) – 6:56
16. "Come On and Do It" (Rhythm Takes Control mix) – 6:00
17. "Something's Gone" (Orbital Trance edit) – 3:44
18. "Something's Gone" (Original version) – 4:45

== Release history ==
Region	Date	Format	Label	Catalogue
worldwide	9 September 2005	CD, download	Stockhouse	STOCKCDA 15
