= Pandora's Hit Box =

Greatest hits album by Pandora
- Released: 21 March 1998
- Recorded: 1993–1998
- Genre: Electronic; dance; Eurodance; house; Hi NRG; pop
- Label: Universal Music

Pandora chronology
This Could Be Heaven (1997)	Pandora's Hit Box (1998)	Breathe (1999)

Singles from Pandora's Hit Box
- 1. "Bright Eyes" Released: 21 March 1998

Pandora's Hit Box is the second greatest hits album by Swedish Eurodance singer Pandora. The album was only released in Japan. It features tracks from Pandora's studio albums One of a Kind, Tell the World, Changes and This Could Be Heaven. The album was released in March 1998.

The album included the track "Spirit to Win" which was the official track of the 1998 Winter Olympics in Nagano, Japan and a cover of Art Garfunkel's "Bright Eyes", which was released as the first and only single.

== Track listing ==
1. "Don't You Know" (featuring M. Fuse) – 3:49
2. "Show Me What You Got" (featuring Patrick Ntumba) – 3:22
3. "Smile 'n' Shine" (UK Remix) – 3:26
4. "A Little Bit" – 3:27
5. "Tell the World" (featuring M. Fuse) – 3:39
6. "Spirit to Win" – 3:07
7. "The Sands of Time" – 3:45
8. "If This Isn't Love (What Is It)" – 3:20
9. "Bright Eyes" – 4:27
10. "Single Life" – 3:39
11. "Love And Glory" – 4:02
12. "One of Us" – 3:57
13. "Smile 'n' Shine" (Triad Mix) – 8:59
14. "The Sands of Time" (Espanola Way Mix) – 3:25
15. "Tell the World" (Acoustic Version) – 3:34
16. "Mega Mix" – 12:44

== Release history ==
Region	Date	Format	Label	Catalogue
Japan	21 March 1998	CD	Universal Music	MVCE 24069
