= Celebration (United DJ's vs. Pandora album) =

Remix album by United DJ's vs. Pandora
- Released: 7 November 2007
- Genre: Electronic music; Eurodance; house; progressive trance
- Label: Capitol Records

Pandora albums chronology
Greatest Hits & Remixes (2005)	Celebration (2007)	Head Up High (2011)

Singles from Celebration
- 1. "Trust Me" Released: September 2006; 2. "Don't You Know" Released: 17 January 2007; 3. "Tell the World" Released: July 2007; 4. "On a Night Like This" Released: November 2007

Celebration is a remix album credited to United DJ's vs. Pandora. The album contains new remixes of some of Pandora's biggest hits. The album was released worldwide in November 2007 and spawned four top 10 singles in Sweden.

== Track listing ==
1. "On a Night Like This" (JS16 L8 Nite Radio Edit) – 6:10
2. "One of a Kind" (Koyra's Electro Mix) – 3:28
3. "One of Us" (Vinylshakerz 101 Mix) – 5:52
4. "The Naked Sun" (Desert Heave Rock Mix) – 4:06
5. "Come On And Do It" (Playmaker's Do It Mix) – 3:21
6. "Tell the World" (Pitchtunes Vs. Playmaker Radio Edit) – 3:09
7. "Trust Me" (Vasco & Millboy Radio Edit) – 3:47
8. "Don't You Know" (Soundcruiser's Radio Edit) – 3:42
9. "Don't Worry" (Worry Free Mix) – 5:08
10. "The Sands of Time" (Flamenco Edit) – 3:25
11. "On a Night Like This" (Playmaker's Mix) – 3:41
12. "Come On and Do It" (JS16 Do It Mix) – 5:35
13. "Don't Worry" (Blue House Effect in Effect Mix) – 5:54
14. "Don't You Know" (Magic Mitch & DJ Nico Reagaton Mix) – 7:21
15. "Tell the World" (Groove Maniax Casablanca Edit) – 3:17
16. "Trust Me" (Vasco & Millboy Extended) – 6:11

== Charts ==
Chart (2007)	Peak position
Swedish Albums (Sverigetopplistan)	38

== Release history ==
Region	Date	Format	Label	Catalogue
Worldwide	7 November 2007	CD, Digital download	Capitol Records	50999 513719 2 0
Japan	20 August 2008	CD, Digital download	Canyon International	PCCY-01892
