= 9 Lives (Pandora album) =

Studio album by Pandora
- Released: 26 September 2003
- Genre: Europop pop
- Label: Mariann Records, Virgin Records, EMI Music
- Producer: Johan Fransson; Jon Wesamaa; Jonas Stadling; Jorgen Ringqvist; Lars "Dille" Diedricdon; Magnus John; Maki Kolemainen; Mats Nyman; Mika Metala; Pandora; Sami Lehto; Tommy Ekman Christer Sandelin; Tim Larsson; Tobias Lundgrenn; Tomas Axelsson; Tracy Lipp

Pandora chronology
Won't Look Back (2002)	9 Lives (2003)	Greatest Hits & Remixes (2005)

Singles from 9 Lives
- 1. "You" Released: February 2003; 2. "Don't Worry" Released: 2003; 3. "Runaway" Released: February 2004; 4. "I'm Confused" Released: October 2004; 5. "A Love Like This (promo) " Released: 2005

9 Lives is the ninth studio album by Swedish singer Pandora, released in Japan in September 2003, in Scandinavia in June 2005 and Internationally in September 2006. The album peaked at number 16 on the Swedish Charts, becoming Pandora's third top twenty album, and first since Tell the World in 1995.

The album includes Pandora's two Melodifestivalen songs, "You" in 2003 and "Runaway" in 2004, with neither progressing past the semi-finals.

On the album sleeve, Pandora writes; "9 albums in 10 years, I feel so fortunate. This is music that has been in my head for quite sometime waiting... growing... Thanks to all of you who have been following me over the years and welcome to the new listeners".

== Track listing ==
=== Japanese version ===
1. "A Love Like This" – 3:24
2. "Girl in a Daydream" – 2:59
3. "Chapter One" – 3:32
4. "Tomorrow Comes Too Soon" – 3:45
5. "Best Friends" – 4:08
6. "I'll Be Gone" – 3:30
7. "You" – 3:03
8. "When I'm Over You" – 3:41
9. "Invisible Girl" – 3:38
10. "Been All Around" – 3:59
11. "You & I" – 3:20
12. "I'm the Better Woman" – 3:11
13. "Summer Rain" – 3:59
14. "Never Give Up" – 4:19

=== Scandinavian/International version ===
1. "A Love Like This" – 3:24
2. "I'm Confused" – 3:33
3. "Runaway" – 2:52
4. "Girl in a Daydream" – 2:59
5. "Tomorrow Comes Too Soon" – 3:45
6. "Best Friends" – 4:08
7. "I'll Be Gone" – 3:30
8. "You" – 3:03
9. "Don't Worry" – 4:00
10. "Chapter One" – 3:32
11. "You & I" – 3:20
12. "Invisible Girl" – 3:38
13. "I'm the Better Woman" – 3:11

== Charts ==
Chart (2005)	Peak position
Swedish Albums (Sverigetopplistan)	16

== Release history ==
Region	Date	Format	Label	Catalogue
Japan	26 September 2003	CD	Mariann Records, Virgin Records	VJCP-68490
Scandinavia	June 2005	CD, Digital download	EMI Finland, Westridge Music	7243 875452 2 9
Worldwide	26 September 2006	Digital download	Mariann Grammofon	

=== Video games ===
The songs "A Love Like This" and "Girl in a Daydream" are included in the arcade games Dance Dance Revolution SuperNova, Dance Dance Revolution SuperNova 2 and Dance Dance Revolution X. The Japanese PlayStation 2 version of the first SuperNova game also included both songs.
