= List of number-one singles of 1995 (Finland) =

This is the list of the number-one singles of the Finnish Singles Chart in 1995.

Issue date	Song	Artist
1/1995	"Super Gut"	Mo-Do
2/1995	"Super Gut"	Mo-Do
3/1995	"Kourin, kourin"	Sikaduo
4/1995	"Kourin, kourin"	Sikaduo
5/1995	"Kourin, kourin"	Sikaduo
6/1995	"Don't You Know"	Pandora
7/1995	"Don't You Know"	Pandora
8/1995	"Club Bizarre"	U96
9/1995	"Club Bizarre"	U96
10/1995	"Club Bizarre"	U96
11/1995	"Everytime You Touch Me"	Moby
12/1995	"Poison"	The Prodigy
13/1995	"Poison"	The Prodigy
14/1995	"Scatman (Ski-Ba-Bop-Ba-Dop-Bop)"	Scatman John
15/1995	"Scatman (Ski-Ba-Bop-Ba-Dop-Bop)"	Scatman John
16/1995	"Scatman (Ski-Ba-Bop-Ba-Dop-Bop"	Scatman John
17/1995	"Fly Away"	Haddaway
18/1995	"Scatman (Ski-Ba-Bop-Ba-Dop-Bop)"	Scatman John
19/1995	"Ristinolla"	Movetron
20/1995	"Ristinolla"	Movetron
21/1995	"Scatman (Ski-Ba-Bop-Ba-Dop-Bop)"	Scatman John
22/1995	"This Ain't a Love Song"	Bon Jovi
23/1995	"This Ain't a Love Song"	Bon Jovi
24/1995	"Scream"	Michael Jackson & Janet Jackson
25/1995	"Hold Me, Thrill Me, Kiss Me, Kill Me"	U2
26/1995	"Scatman's World"	Scatman John
27/1995	"Scatman's World"	Scatman John
28/1995	"One of Us"	Pandora
29/1995	"One of Us"	Pandora
30/1995	"One of Us"	Pandora
31/1995	"This Time I'm Free"	Dr. Alban
32/1995	"Shy Guy"	Diana King
33/1995	"Shy Guy"	Diana King
34/1995	"Shy Guy"	Diana King
35/1995	"Shut Up (and Sleep with Me)"	Sin with Sebastian
36/1995	"Shy Guy"	Diana King
37/1995	"Tuhat yötä"	Samuli Edelmann & Sani
38/1995	"Hard as a Rock"	AC/DC
39/1995	"Hard as a Rock"	AC/DC
40/1995	"Man on the Edge"	Iron Maiden
41/1995	"Lucky Love"	Ace of Base
42/1995	"Lucky Love"	Ace of Base
43/1995	"Lucky Love"	Ace of Base
44/1995	"Gangsta's Paradise"	Coolio featuring L.V.
45/1995	"Gangsta's Paradise"	Coolio featuring L.V.
46/1995	"Gangsta's Paradise"	Coolio featuring L.V.
47/1995	"Gangsta's Paradise"	Coolio featuring L.V.
48/1995	"Gangsta's Paradise"	Coolio featuring L.V.
49/1995	"Gangsta's Paradise"	Coolio featuring L.V.
50/1995	"Gangsta's Paradise"	Coolio featuring L.V.
51/1995	"Gangsta's Paradise"	Coolio featuring L.V.
