= Won't Look Back =

Won't Look Back may refer to:

- Won't Look Back (album), 2002
- "Won't Look Back" (song), 2014
