= I'm Confused =

Single by Pandora

from the album 9 Lives
- Released: October 2004
- Recorded: 2004
- Studio: Stocksund, Stockholm, Sweden
- Genre: Dance; Eurodance; house
- Length: 3:36
- Label: Mariann, EMI Finland
- Songwriters: Samuel Engh; Jane Ell; Winston Sela
- Producers: Samuel Engh; Pandora

Pandora singles chronology
"Runaway" (2004)	"I'm Confused" (2004)	"Trust Me" (2006)

"I'm Confused" is a song by Swedish singer Pandora. It was released in October 2004 as the fourth and final single from the Swedish version of Pandora's ninth studio album 9 Lives (2003).

== Chart performance ==
Chart (1994)	Peak position
Sweden (Sverigetopplistan)	6
