= You Believed =

Single by Pandora featuring Matt Hewie

from the album Head Up High
- Released: 19 April 2010
- Studio: Streamline studio, Sweden
- Genre: Dance; Eurodance; House; Progressive house
- Length: 3:31
- Label: Golden Artists
- Songwriters: Henrik Andersson; Michael Clauss; Pandora
- Producer: Matt Hewie

Pandora singles chronology
"Kitchy Kitchy" (2009)	"You Believed" (2010)	"You Woke My Heart" (2011)

"You Believed" is a song by Swedish singer Pandora featuring Matt Hewie. The song was released in April 2010 as the second single from Pandora's tenth studio album Head Up High (2011). The song peaked at number 3 on the Swedish charts, becoming Pandora's twelfth top ten single in Sweden.

Music website Scandipop described "You Believed" as "a club pop oriented mixture of euro house and electro house", but found it "really quite underwhelming".

== Track listing ==
- CD single / Digital download
1. "You Believed" (Radio Edit) - 3:31
2. "You Believed" (Extended) - 6:11
3. "You Believed" (Euroversion Mix) - 2:57
- Remixes
1. "You Believed" (Radio Edit) - 3:32
2. "You Believed" (Slow Piano String Version) - 3:29
3. "You Believed" (Mediterranean Sunset Swing Radio Edit) - 3:37
4. "You Believed" (Eurovision Mix) - 2:56
5. "You Believed" (BEEZED Radio) - 3:33
6. "You Believed" (Patric Remann & Amir Hakim Radio) - 4:08
7. "You Believed" (Mitch Remix) - 7:06
8. "You Believed" (Aurelle & Jacquet's Belgrade Splav Remix) - 6:11
9. "You Believed" (Extended Version) - 6:11
10. "You Believed" (Mediterranean Sunset Swing Extended) - 7:04
11. "You Believed" (BEEZED Remix) - 5:42
12. "You Believed" (Patric Remann & Amir Hakim Extended) - 5:07

== Chart performance ==
Chart (2010)	Peak position
Sweden (Sverigetopplistan)	3
