= Breathe (Pandora album) =

Studio album by Pandora
- Released: 19 February 1999
- Recorded: 1998
- Studio: EZ Studios, PAD Studios, Future Sounds Studio, Dreamhouse Studios
- Genre: Electronic; pop; Europop; house
- Length: 67:14
- Label: Universal Music
- Producer: Daniel Papalexis; Kee Marcello; Kurt Sahlén; Mats Nyman; Marko Rakascan

Pandora chronology
Pandora's Hit Box (1998)	Breathe (1999)	No Regrets (1999)

Singles from Breathe
- 1. "You'll Be Alright" Released: 21 January 1999; 2. "You Don't Want to Know" Released: 21 April 1999

Breathe is the fifth studio album by Swedish singer Pandora. It was released in February 1999 by Universal Records.

== Track listing ==
1. "You'll Be Alright" (Daniel Andreasson, Daniel Papalexis) – 3:46
2. "My Own Way" (Pandora, Papalexis) – 4:01
3. "You Don't Want to Know" (Papalexis, Kadir Taysir, Rami Yacoub) – 3:42
4. "Talk to Me" (Kee Marcello, Kurt Sahlén) – 3:31
5. "Free Zone" (Pandora, Mats Nyman) – 3:40
6. "Breathe" (Pandora, Nyman) – 4:06
7. "Mama" (Pandora, Nyman) – 3:59
8. "Tell Me" (Papalexis, Yacoub) – 3:50
9. "I Can Get It" (Pandora, Papalexis) – 4:25
10. "Love Don't Need No Lies" (Papalexis, Taysir) – 3:42
11. "A Broken Soul" (Pandora, Nyman) – 4:00
12. "Act of Faith" (Diane Warren) – 4:08
13. "Do You Want Me Back" (Pandora, Papalexis, Jocelyn Mathieu, Marko Rakascan) – 3:22
14. "Sayonara" (Marcello, Sahlén) – 3:15
15. "Bright Eyes" (Mike Batt) – 3:47 (bonus track)
16. "This Could Be Heaven" (Single Edit) (Mark Taylor, Paul Barry) – 4:02 (bonus track)

== Release history ==
Region	Date	Format	Label	Catalogue
Japan	19 Feb 1999	CD	Universal Music	MVCZ-10035
Scandinavia	1999	CD	Universal Music	UMD 70111

== Certifications ==
Region	Certification	Certified units/sales
Japan (RIAJ)	Gold	100,000^{^}
^{^} Shipments figures based on certification alone.
