= Mikko Peltonen =

Finnish professional ice hockey forward (born 1982)

- Born: 30 July 1982 (age 44) Pori, Finland
- Height: 188 cm (6 ft 2 in)
- Weight: 84 kg (185 lb; 13 st 3 lb)
- Position: Forward
- Shot: Left
- Played for: Ässät; FPS; Sport; Jokipojat; TuTo
- NHL draft: Undrafted
- Playing career: 2001–2004

Mikko Peltonen (born 30 July 1982) is a Finnish former ice hockey player who also competed in rink bandy. Born in Pori, Finland, he developed through the junior ranks of Ässät.

Peltonen played nine games in the SM-liiga with Ässät across the 2001–02, 2002–03, and 2003–04 seasons, failing to register a point. He also appeared in 39 Mestis games for FPS, Sport, and TuTo, recording 9 goals and 6 assists for 15 points. In addition, he played four Suomi-sarja games for Jokipojat, tallying 3 goals and 1 assist for 4 points.

In rink bandy, Peltonen played five seasons in the Finnish Rink Bandy Championship. He appeared in 98 league games, recording 181 goals and 131 assists for a total of 312 points.

== Personal life ==
Since 2014, Peltonen has been engaged to Swedish singer Pandora (Anneli Magnusson). The couple met in 2013. They share a home in Vantaa, while Magnusson also maintains a residence in Sweden, where she lives with her son. Peltonen works as a regional manager for Dressmann and also serves as Pandora's tour DJ.
