= You (Pandora song) =

Single by Pandora

from the album 9 Lives
- Released: February 2003
- Recorded: 2002
- Genre: Europop pop
- Length: 3:00
- Label: M&L Records
- Songwriter(s): Jan Johansen; Shirley Clamp; Tania Clamp
- Producer(s): Christer Sandelin; Jonas Stadling; Tomas Axelsson; Tommy Ekman

Pandora singles chronology
"When I'm Over You" (2002)	"You" (2003)	"Don't Worry" (2003)

"You" is a song by Swedish singer Pandora. It was released in February 2003 as the lead single from Pandora's ninth studio album 9 Lives (2003).

Pandora entered the song into the Melodifestivalen 2003, a song competition to determine the Swedish entrant into the Eurovision Song Contest. The song competed in the second semi-final on 22 February 2003, coming last.

== Track listing ==
1. "You" (Original Radio Version) - 3:00
2. "You" (NeuroPlastic Alternative Mix) - 4:02
3. "You" (NeuroPlastic Club Mix) - 7:35
4. "You" (NeuroPlastic RubberDub) - 7:35

== Chart performance ==
Chart (2003)	Peak position
Sweden (Sverigetopplistan)	56
