= Call Me (Deejay Jay song) =

Single by Deejay Jay featuring Pandora
- Released: 2 July 2008
- Genre: Europop pop
- Length: 3:17
- Label: Capitol Records
- Songwriter(s): Giorgio Spagna; Ivana Spagna; Larry Pignagnoli
- Producer(s): Deejay Jay; Alphaman

Pandora singles chronology
"On a Night Like This" (2007)	"Call Me" (2008)	"Kitchy Kitchy" (2009)

"Call Me" is a song by Swedish producer Deejay Jay featuring Swedish singer Pandora. The song was released on 2 July 2008 and peaked at number 5 on the Swedish charts.

Deejay Jay and Pandora promoted the track on a European tour in summer 2008.

== Track listing ==
- CD single / Digital download
1. "Call Me" (Radio Edit) - 3:16
2. "Call Me" (Extended Radio) - 5:03
3. "Call Me" (V & M Club Edit) - 3:11
4. "Call Me" (V & M Club Extended Edit) - 5:38

== Chart performance ==
=== Weekly charts ===
Chart (2008)	Peak position
Sweden (Sverigetopplistan)	5

=== Year-end charts ===
Chart (2008)	Position
Sweden (Sverigetopplistan)	64
