= Kitchy Kitchy =

2008 song

"Kitchy Kitchy" is a song written by Georgette Franklin, Gordon Pogoda, Jeremy Monroe and Jonny Elkins. It was recorded by N'Works and DJ Ella in 2008.

== Pandora and Bloom 06 version ==
"Kitchy Kitchy"

Single by Pandora featuring Bloom 06

from the album Head Up High
- Released: 25 September 2009
- Recorded: 2009
- Genre: Dance; Eurodance; House
- Length: 3:14
- Label: Golden Artists
- Songwriters: Georgette Franklin; Gordon Pagoda; Jeremy Monroe; Jonny Elkins
- Producers: Bloom 06 and Pandora

Pandora singles chronology
"Call Me" (2008)	"Kitchy Kitchy" (2009)	"You Believed" (2010)

"Kitchy Kitchy" is a song by Swedish singer Pandora featuring Italian electronic group Bloom 06. The song was released in September 2009 as the lead single from Pandora's eleventh studio album Head Up High (2011). The song peaked at number 7 on the Swedish charts, becoming Pandora's eleventh top ten single in Sweden.

A 5-track remix EP was released on 17 March 2010.

In 2011, Pandora said "I really like the strong feminine message, that women are not 'available' just because men think we're sexy. It was a great pleasure to co-produce it with Maurice and Gianfranco from Eiffel 65 (now Bloom 06) and perform it together with them in front of 15,000 people at the Pride festival in Stockholm summer of 2009."

=== Reception ===
Scandipop said; "It’s a fun pop record that doesn’t require you to do anything but nod your head in appreciative satisfaction."

=== Track listing ===
- digital download
1. "Kitchy Kitchy" – 3:14
- remixes
1. "Kitchy Kitchy" – 3:12
2. "Kitchy Kitchy" [Bloom06 Remix] – 5:58
3. "Kitchy Kitchy" [Playmaker Minimal House Version] – 5:33
4. "Kitchy Kitchy" [United Forces R&B Edit] – 3:13
5. "Kitchy Kitchy" [United Forces E-Mix] – 3:52

=== Chart performance ===
Chart (2009)	Peak position
Sweden (Sverigetopplistan)	7
