= Head Up High (Pandora album) =

Studio album by Pandora
- Released: 30 March 2011
- Recorded: 2009–2011
- Genre: Dance; Eurodance; house; pop
- Label: GlenDisc

Pandora chronology
| Celebration (2007) | Head Up High (2011) |

Singles from Head Up High
- 1. "Kitchy Kitchy" Released: 25 September 2009; 2. "You Believed" Released: 19 April 2010; 3. "You Woke My Heart" Released: 6 April 2011; 4. "Why" Released: 24 September 2011

Head Up High is the tenth studio album by Swedish singer Pandora, released in Finland on 30 March 2011 and worldwide in November 2011.

== Track listing ==
1. "Every 2nd" (featuring Eric Martin) – 3:24
2. "You Woke My Heart" (featuring JS16) – 3:13
3. "Why (Magistral)" (featuring Stacy) – 3:33
4. "Head Up High" – 3:07
5. "You Believed" (featuring Matt Hewie) – 3:35
6. "Kitchy Kitchy" (featuring Bloom 06) – 3:15
7. "Every Time" (featuring Neo Cartoon Lover) – 3:37
8. "Hope (Is All I Have)" – 3:45
9. "Until the Hurt is Gone" – 3:10
10. "I Found Love" – 4:05
11. "Wild Boys" – 3:40
12. "Off the Hook" – 3:17
13. "Turn It Over" – 3:18
14. "Ice Cream" (featuring Taz) – 3:21
15. "Why" (English Version) – 3:27
16. "You Believed" (Slow Piano String Version) – 3:30

== Release history ==
| Region | Date | Format | Label | Catalogue |
|---|---|---|---|---|
| Finland | 30 March 2011 | CD, Digital download | AXR Records | AXR048 |
| Worldwide | 23 November 2011 | CD, Digital download | GlenDisc Records | GlenDisc11203 |
