= A Little Bit (Pandora song) =

1996 single by Pandora

Single by Pandora

from the album Changes
- Released: December 1996
- Genre: Dance; Eurodance; house
- Length: 3:32 (Double M's Radio Edit); 3:28 (radio version)
- Label: EMI; Virgin
- Songwriter(s): Martin Ankelius; Henrik Andersson; Patrik Magnusson
- Producer(s): Huma; Peka P.; Sir Martin

Pandora singles chronology
"One of Us" (1995)	"A Little Bit" (1996)	"Smile 'n' Shine" (1997)

Music video
- "A Little Bit " on YouTube

"A Little Bit" is a song by Swedish singer Pandora. It was released in December 1996 as the lead single from Pandora's third studio album Changes (1996). The song peaked at number 28 on the Swedish Singles Chart. It also reached number three in Finland and number ten in Australia, was certified Platinum and is her highest-charting single there.

== Music video ==
The music video starts out in New York City, as can depicted from the yellow Chevrolet Caprice (9C6) taxi cabs, where Pandora is dressed in a blue flight attendant uniform and guides her dance crew onto a double-decker bus. While on the second deck of the bus, Pandora can be seen standing at the back of the deck and singing on a microphone attached to a stand while talking about the ups and downs of life regarding women's insecurities in life.

== Track listing ==
"A Little Bit" was released in various formats. The major formats include:

#	"A little Bit" (Main)	Time
1.	"A Little Bit" (Single version)	3:28
2.	"A Little Bit" (Double M's Radio Edit)	3:32
3.	"A Little Bit" (The Sir Family House Mix)	5:21
4.	"A Little Bit" ((Rob 'N' Raz Mix))	4:39
5.	"A Little Bit" (Extended Club Mix)	5:32
6.	"A Little Bit" (Xtacy Mix)	7:04
7.	"A Little Bit" (Kontor Dub)	5:29

#	"A Little Bit" (European Version)	Time
1.	"A Little Bit" (Radio Version)	3:28
2.	"A Little Bit" (The Sir Family House Mix)	5:21
3.	"A Little Bit" (Extended Club Mix)	5:32

#	"A Little Bit" (Cardboard Slip Case)	Time
1.	"A Little Bit" (Radio Version)	3:28
2.	"A Little Bit" (Instrumental)	3:28

== Chart performance ==
"A Little Bit" peaked at number 3 in Finland and number 10 in Australia, where it remained in the top 50, for 30 weeks.

=== Weekly charts ===
Chart (1997–1999)	Peak position
Australia (ARIA)	10
Finland (Suomen virallinen lista)	3
Sweden (Sverigetopplistan)	28

=== Year-end charts ===
Chart (1999)	Position
Australia (ARIA)	84

== Certifications ==
Region	Certification	Certified units/sales
Australia (ARIA)	Platinum	70,000^{^}
^{^} Shipments figures based on certification alone.
