= On a Night Like This =

2000 single by Kylie Minogue

Single by Kylie Minogue

from the album Light Years
- B-side: "Ocean Blue"
- Released: 11 September 2000
- Studio: Dreamhouse (London, England)
- Genre: Europop; dance-pop; house
- Length: 3:32
- Label: Mushroom; Parlophone
- Songwriters: Steve Torch; Graham Stack; Mark Taylor; Brian Rawling
- Producers: Graham Stack; Mark Taylor

Kylie Minogue singles chronology
"Spinning Around" (2000)	"On a Night Like This" (2000)	"Kids" (2000)

Music video
- "On a Night Like This" on YouTube

"On a Night Like This" is a song by Australian singer Kylie Minogue. It was released on 11 September 2000 by Parlophone and Mushroom Records as the second single for her seventh studio album, Light Years (2000), and was distributed in various formats. The track was originally recorded by Swedish singer Pandora and written by Steve Torch, Brian Rawling, Graham Stack, and Mark Taylor, while production was handled by the latter two, it was handed to Minogue to record. Musically, "On a Night Like This" is a Europop, dance-pop and house song that also incorporates elements of disco. Its lyrical content delves into experiencing unique, possibly sexual experiences during the night.

Upon its release, "On a Night Like This" received generally favourable reviews from music critics. Some of them complimented the production and its dance sound, whilst some noted that it did not stand out among other tracks from Light Years. Commercially, in Australia and the United Kingdom, the song peaked at number one and number two, respectively. Elsewhere, it reached the top 40 in countries such as Sweden, Ireland, Finland, and New Zealand. An accompanying music video was shot by Douglas Avery, with its plot being inspired by the Martin Scorsese 1995 film Casino.

The song has been performed on all of Minogue's concert tours since its release, with the exception of the Anti Tour. Since its release, it has been selected by contemporary critics as one of her most recognizable and career-defining tracks. "On a Night Like This" was re-distributed as an orchestral version for her 2012 compilation album, The Abbey Road Sessions.

== Background and release ==
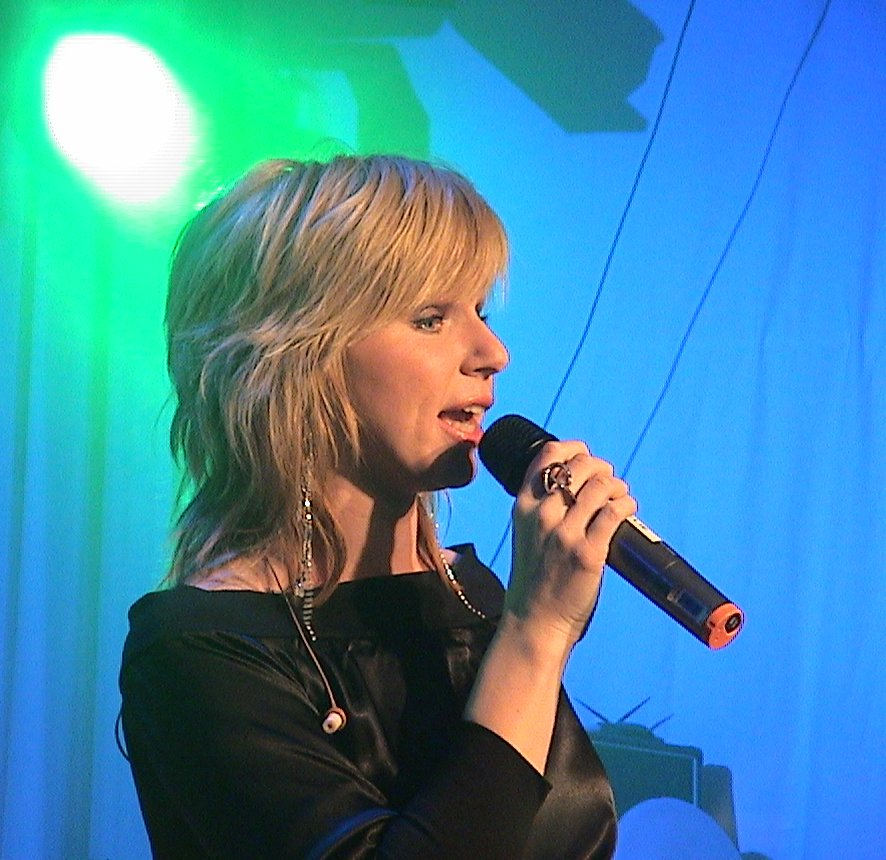
Swedish singer Pandora (pictured) initially recorded the single in 1999, but its rejection resulted in Minogue and Anna Vissi re-recording it.

After leaving her label Deconstruction Records in 1998, Minogue signed a deal with British label Parlophone that same year and began recording her album Light Years (2000). The following year, she released her comeback single, "Spinning Around", which garnered critical and commercial success in Australasia and Europe, and led to her releasing a follow-up single from Light Years. "On a Night Like This" was originally written for Swedish recording artist Pandora by Steve Torch, Brian Rawling, Graham Stack, and Mark Taylor, with production being handled by the latter two. Pandora recorded it for her 1999 album, No Regrets, but its composers believed the result to not gain as much success as they had hoped. As a result, they handed the recording to Parlophone and suggested Minogue to record her vocals over the backing track, which she did. Greek Cypriot recording artist Anna Vissi had also obtained rights to record the track, and her version appeared on her studio album Everything I Am (2000); both Pandora's and Minogue's version feature the same instrumental basis, while Vissi's had a significantly different production.

"On a Night Like This" was released on 11 September 2000 by Parlophone as the second single Light Years and was distributed in various formats. In Australia and New Zealand, where Mushroom Records issued the single, the first CD features the original recording, three remixes of the song and the enhanced music video, while the second CD includes the original mix of "On a Night Like This", one remix of the song, a remix of her single "Your Disco Needs You", and the B-side track "Ocean Blue". The British and European physical editions have a similar track list but omit one remix from each format. A cardboard sleeve was issued only in France, including "On a Night Like This" and "Ocean Blue", while the Australian and New Zealand formats were re-released in Taiwan by EMI Music.

Near the end of 2000, record label Dance Factory distributed the single as a 12-inch vinyl that included the original track list from the first Australian and New Zealand CD single, while two vinyl discs were released in the United Kingdom. The final format was a cassette tape distributed in Europe; it included the single and two remixes on both sides. An accompanying cover sleeve was shot by Vincent Peters in Ibiza, and features Minogue laying down on a marble surface in front of a sea front; the shot also appeared in the booklet of Light Years. According to Minogue, she believed it intertwined with the message of "sunshine, beach, fun, glamour", a concept she wanted to experiment with on the parent album. British fashion designer and friend of Minogue William Baker felt the image was of a "mystical quality".

== Composition and lyrics ==
Musically, "On a Night Like This" is a Europop, dance-pop and house song that incorporates elements of disco in its instrumentation. Minogue recorded the track at Dreamhouse Studios in London, United Kingdom during early 2000, and it was mixed by Mark Taylor and Graham Stack. A staff member of Pandora Radio commented the recording's instrumentation as consisting of string sections, acoustic guitars, keyboards and synthesisers managed by Taylor and Stack; the pre-chorus and chorus sections feature background vocals. According to the sheet music published by Universal Music, the song is written in the key of C minor and is set in time signature of common time with a tempo of 130 beats per minute. Minogue's vocals span from B♭3 to C5, whilst the recording has a sequence of Cm-B♭-Fm7-B♭-Cm-B♭-FM7-B♭-Cm-B♭/C-Fm7/C-B♭/C in the verses, and Cm-B♭/C-A♭-B♭ in the chorus as its chord progression. Lyrically, "On a Night Like This" focuses on a person enjoying unique experiences on night time, but also approaches themes of relationships and love. According to New Zealand Herald's Scott Kara, the composition is "a swirling, late night club pop tune." A reviewer from British tabloid NME compared the "disco" sound to the 2000 track "Groovejet (If This Ain't Love)" by Spiller, and to the work of English recording artist Sophie Ellis-Bextor.

== Critical reception ==
"On a Night Like This" received generally favourable reviews from most music critics. Writing for Stylus Magazine, Mark Edwards said that the recording was one of the singer's songs from Ultimate Kylie that "cemented her comeback". He referred it to as a "mega-song". Similarly, Jason Shawahn from About.com noted it as "a blessing for domestic music consumers". AllMusic's Chris True favored "On a Night Like This" as one of the better cuts on the parent album, and selected the track as some of Minogue's best work. Nick Levine from Digital Spy called it a "catchy" number, and pointed it out as a highlight from the record. While likening the recording to the track "Groovejet" by Spiller and Sophie Ellis-Bextor, a reviewer from British tabloid NME felt the comparison "works because it doesn't revolve awkwardly round a random disco beat".

In a review of Minogue's greatest hits album, The Best of Kylie Minogue (2012) by PopMatters' Matt James, he described "On a Night Like This" as a "bedroom-eyed nightclubber", further adding it was "still hot enough to melt large glaciers." Billboard's Jason Lipshutz felt it was "more propulsive, with an even more enjoyable bridge" than previous single "Spinning Around". Guillermo Alonso, from the Spanish edition of Vanity Fair, wrote: "paying homage to the different sounds of the decades she had already lived through. ["On a Night Like This"] was this huge song that drank from 90s Europop, filled with a euphoric chorus and sensual whispers". On a more mixed note, NME's Stevie Chick believed that Minogue lacked genuine "passion" throughout the song and labelled it "unremarkable". Similarly, Hunter Felt from PopMatters enjoyed the song, but felt disappointed by Parlophone and the public for not releasing the single in the United States, commenting "'On a Night Like This', a track that is meant to go right to number one on the Billboard Club Tracks list and while being completely ignored by the general public."

== Chart performance ==
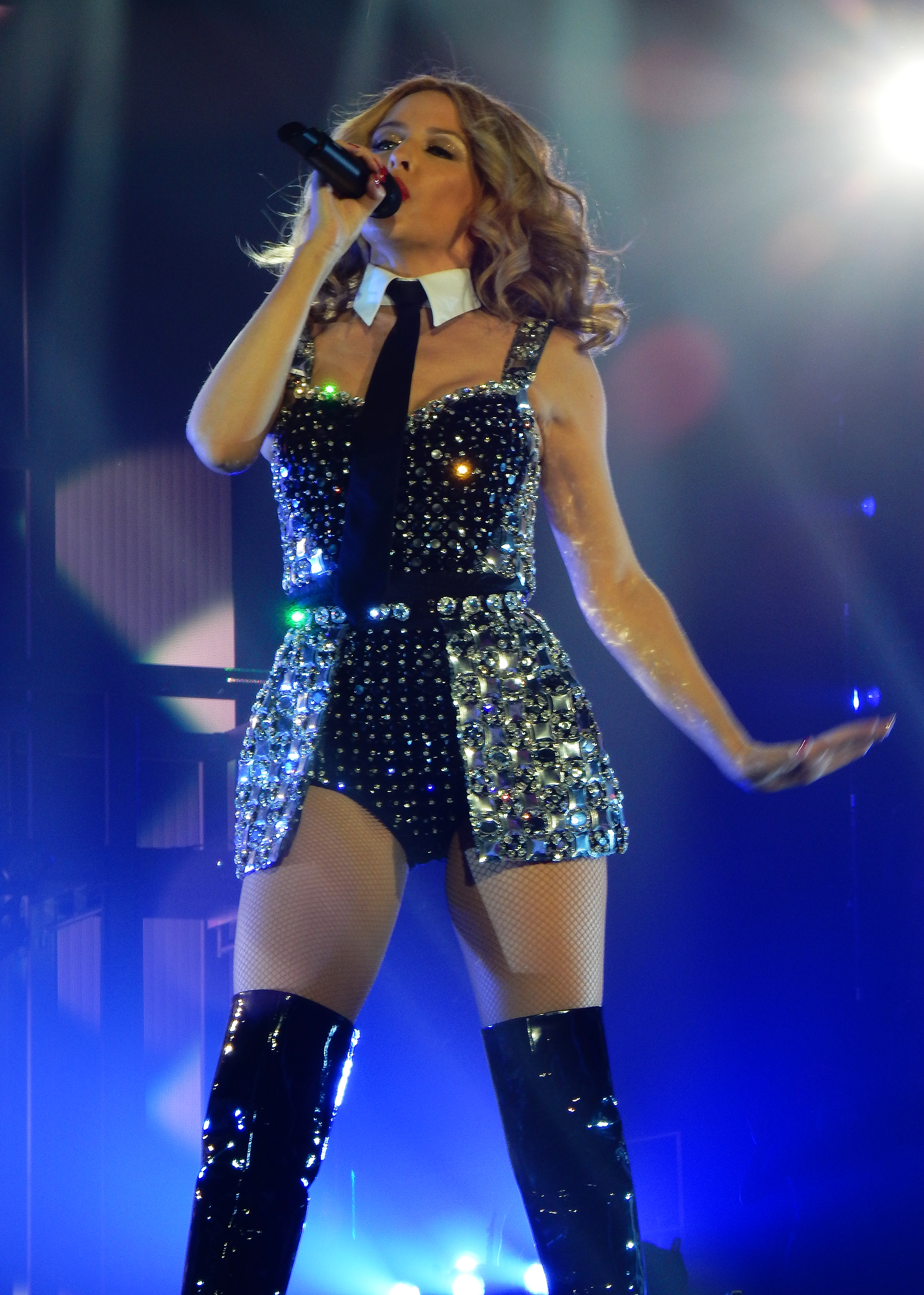
Minogue singing "On a Night Like This" during her Kiss Me Once Tour in 2014

Commercially, the single experienced success in Australia and the United Kingdom. It debuted at number one on the Australian Singles Chart, making it her sixth number-one in that region; it also gave her the record for having the most singles debuting at number one with five entries. Subsequently, "On a Night Like This" fell to number three and number five in its second and third week, respectively, giving Minogue the distinction of having the lowest week drops for a single debuting atop the chart. "On a Night Like This" topped the chart during its fourth week in and spent an overall 17 weeks in the top 50, one of Minogue's longest-spanning releases in that region. It was certified Platinum by the Australian Recording Industry Association (ARIA) for physical shipments of 70,000 units. On the UK Singles Chart, the single debuted at number two, having been stalled from the top position by the song "Lady (Hear Me Tonight)" by French duo Modjo. It descended outside the top ten the following week, had three non-consecutive chart runs, and lasted 13 weeks inside the top 100. As of March 2014, "On a Night Like This" had sold 170,000 units in that region, as confirmed by the Official Charts Company. Elsewhere, it reached number two on the Scottish Singles Chart and number 16 on the Irish Singles Chart.

The single performed moderately around Europe and Australasia. "On a Night Like This" entered at number 39 on the New Zealand Singles Chart, and reached its peak position at 34 the following week; this resulted in marking one of Minogue's lowest-charting singles in that region, with it spending a total of nine weeks within the top 50. "On a Night Like This" further reached number 69 on the French Singles Chart and remained for a total of five weeks inside the chart. It had a similar chart run in the Netherlands, where it peaked at number 64 and lasted four weeks. The track additionally reached the top 40 in both Sweden and Finland, whilst in the latter it only lasted a sole week in the top 20, and managed to enter the top 70 and 50 in both Germany and Switzerland. The single fared slightly better in Belgium's Flanders and Wallonia, where it peaked at number 29 on the former chart and at number three on the Bubbling Under chart in Wallonia, thus failing to enter the region's official charts.

== Music video ==
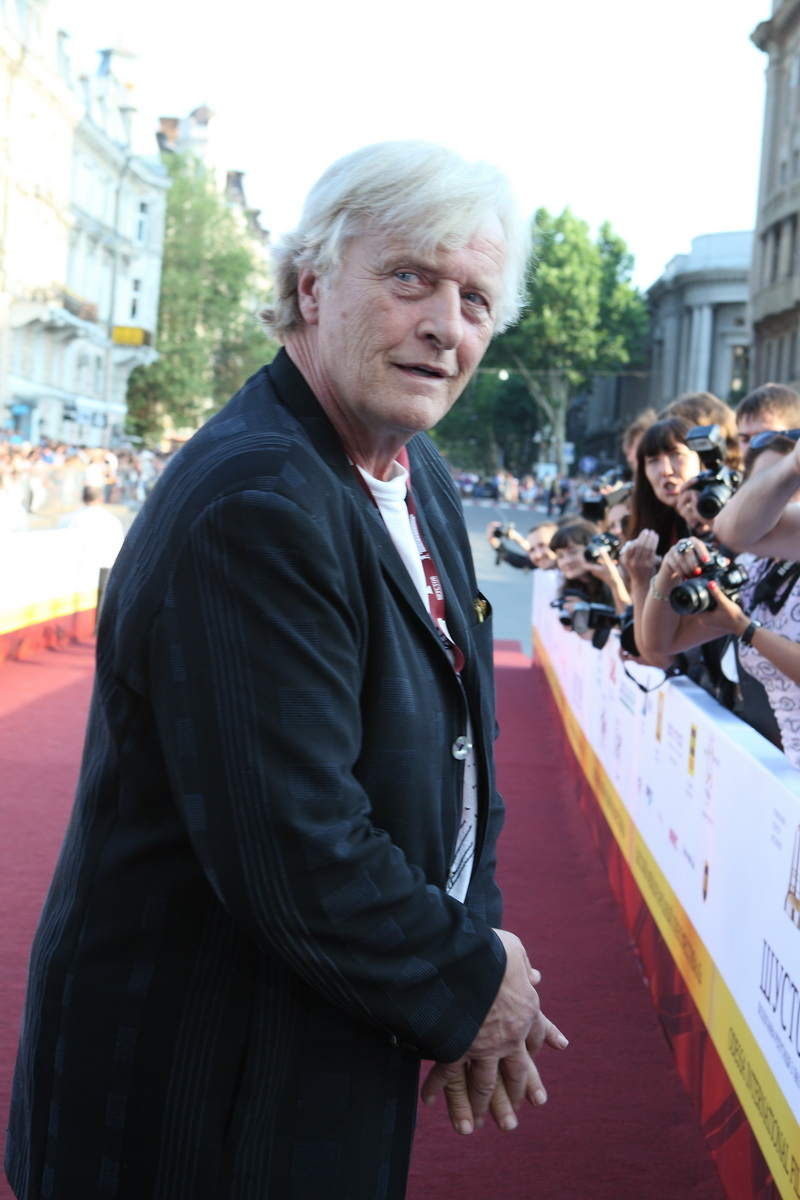
Minogue played Rutger Hauer's (pictured) mistress in the music video.

An accompanying music video was directed by Douglas Avery, and was filmed in Monte Carlo in July 2000. The plot was loosely based on Martin Scorsese's 1995 crime drama movie Casino, with Minogue herself portraying a character using aspects of Sharon Stone's bored trophy wife. Dutch actor Rutger Hauer served as Minogue's on-screen mob partner and husband. According to Hauer, no one from the set—including the singer, and apart from Avery—knew he was appearing as a cameo. Regarding the on-screen relationship, the singer stated; "In my opinion, the Rutger Hauer character is kind of like a minder or he's in charge of her, although there is that kind of strong sexual tension." The artist wore three outfits in the video—a multi-coloured dress by Versace at the start of the visual, a black dress during her appearance at a casino in Monte Carlo, and a final blue cocktail dress by Roland Mouret. She had sported an estimated $2 million worth of jewellery and diamonds during filming, with a few security guards having to accompany her on the set.

The music video opens with a group of mob members plotting a scheme whilst Hauer is seen drinking an unspecified alcohol. Subsequently, the song starts and Minogue is seen on a diving board, jumping into a pool, presumably dead. Mob members look towards her body in distance, but then look away towards Hauer. She starts singing the track in the pool, gets out of it, and walks towards the mob members who seem disinterested of her presence. The singer undresses herself and throws the dress out of the window, which captures their attention. She subsequently drives in a limousine and puts on accessories whilst the driver takes her to the Monte Carlo Casino. The artist enters the casino, and plays poker with several members, eventually winning. Minogue appears in the limousine again, sporting the blue cocktail dress. Hauer, who is by himself at home, hears Minogue walking into the apartment, but she pushes over a large green vase and smashes it; disinterested, he looks towards in distance. The final scene has Minogue undressing herself and walking down steps.

British author Sean Smith, who wrote a biography about Minogue, described the video and scenery as "broody" and "atmospheric." According to Smith, an original version had shown footage of her both full-frontal and back nude. NME had reportedly published an article regarding the nude scene, but Avery stated that no nude shots were ever created.

== Promotion ==
=== Live performances and other usage ===
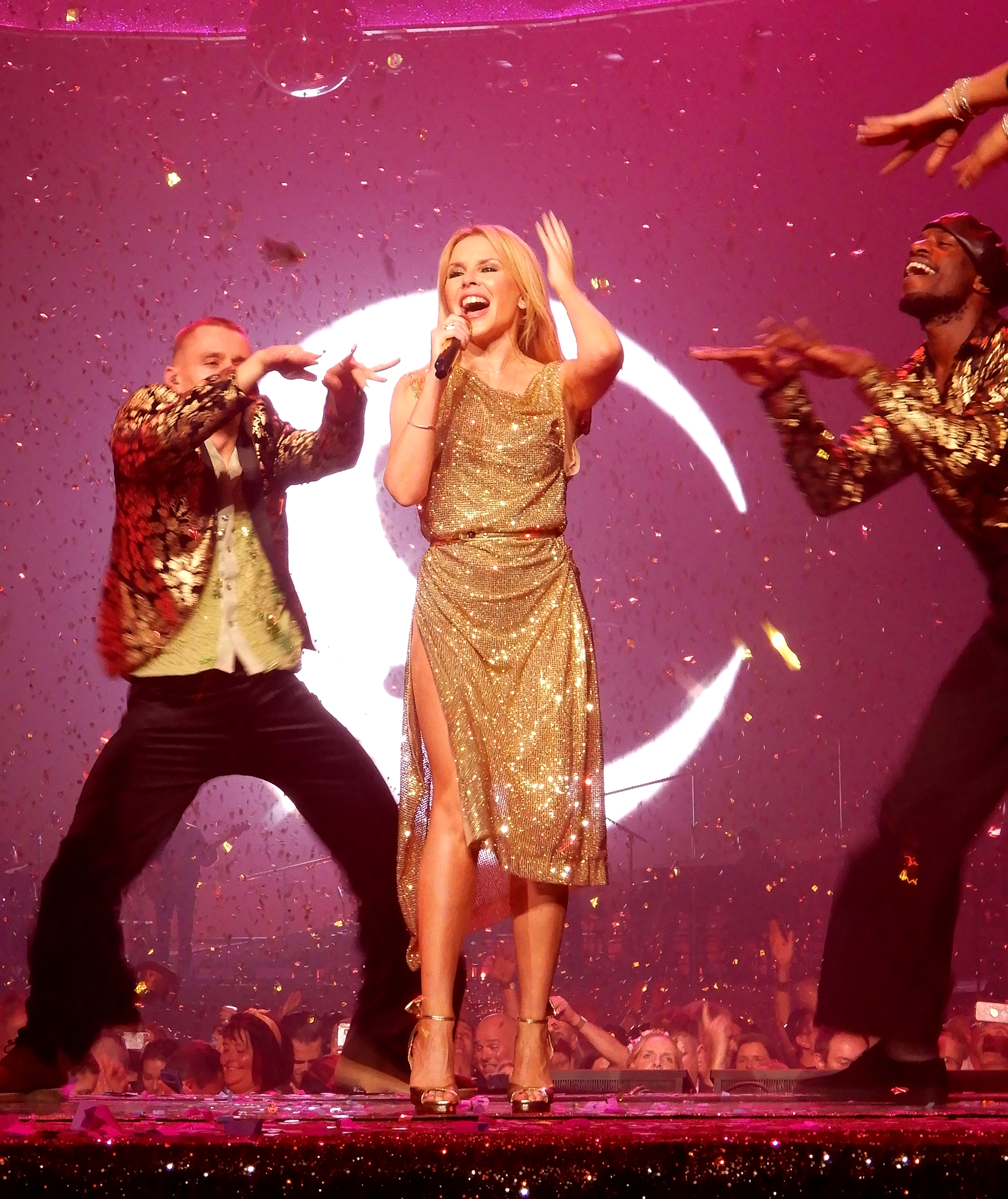
Minogue performing a medley of "New York City", "Raining Glitter" and "On a Night Like This" during the Golden Tour (2018–19)

On 22 September 2000, Minogue performed the recording live for the first time on Top of the Pops, wearing the same pink and beige dress from the music video. At the 2000 Sydney Olympics closing ceremony, Minogue performed ABBA's "Dancing Queen" and "On a Night Like This". In November 2012, the singer performed the song as part of the Royal Variety Performance at the Royal Albert Hall. Since its release, "On a Night Like This" has been featured on nearly all of Minogue's concert tours, except the Anti Tour and For You, for Me North American tour. It was one of the headlining songs of the On a Night Like This Tour, which was launched to promote Light Years in 2001. Minogue had been lowered from an anchor up until performing the song. The single was additionally performed during the "Sex in Venice" act of the KylieFever2002 tour, and in 2005 on her Showgirl: The Greatest Hits Tour. Minogue was unable to complete the tour as she was diagnosed with early breast cancer and had to cancel the Australian leg of the tour.

After undergoing treatment and recovery, she resumed the concert tour in the form of Showgirl: The Homecoming Tour in 2007, and performed "On a Night Like This" on the "Homecoming" segment. The song was performed as part of the "Black Versus White" act of the KylieX2008 tour. Minogue performed "On a Night Like This" during her Aphrodite: Les Folies Tour in 2011, which contained elements of DJ Sammy's single "Heaven". In December 2012, she performed the song on the Nobel Peace Prize Concert. "On a Night Like This" was also included on 2014's Kiss Me Once Tour, where it was performed "amid a kaleidoscope of lasers". It was also performed on Minogue's 2015 Summer Tour, which featured her in a glittery black and white dress. For 2018's Golden Tour, "On a Night Like This" was performed in a medley with unreleased track "New York City" and "Raining Glitter", a song from her fourteenth studio album Golden; it was performed in a Studio 54 setting and found Minogue, dressed in a sparkly golden dress, surrounded by dancers. Minogue also performed the song at her 2025 Tension Tour, with it being preceded by an interlude featuring the song ''Taboo'' from her seventeenth studio album Tension II. Minogue promoted the song by appearing in a Pepsi commercial, having the track as background music; it was included on the official soundtrack for 2001, and was singled out by the AllMusic staff as one of the best tracks. It has appeared on four of Minogue's greatest hits compilation albums: Ultimate Kylie (2004), Hits (2011), The Best of Kylie Minogue (2012) and most recently on Step Back in Time: The Definitive Collection (2019). It has appeared on one of Minogue's remix albums, this being Boombox (2008), which was remixed by Italian DJs Bini & Martini.

=== The Abbey Road Sessions version ===
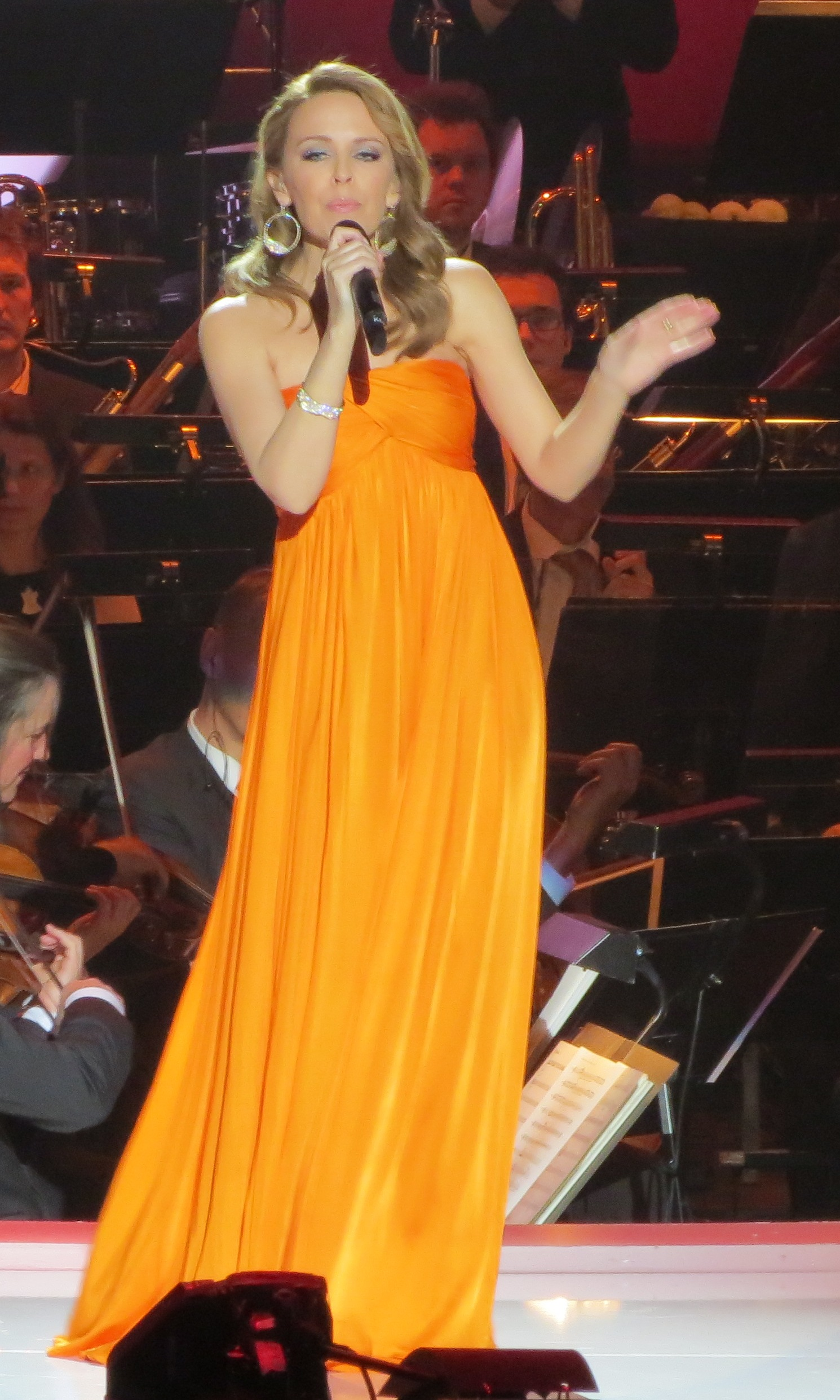
Minogue performs the song during the 2012 Nobel Peace Prize Concert

On 24 February 2012, Minogue uploaded an orchestral version of "On a Night Like This" on her official YouTube channel. It was released three months after Minogue announced a new album that focused on re-worked versions of her previous singles, commenting, "I've been at Abbey Road for about two weeks in total." The song was confirmed in September 2012 to appear on her orchestral compilation album The Abbey Road Sessions as the second track on the album, and was globally released on 24 October 2012. Alongside "On a Night Like This", the album was part of a commemoration of Minogue's 25th career anniversary that spanned through the entire 2012. Annie Zaleski from The A.V. Club described the composition as a "brassy R&B torch song thanks to a soaring gospel choir and dramatic strings [...]". Writing for The Guardian, Caroline Sullivan noted the track to "[transform] the teenage-crush fervour of the original into a cool, big-band seduction". To promote the track, Minogue's label Parlophone distributed a CD single in the United Kingdom on 17 December 2012, which featured the re-worked recording and its instrumental version.

Reaction towards the re-worked version of "On a Night Like This" was positive amongst music critics. Scott Kara from the New Zealand Herald highlighted the track as one of the two standouts on the album, and praised its composition; he called it a "sweeping and grand serenade". Similarly, Digital Spy's Robert Copsey selected the track as one of the better cuts and commended how the orchestral quality allowed to emphasise the lyrical content more than the original. Jeff Katz from the American music website Idolator was very positive, stating "Many of the cuts—including 'On A Night Like This,' 'Finer Feelings' and 'Confide in Me' — sound ready for placement in a Bond film. Driving drums and suspenseful strings breathe new life into the old favorites." Philip Matusavage from MusicOMH enjoyed the "re-invented" and "advertous" track, and selected it as a "confident" highlight from the album. To promote the single, Minogue performed the orchestral version as part of the BBC Proms in the Park London 2012 in December.

== Track listings ==
- Australian CD1 and European CD2
1. "On a Night Like This" – 3:34
2. "On a Night Like This" (Rob Searle mix) – 7:58
3. "On a Night Like This" (Bini & Martini mix) – 6:35
4. "On a Night Like This" (Motiv 8 Nocturnal vocal mix) – 7:32
5. "On a Night Like This" (video)
- Australian CD2
1. "On a Night Like This" – 3:34
2. "On a Night Like This" (Halo mix) – 8:06
3. "Ocean Blue" – 4:22
4. "Your Disco Needs You" (Almighty remix) – 8:20
- UK CD1
1. "On a Night Like This" – 3:34
2. "Ocean Blue" – 4:22
3. "Your Disco Needs You" (Almighty remix) – 8:20
4. "On a Night Like This" (video)
- UK CD2
1. "On a Night Like This" – 3:34
2. "On a Night Like This" (Rob Searle mix) – 7:58
3. "On a Night Like This" (Motiv 8 Nocturnal vocal mix) – 7:32
- UK 12-inch single
1. "On a Night Like This" (Rob Searle mix) – 7:58
2. "On a Night Like This" (Bini & Martini mix) – 6:35
3. "On a Night Like This" (Halo mix) – 8:06
- European CD1
1. "On a Night Like This" – 3:34
2. "Ocean Blue" – 4:22
3. "On a Night Like This" (video)
- Digital download (2005)
1. "On a Night Like This" (Bini & Martini dub mix) – 6:33
2. "On a Night Like This" (Halo mix) – 8:03
3. "On a Night Like This" (live at Manchester Arena, 4 May 2002) – 3:54
4. "On a Night Like This" (Motiv 8 Nocturnal vocal mix) – 7:31

== Credits and personnel ==
Credits are adapted from liner notes of Light Years.

Recording

- Recorded at Dreamhouse Studios, London, United Kingdom.

Credits

- Kylie Minogue – vocals, background vocals
- Steve Torch – songwriting
- Graham Stack – songwriting, composing, production, arrangement, mixing
- Mark Taylor – songwriting, composing, production, arrangement, mixing
- Brian Rawling – songwriting, composing
- Douglas Avery – music video director
- Rob Erye – programming
- Terry Blamey – management
- Vincent Peters – photography
- Rob Searle – remixer
- Bini & Martini – remixer
- Motiv 8 – remixer

== Charts ==
=== Weekly charts ===
Weekly chart performance for "On a Night Like This"
Chart (2000)	Peak position
Australia (ARIA)	1
Australian Dance (ARIA)	1
Belgium (Ultratop 50 Flanders)	29
Belgium (Ultratip Bubbling Under Wallonia)	3
Croatia International Airplay (HRT)	4
Europe (Eurochart Hot 100)	11
Finland (Suomen virallinen lista)	20
France (SNEP)	69
Germany (Official German Charts)	72
Hungary (Mahasz)	4
Iceland (Íslenski Listinn Topp 40)	2
Ireland (IRMA)	16
Ireland Dance (IRMA)	4
Netherlands (Singles Top 100)	64
New Zealand (Recorded Music NZ)	34
Poland Airplay (Music & Media)	16
Romania (Romanian Top 100)	9
Russia Airplay (InterMedia)	11
Scottish Singles Sales (Official Charts)	2
Singapore (SPVA)	1
Sweden (Sverigetopplistan)	31
Switzerland (Schweizer Hitparade)	51
UK Singles (Official Charts)	2

=== Year-end charts ===
Year-end chart performance for "On a Night Like This"
Chart (2000)	Position
Australia (ARIA)	27
Europe (European Hit Radio)	90
Iceland (Íslenski Listinn Topp 40)	97
Romania (Romanian Top 100)	85
UK Singles (OCC)	129

== Certifications and sales ==
Certifications and sales for "On a Night Like This"
Region	Certification	Certified units/sales
Australia (ARIA)	Platinum	70,000^{^}
United Kingdom (BPI)	Silver	170,000
^{^} Shipments figures based on certification alone.

== United DJs vs. Pandora remix ==
"On a Night Like This"

Single by United DJs vs Pandora

from the album Celebration
- Released: November 2007
- Length: 3:14
- Label: Capitol
- Songwriters: Steve Torch; Graham Stack; Mark Taylor; Brian Rawling

United DJs vs Pandora singles chronology
"Tell the World" (2007)	"On a Night Like This" (2007)	"Call Me" (2008)

"On a Night Like This" was recorded by United DJs vs Pandora and released in November 2007 as the fourth and final single from United DJs vs. Pandora's album, Celebration (2007). The song peaked at number three on the Swedish Singles Chart.

=== Track listing ===
1. "On a Night Like This" (JS16 Radio Edit) – 3:14
2. "On a Night Like This" (JS16 L8 Nite Radio Edit) – 6:10
3. "On a Night Like This" (Playmaker's Mix) – 3:41

=== Charts ===
Weekly chart performance for "On a Night Like This"
Chart (2007–2008)	Peak position
Sweden (Sverigetopplistan)	3
