= This Could Be Heaven (album) =

Studio album by Pandora
- Released: 8 December 1997
- Recorded: 1997
- Studio: Hit Vision Studios, PAD Studios, Canada; Dreamhouse Studios
- Genre: Electronic; Dance-pop
- Label: Universal Music / EMI Music
- Producer: Sir Martin; Huma; Peka P.; Mats Nyman; Brian Rawling; Mark Taylor; Paul Barry

Pandora chronology
Best of Pandora (1997)	This Could Be Heaven (1997)	Pandora's Hit Box (1998)

Singles from This Could Be Heaven
- 1. "Single Life" Released: 1997; 2. "Show Me What You Got" Released: 1997; 3. "Spirit to Win" Released: 6 March 1998; 4. "This Could Be Heaven" Released: 1998; 5. "You Drive Me Crazy" Released: May 1998; 6. "Mr Right" Released: 1998

This Could Be Heaven is the fourth studio album by Swedish singer Pandora. It was released in December 1997 by Universal Records. The album peaked at number 19 in Finland.

The album was re-released in Sweden in 1998 and included the bonus track "Spirit to Win" which was recorded as the official track of the 1998 Winter Olympics in Nagano, Japan.

== Track listing ==
1. "Single Life" (Mark Taylor, Paul Colgate) – 3:36
2. "Everybody's Livin' It Up" (Taylor, Paul Barry, Steve Torch) – 4:10
3. "Shout It Out" (featuring Martin Carboo) (Hendrik Andersson, Martin Ankelius, Peter Johansson) – 3:16
4. "Show Me What You Got" (featuring Patrick Ntumba) (Martin Ankelius, Peter Johansson) – 3:22
5. "Great Life" (Mats Nyman, Pandora) – 3:54
6. "If This Isn't Love (What Is It)" (Nyman, Pandora) – 4:20
7. "This Could Be Heaven" (Taylor, Barry) – 3:55
8. "Let It Go" (Andersson, Ankelius, Johansson) – 3:02
9. "(You'll Always Be) The Love of My Life" (Taylor, Barry) – 4:00
10. "Mr. Right" (Andersson, Johansson) – 3:32
11. "I'll Be There for You" (Andersson, Ankelius, Johansson) – 4:32
12. "I Welcome You" (Nyman, Pandora) – 3:43
13. "You Drive Me Crazy" (featuring Martin Carboo) (Andersson, Johansson) – 3:15
14. "I Feel Free" (Graham Stack, Taylor, Barry) – 3:38
15. "Spirit To Win" (Klaus Maria Weigurt, Enrico Joseph) – 3:09 (1998 bonus track)

== Charts ==
Chart (1997/98)	Peak position
Finnish Albums (Suomen virallinen lista)	19

== Certifications ==
Region	Certification	Certified units/sales
Japan (RIAJ)	Platinum	200,000^{^}
^{^} Shipments figures based on certification alone.

== Release history ==
Region	Date	Format	Label	Catalogue
Japan	8 December 1997	CD, Cassette	Universal	MVCE-24067
Scandinavia	December 1997	CD, Cassette	EMI Records	7243 4 95034 2 7
Sweden	1998	CD, Cassette	EMI Records	
