= Smile 'n' Shine =

Single by Pandora

from the album Changes
- Released: April 1997
- Recorded: 1996
- Studio: Dreamhouse Studios, London
- Genre: Dance; Eurodance; house
- Length: 3:25
- Label: Universal Music
- Songwriter(s): Martin Ankelius; Peter Johansson
- Producer(s): Huma; Peka P.; Sir Martin

Pandora singles chronology
"A Little Bit" (1996)	"Smile 'n' Shine" (1997)	"The Sands of Time" (1997)

"Smile 'n' Shine" is a song by Swedish artist Pandora. It was released in April 1997 as the second single from Pandora's third studio album Changes (1996). The song peaked at number 45 on the Swedish Singles Chart.

== Track listing ==
- CD Single
1. "Smile N Shine" (UK Radio Mix) - 3:25
2. "Smile N Shine" (UK 12" Mix) - 4:46
- CD Maxi
1. "Smile N Shine" (UK Radio Mix) - 3:25
2. "Smile N Shine" (United Nations Mix) - 6:50
3. "Smile N Shine" (UK 12" Mix) - 4:46
4. "Smile N Shine" (United Nations Dub) - 7:33
- Australian CD Maxi
1. "Smile N Shine" (UK Radio Mix) - 3:25
2. "Smile N Shine" (United Nations Mix) - 6:50
3. "Smile N Shine" (UK 12" Mix) - 4:46
4. "Smile N Shine" (United Nations Dub) - 7:33
5. "Smile N Shine" (Triad Mix) - 8:59
6. "You'll Always Be The Love of My Life" (Original Version) - 4:00
7. "You'll Always Be The Love of My Life" (Club Mix) - 5:32

== Charts ==
Chart (1997–1999)	Peak position
Australia (ARIA)	17
Finland (Suomen virallinen lista)	15
Sweden (Sverigetopplistan)	45
