= Won't Look Back (album) =

Studio album by Pandora
- Released: February 2002
- Genre: Europop pop
- Length: 45:04
- Label: Mariann Records, EMI Music

Pandora chronology
A Little Closer (2001)	Won't Look Back (2002)	9 Lives (2003)

Singles from I Won't Look Back
- 1. "I Won't Look Back" Released: 2002; 2. "When I'm Over You" Released: 2002

Won't Look Back is the eighth studio album by Swedish singer Pandora, released in Finland in February 2002 and Internationally in February 2003. The album peaked at number 40 on the Finnish Charts, becoming Pandora's fourth top forty album in Finland, and first since This Could Be Heaven in 1998.

== Track listing ==
1. "I Won't Look Back" – 3:43
2. "Don't Worry" – 3:41
3. "I Found Love" – 4:06
4. "Every Second Beat" (featuring Eric Martin) – 3:28
5. "Come a Little Closer" – 4:27
6. "When I'm Over You" – 3:40
7. "Crazy Way About You" – 3:45
8. "I Need to Know" – 3:37
9. "Nature of Love" – 3:48
10. "Believe in Me" – 3:48
11. "Anyway" – 3:48
12. "I'm the Better Woman" – 3:09
- NB: "Don't Worry", "I Found Love", "Every Second Beat", "Come a Little Closer", "I Need to Know", "Believe in Me" and "Anyway" were on Pandora's previous studio album, A Little Closer.

== Charts ==
Chart (2002)	Peak position
Finnish Albums (Suomen virallinen lista)	40

== Release history ==
Region	Date	Format	Label	Catalogue
Finland	February 2002	CD, Digital download	EMI Finland, Westridge Music	0 7243 536368 2 1
Worldwide	23 February 2003	Digital download	OY EMI Finland	
