= Something's Gone =

1994 single by Pandora

Single by Pandora

from the album One of a Kind
- Released: May 1994
- Length: 4:21
- Label: Virgin
- Songwriter(s): Henrik Andersson; Martin Akelius; Peter Johansson
- Producer(s): Sir Martin

Pandora singles chronology
"One of a Kind" (1994)	"Something's Gone" (1994)	"Tell the World" (1994)

"Something's Gone" is a song by Swedish singer Pandora. It was released in May 1994 as the fourth and final single from her debut studio album One of a Kind (1993). It features an uncredited rap by K-Slim. The song peaked at number 18 on the Swedish Singles Chart.

== Track listings ==
- CD single
1. "Something's Gone" (Ragga Dance Cut) – 4:21
2. "Something's Gone" (album version) – 4:46
- Maxi-CD single
1. "Something's Gone" (Ragga Dance Cut) – 4:21
2. "Something's Gone" (album version) – 4:46
3. "Something's Gone" (Orbital Trance edit) – 3:43
4. "Something's Gone" (Heavenly edit) – 5:22

== Charts ==
Chart (1994)	Peak position
Iceland (Íslenski Listinn Topp 40)	24
Sweden (Sverigetopplistan)	18
