= Changes (Pandora album) =

Studio album by Pandora
- Released: 16 December 1996
- Recorded: 1996
- Studio: Hit Vision Studios, PAD Studios, Canada
- Genre: Electronic; dance; Eurodance; house; Hi NRG; pop
- Label: MCA Records; Universal Music
- Producer: Sir Martin; Huma; Peka P.

Pandora chronology
Tell the World (1995)	Changes (1996)	Best of Pandora (1997)

Singles from Changes
- 1. "A Little Bit" Released: December 1996; 2. "Smile 'n' Shine" Released: April 1997; 3. "The Sands of Time" Released: 1997

Changes is the third studio album by Swedish singer Pandora. It was released in December 1996 by MCA Records. The album peaked at number 29 in Sweden.

== Track listing ==
1. "Prologue: Echoes" (Henrik Andersson) – 0:45
2. "It's Alright" (Martin Ankelius, Peter Johansson) – 3:59
3. "A Little Bit" (Andersson, Ankelius, Pandora) – 3:29
4. "The Sands of Time" (Ankelius, Johansson) – 3:47
5. "Anything" (Ankelius, Johansson) – 3:56
6. "Why" (Andersson, Ankelius, Pandora) – 4:43
7. "Any Time Of Season" (featuring G. Cole) (Ankelius, Johansson) – 3:19
8. "Smile 'n' Shine" (Ankelius, Johansson) – 3:43
9. "If You Want It (Come and Get It)" (Andersson, Johansson) – 3:49
10. "Goin' On" (Andersson, Johansson) – 3:26
11. "Love and Glory" (Kee Marcello, Mats Nyman, Pandora) – 4:02
12. "Waves of Memories (Epilogue)" (Andersson, Johansson) – 4:45
13. "A Little Bit" (Double M's Radio Edit-Short) – 3:32 (international bonus track)

== Charts ==
Chart (1997)	Peak position
Finnish Albums (Suomen virallinen lista)	4
Swedish Albums (Sverigetopplistan)	29

== Certifications ==
Region	Certification	Certified units/sales
Japan (RIAJ)	Platinum	200,000^{^}
^{^} Shipments figures based on certification alone.

== Release history ==
Region	Date	Format	Label	Catalogue
Japan	16 December 1996	CD, Cassette	MCA Records	MVCZ-117
Sweden/ Finland	December 1996	CD, Cassette	MCA Records	7243 8 557952 3
Australia	1998	CD, Cassette	Universal Music Australia	UMD 70103
