= Trust Me (Pandora song) =

1993 song by Pandora

Single by Pandora

from the album One of a Kind
- B-side: "Remix"
- Released: October 1993
- Recorded: June 1993
- Studio: Stocksund, Stockholm, Sweden
- Genre: Eurodance; house
- Length: 3:26
- Label: Virgin
- Songwriters: Tervald Andersson; Martin Akelius; Peter Johansson
- Producer: Dr. Maxx Family

Pandora singles chronology
"Trust Me" (1993)	"Come On And Do It" (1993)

Music video
- "Trust Me" on YouTube

"Trust Me" is a song by Swedish singer Pandora, released in October 1993 by Virgin Records as the first single from her debut album, One of a Kind (1993). The song is written and produced by Sir Martin & The Dr. Maxx Family, and also features an uncredited rap by rapper K-Slim. On the Swedish Singles Chart, it peaked at number three and was certified gold, as the most sold single of the year in Sweden. Additionally, "Trust Me" was a top-10 hit also in Denmark, Finland, Israel and Norway.

In September 2006, a remix of the song was released by United DJ's vs. Pandora, peaking at number two in Sweden.

== Background and release ==
Singer Anneli Magnusson from Västerås, Sweden was asked to record some demos she’d been singing in a small studio in her hometown. These demos ended up at EMI Sweden’s office. In the autumn of 1993 she signed a contract with the record company and released "Trust Me" under the name Pandora.

== Critical reception ==
Swedish Aftonbladet stated that the song "is certainly an irresistible hit". Billboard magazine described it as a "upbeat and direct" track. A reviewer from Music & Media wrote, "Out of the Swedish box of Pandora rolls a pop/dance song as direct and catchy as Sabrina's 'Boys (Summertime Love)'. Oh Boy, a hit!"

== Chart performance ==
"Trust Me" was successful on the charts in several countries in Europe, particularly in Scandinavia. It peaked at number three in the singer's native Sweden on 17 November 1993, behind "I'd Do Anything for Love (But I Won't Do That)" by Meat Loaf and "Please Forgive Me" by Bryan Adams. The single debuted on Sverigetopplistan at number 31, peaking seven weeks later. It spent a total of 21 weeks within the chart, earning a gold record for becoming the most sold single of the year in Sweden. In Finland, "Trust Me" reached its highest chart position, as number two. In Norway, it peaked at number eight on VG-lista, while in Denmark, it peaked at number ten. On the European Hot 100 Singles, "Trust Me" peaked at number 28 in its fifth week on the chart, on 4 December 1993. It debuted at the chart at number 74, after charting in Sweden. Outside Europe, the song was a huge hit in Israel, reaching number five. It also charted in Australia, peaking at number 82 on the ARIA Top 50 singles chart.

== Track listing ==
- CD single
1. "Trust Me" (Radio Edit) – 3:26
2. "Trust Me" (Club Extended) – 5:34
- CD maxi / 12"
1. "Trust Me" (Radio Edit) – 3:26
2. "Trust Me" (Club Extended) – 5:34
3. "Trust Me" (Club Extended Deep) – 8:01

== Charts ==
=== Weekly charts ===
Weekly chart performance for "Trust Me"
Chart (1993–1994)	Peak position
Australia (ARIA)	82
Denmark (Tracklisten)	10
Europe (Eurochart Hot 100)	28
Finland (Suomen virallinen lista)	2
Israel (Israeli Singles Chart)	5
Norway (VG-lista)	8
Sweden (Sverigetopplistan)	3

=== Year-end charts ===
Year-end chart performance for "Trust Me"
Chart (1993)	Position
Sweden (Topplistan)	11

== Certifications ==
Certifications for "Trust Me"
Region	Certification	Certified units/sales
Sweden (GLF)	Gold	25,000^{^}
^{^} Shipments figures based on certification alone.

== United DJ's vs. Pandora remix ==
"Trust Me"

Single by United DJs vs Pandora

from the album Celebration
- Released: September 2006
- Genre: Eurodance; house
- Length: 3:47
- Label: Capitol Records
- Songwriters: Martin Ankelius; Peter Johansson
- Producers: Vasco & Millboy

United DJs vs Pandora singles chronology
"I'm Confused" (2004)	"Trust Me" (2006)	"Don't You Know" (2007)

In 2006, "Trust Me" was remixed and re-released by United DJs vs. Pandora. The song was released in September 2006 by Capitol Records as the lead single from United DJs vs. Pandora's album, Celebration (2007).

The song peaked at number two on the Swedish Singles Chart, spending 32 weeks in the top 50.

=== Track listing ===
- CD single, Sweden (2006)
1. "Trust Me" (Radio Edit) – 3:47
2. "Trust Me" (Extended) – 6:09

=== Charts ===
Chart (2006/07)	Peak position
Sweden (Sverigetopplistan)	2
