= The Naked Sun (song) =

Single by Pandora

from the album Tell the World
- Released: April 1995
- Recorded: 1994/95
- Studio: Stocksund, Stockholm, Sweden
- Genre: Dance; Eurodance; house
- Length: 3:58
- Label: Virgin Records
- Songwriter(s): Henrik Andersson; Peter Johansson
- Producer(s): Sir Martin; Huma; Peka P.

Pandora singles chronology
"Don't You Know" (1995)	"The Naked Sun" (1995)	"One of Us" (1995)

"The Naked Sun" is a song by Swedish singer Pandora. It was released in April 1995 as the third single from her second studio album Tell the World (1995). It features an uncredited rap by M-Fuse. The song became Pandora's fifth top 5 single in Finland.

== Track listing ==
- CD Single
1. "The Naked Sun" (Radio Edit) - 3:58
2. "The Naked Sun" (The Bedouin House Camp) - 4:16
3. "The Naked Sun" (Tell The Sun Mix) - 3:40

== Chart performance ==
Chart (1995)	Peak position
Europe (Eurochart Hot 100)	98
Finland (Finnish Singles Chart)	3
Sweden (Sverigetopplistan)	29
