= Tell the World (Pandora song) =

1994 single by Pandora

Single by Pandora

from the album Tell the World
- Released: October 1994
- Studio: Stocksund (Stockholm, Sweden)
- Genre: Reggae fusion
- Length: 3:37
- Label: Virgin
- Songwriters: Henrik Andersson; Martin Akelius; Peter Johansson
- Producers: Dr Maxx Family; Sir Martin

Pandora singles chronology
"Something's Gone" (1994)	"Tell the World" (1994)	"Don't You Know" (1995)

Music video
- "Tell the World" on YouTube

"Tell the World" is a song by Swedish singer and songwriter Pandora, released in October 1994 by Virgin Records as the lead single from her second studio album, Tell the World (1995). The song is written by Henrik Andersson, Martin Akelius and Peter Johansson, and features an uncredited rap by M-Fuse (Matthews Green). It became Pandora's third top-5 single in Sweden, peaking at number five on Sverigetopplistan. In Finland, "Tell the World" spent two weeks at number three. The accompanying music video was directed by Stefan Berg, who had previously directed videos for groups like Fun Factory and Rednex.

== Critical reception ==
Pan-European magazine Music & Media wrote, "Tell the world another talented Swedish singer has just stood up to be counted. The reggae set-up has Ace of Base cleverness, while the singing is ABBA-esque and the rapper is the finishing Euro touch." Manila Standard commented that "you are swept by the dizzying beat" of the song.

== Track listings ==
- CD single
1. "Tell the World" (Radio Edit) - 3:37
2. "Tell the World" (Extended Club Mix) - 5:29
- CD maxi
1. "Tell the World" (Radio Edit) - 3:37
2. "Tell the World" (Extended Club Mix) - 5:29
3. "Tell the World" (Straight Outta Kalahari) - 3:37

== Charts ==
=== Weekly charts ===
Chart (1994–1995)	Peak position
Australia (ARIA)	247
Europe (Eurochart Hot 100)	53
Finland (Finnish Singles Chart)	3
Israel (Israeli Singles Chart)	21
Sweden (Sverigetopplistan)	5
Sweden Airplay (Swedish Radio Chart Tracks)	8
Sweden Dance (Swedish Dance Chart)	10

=== Year-end charts ===
Chart (1994)	Position
Sweden (Topplistan)	63

== United DJ's vs. Pandora remix ==
"Tell the World"

Single by United DJs vs Pandora

from the album Celebration
- Released: July 2007
- Length: 3:09
- Label: Capitol
- Songwriters: Martin Ankelius; Peter Johansson
- Producers: Pitchtunes and Playmaker

United DJs vs Pandora singles chronology
"Don't You Know" (2007)	"Tell the World" (2007)	"On a Night Like This" (2007)

"Tell the World" was re-released in July 2007 as the third single from United DJs vs. Pandora's album, Celebration (2007). The song peaked at number seven on the Swedish Singles Chart.

=== Track listing ===
Swedish and Finnish CD single (2007)

1. "Tell the World" (Radio Edit) - 3:09
2. "Tell the World" (Groove Maniax Casablanca Edit) - 3:17
3. "Tell the World" (Groove Maniax Casablanca Extended) - 4:12
4. "Tell the World" (Team Dicaster Funky-String Edit) - 3:23

=== Charts ===
==== Weekly charts ====
Chart (2007)	Peak position
Finland (Suomen virallinen lista)	12
Sweden (Sverigetopplistan)	7

==== Year-end charts ====
Chart (2007)	Position
Sweden (Sverigetopplistan)	66
