= Don't You Know (Pandora song) =

1995 single by Pandora

Single by Pandora

from the album Tell the World
- Released: February 1995
- Length: 3:49
- Label: MCA Dance Department; Stockhouse
- Songwriters: Martin Ankelius; Peter Johansson
- Producers: Sir Martin; Huma; Peka P.

Pandora singles chronology
| "Tell the World" (1994) | "Don't You Know" (1995) | "The Naked Sun" (1995) |

Music video
- "Don't You Know" on YouTube

"Don't You Know" is a song by Swedish singer Pandora. It was released in February 1995, by MCA Dance Department and Stockhouse, as the second single from Pandora's second studio album, Tell the World (1995). The song is written by Martin Ankelius and Peter Johansson, and peaked at number seven in Sweden, number one in Finland, and it also became a top-30 hit in Israel. A remix by United DJ's in 2007 subsequently topped the Swedish chart.

== Track listing ==
- Swedish CD single
1. "Don't You Know" (Radio Edit) – 3:49
2. "Don't You Know" (The Sir Family Extended Mix) – 6:24
- Swedish CD maxi single
1. "Don't You Know" (Radio Edit) – 3:49
2. "Don't You Know" (The Sir Family Extended Mix) – 6:24
3. "Don't You Know" (Peka P's Alternative Edit) – 5:35
4. "Don't You Know" (Huma's Typhoon Edit) – 6:54
- Swedish 12-inch single

A1. "Don't You Know" (The Sir Family Extended Mix) – 6:24
B1. "Don't You Know" (Peka P's Alternative Edit) – 5:35
B2. "Don't You Know" (Radio Edit) – 3:49

- German CD maxi single
1. "Don't You Know" (Original Radio Edit) – 3:50
2. "Don't You Know" (Clock's "Ten To Two" Radio Mix) – 3:22
3. "Don't You Know" (Primax NRG Mix) – 5:29
4. "Don't You Know" (Man City Vocal Mix) – 6:54
5. "Don't You Know" (Primax V.E. Day Mix) – 4:53
6. "Don't You Know" (The Sir Family Extended Mix) – 6:17
7. "Don't You Know" (Clock's "Ten To Two" Mix) – 5:16
8. "Don't You Know" (Overworld Dub) – 5:29

== Charts ==
=== Weekly charts ===
| Chart (1995) | Peak position |
|---|---|
| Europe (Eurochart Hot 100) | 41 |
| Finland (Suomen virallinen lista) | 1 |
| Israel (Israeli Singles Chart) | 27 |
| Sweden (Sverigetopplistan) | 7 |
| Sweden Airplay (Swedish Radio Chart Tracks) | 2 |
| Sweden Dance (Swedish Dance Chart) | 12 |

=== Year-end charts ===
| Chart (1995) | Position |
|---|---|
| Sweden (Topplistan) | 61 |

== United DJ's vs. Pandora remix ==
"Don't You Know"

Single by United DJ's vs. Pandora

from the album Celebration
- Released: 17 January 2007
- Length: 3:45
- Label: Capitol
- Songwriters: Martin Ankelius; Peter Johansson
- Producer: Soundcruisers

United DJ's vs. Pandora singles chronology
| "Trust Me" (2006) | "Don't You Know" (2007) | "Tell the World" (2007) |

In 2006, "Don't You Know" was remixed and re-released by United DJ's vs. Pandora. The song was released on 17 January 2007 as the second single from United DJ's vs. Pandora's album, Celebration (2007).

The song reached the top of the Swedish Singles Chart on 25 January 2007, staying one week at the top, three weeks in top five and 20 weeks in total on the Swedish chart. It also peaked at number four in Finland.

=== Track listing ===
Swedish and Finnish CD single (2007)

1. "Don't You Know" (Soundcruiser's Radio Mix) – 3:45
2. "Don't You Know" (Soundcruiser's Extended) – 5:48

Remixes

1. "Don't You Know" (Magic Mitch & DJ Nico Extended Mix) – 7:22
2. "Don't You Know" (Soundcruisers Extended Mix) – 5:48
3. "Don't You Know" (The Chuck Norris Experiment) – 3:58
4. "Don't You Know" (Groove Factory Mix) – 4:18
5. "Don't You Know" (Magic Mitch & DJ Nico Radio Mix) – 4:11
6. "Don't You Know" (Soundcruisers Radio Mix) – 3:44
7. "Don't You Know" (R-Spec Trance Mix) – 6:27

=== Charts ===
==== Weekly charts ====
| Chart (2007) | Peak position |
|---|---|
| Finland (Suomen virallinen lista) | 4 |
| Sweden (Sverigetopplistan) | 1 |

==== Year-end charts ====
| Chart (2007) | Position |
|---|---|
| Sweden (Sverigetopplistan) | 24 |

== See also ==
- List of number-one singles of 1995 (Finland)
- List of number-one singles of 2007 (Sweden)
