= One of a Kind (Pandora song) =

Single by Pandora

from the album One of a Kind
- Released: April 1994
- Recorded: 1993
- Genre: Dance; Eurodance; House
- Length: 3:37
- Label: Virgin Records
- Songwriter(s): Martin Akelius; Peter Johansson

Pandora singles chronology
"Come On And Do It" (1993)	"One of a Kind" (1994)	"Something's Gone" (1994)

"One of a Kind" is a song by Swedish singer Pandora. It was released in April 1994 as the third single from the debut studio album One of a Kind (1993). It features an uncredited rap by K-Slim. The song peaked at number 33 on the Swedish charts.

== Track listing ==
- CD Single
1. "One of a Kind" (Radio Edit) - 3:37
2. "One of a Kind" (D-House Remix) - 4:44
- CD Maxi
1. "One of a Kind" (Radio Edit) - 3:37
2. "One of a Kind" (D-House Remix) - 4:44
3. "Going to the Top" - 3:26

== Chart performance ==
Chart (1994)	Peak position
Finland (Finnish Singles Chart)	19
Sweden (Sverigetopplistan)	33
