= One of Us (ABBA song) =

1981 single by ABBA

Single by ABBA

from the album The Visitors
- B-side: "Should I Laugh or Cry"
- Released: 4 December 1981
- Recorded: 21 October 1981
- Studio: Polar Music
- Genre: Pop
- Length: 3:55
- Label: Polar
- Songwriters: Benny Andersson; Björn Ulvaeus
- Producers: Benny Andersson; Björn Ulvaeus

ABBA singles chronology
"Lay All Your Love on Me" (1981)	"One of Us" (1981)	"When All Is Said and Done" (1981)

Music video
- "One of Us" on YouTube

Alternative cover
- 1983 US single cover, used to promote The Singles: The First Ten Years

"One of Us" is a song by Swedish pop group ABBA. It was released on 4 December 1981 by Polar Music as the lead single from the band's eighth studio album, The Visitors (1981). The track features Agnetha Fältskog as the lead vocalist. Lyrically, the track follows a woman trying to revive a failed relationship. The song's B-side was the non-album track "Should I Laugh or Cry".

The single received positive reviews from music critics and was seen as a more mature song. It would go on to become the last major hit for ABBA, topping the music charts in Belgium, Denmark, Ireland, the Netherlands, and West Germany. In addition, the single peaked within the top ten in seven other countries, including the United Kingdom, where it peaked at number three on the UK singles chart, becoming the group's twentieth and final consecutive top ten hit there. The track proved less successful in Australasia, failing to enter the top forty in either Australia or New Zealand.

In North America, "One of Us" was skipped by Atlantic Records in favor of "When All Is Said and Done" as the lead single for The Visitors, as they had more faith in the latter becoming a hit. As a result, "One of Us" was not issued as a single in the region until February 1983 to promote their compilation The Singles: The First Ten Years (1982). When it was released, it did not become a success, charting at number 107 on the Billboard Bubbling Under Hot 100 chart.

The music video for the song was directed by Lasse Hallström, featuring Fältskog as a woman moving into her new house. It has since been covered by Pandora in 1995, A-Teens in 1999 and Cher in 2018. In 2017, Billboard named "One of Us" the fifth best ABBA song in their list of "The 15 Best ABBA Songs".

== Background and release ==
"One of Us"—which had the working titles "Nummer 1" ("Number 1") and "Mi amore"—was one of the last songs recorded for ABBA's 1981 album The Visitors, and features a lead vocal by Agnetha Fältskog. It was one of a number of tracks that explored the darker territory of Björn Ulvaeus and Benny Andersson's songwriting, as the two men's divorces were beginning to influence their musical output. The message of the song is about a woman trying to revive a relationship she had ended. Despite misgivings on the part of manager Stig Anderson, and its somewhat depressing lyric, "One of Us" was released as the first single from The Visitors, coupled with the non-album track "Should I Laugh or Cry". Ulvaeus had favoured releasing it as the first single from the new album, and the majority of the record companies agreed with him; it proved a wise move, as it would become ABBA's final No. 1 single of their career. The decision to release "One of Us" as a single was made so late that it did not become available in Swedish shops until after The Visitors had been released.

In the United Kingdom, "One of Us" was issued in a different sleeve. Whereas the sleeve used in most countries repeated the album cover photo, Epic Records wanted a different image for the British release and used separate photos of the group members together with a large ABBA logo. Agnetha and Frida appeared on the front cover, with Björn and Benny on the back. The photos were actually out-of-date, as Frida was depicted still with her frizzy perm, while Björn was beardless. A limited-edition picture disc using very similar artwork was also issued.

The B-side, "Should I Laugh or Cry", included a spoken count-in (in Swedish) from Benny. This count-in appeared on the British and South African releases, but not internationally. The master tapes supplied to Epic contained the error, but were not picked up in time, and so appeared on the single release. In the early 2000s, Epic's rights to ABBA's music in the UK had long since expired; however, they still owned all the UK master tapes for the singles. These were then returned to Polar Music (itself owned by Universal Music) in Stockholm, who later issued the error count-in version as a "rarity" on The Complete Studio Recordings box-set, thereby making it available to a worldwide audience (and on CD for the first time). This count-in version is also available on the special "Deluxe Edition" of The Visitors (released on 23 April 2012).

== Critical reception ==
American magazine Cash Box reviewed the single, saying that "a strong but subtle orchestration provides the backdrop for Agnetha Faltskog’s vocals, with a cadre of mandolins adding a romantic flourish". Gavin Martin for New Musical Express wrote favorably for "One of Us", and how it is "another spirited confirmation of their worth." In 2017, Billboard named "One of Us" the fifth best ABBA song in their list of "The 15 Best ABBA Songs", writing, "The single marked a darker shift in the group's later material, while blending uplifting harmonies on the heartbreaking chorus ("One of us is crying / One of us is only / Waiting for a call… / Wishing she had never left at all") to encapsulate the emotional depth baked into the group's history that makes them sound so good."

== Commercial performance ==
"One of Us" was the first official single release after both couples within the band had divorced. It would become ABBA's last major hit for 40 years, and the last No. 1 single of their career. It topped the charts in Belgium, Denmark, West Germany, Ireland and the Netherlands, and was also ABBA's 13th and final No. 1 on the Eurochart. "One of Us" proved a successful hit in Austria, Norway, South Africa, Spain and Switzerland, reaching the Top 10 in all of these countries.

In the United Kingdom, "One of Us" debuted at No. 11 on the singles chart on 6 December 1981 and peaked at No. 3 the following week, where it stayed for three weeks; it remained in the chart for 10 weeks. Upon exiting the Top 10 of the chart on 16 January 1982, "One of Us" would mark ABBA's final appearance in the UK Top 10 for 39 years. It was awarded a gold disc for sales of 500,000 in the UK. As of September 2021, it is ABBA's 15th-biggest song in the UK, including both pure sales and digital streams.

"One of Us" was not released as a single in the United States until February 1983, and proved to be ABBA's worst-ever performing charting song in that territory, reaching a high of No. 107, though this came more than a year after its release elsewhere and ABBA had disbanded by that time.

== Music video ==
In November 1981, a music video for "One of Us" was filmed, directed by Swedish film director Lasse Hallström. It sees Agnetha Fältskog playing a woman who is moving into a new house. She decorates the room by adding furniture and colouring the walls. This is interspersed with individual shots of the ABBA members in a studio standing against a wall of mirrors.

A lyric video featuring excerpts and clips from its 1981 music video was released on ABBA's YouTube channel on 27 April 2023.

== Personnel ==
ABBA

- Agnetha Fältskog – lead vocals
- Anni-Frid Lyngstad – backing vocals
- Björn Ulvaeus – guitar, mandolin, backing vocals
- Benny Andersson – keyboards, synthesizer, backing vocals

Additional personnel

- Lasse Wellander – guitar, mandolin
- Rutger Gunnarsson – bass, mandolin
- Ola Brunkert – drums
- Åke Sundqvist – percussion

== Charts ==
=== Weekly charts ===
Chart (1981–83)	Peak position
Australia (Kent Music Report)	48
Austria (Ö3 Austria Top 40)	3
Belgium (Ultratop 50 Flanders)	1
Denmark (Hitlisten)	1
European Singles (Europarade)	1
Finland (Suomen virallinen lista)	13
France (IFOP)	14
Ireland (IRMA)	1
Israel (Israeli Singles Chart)	2
Netherlands (Dutch Top 40)	1
Netherlands (Single Top 100)	1
New Zealand (Recorded Music NZ)	43
Norway (VG-lista)	6
South Africa (Springbok Radio)	4
Spain (AFYVE)	7
Sweden (Sverigetopplistan)	13
Switzerland (Schweizer Hitparade)	3
UK Singles (Official Charts)	3
US Bubbling Under the Hot 100 (Billboard)	107
US Adult Contemporary (Billboard)	33
West Germany (GfK)	1

=== Year-end charts ===
Chart (1981)	Position
Netherlands (Single Top 100)	60

Chart (1982)	Position
Belgium (Ultratop)	19
Netherlands (Dutch Top 40)	97
West Germany (Media Control)	25

== Pandora version ==
"One of Us"

Single by Pandora

from the album Tell the World
- Released: June 1995
- Length: 3:56
- Label: MCA
- Songwriters: Benny Andersson; Björn Ulvaeus
- Producers: Huma; Peka P.; Martin Ankelius

Pandora singles chronology
"The Naked Sun" (1995)	"One of Us" (1995)	"A Little Bit" (1996)

In June 1995, Swedish Eurodance singer Pandora released a cover version of "One of Us" through MCA Records. The track was included on the Japanese edition of her second studio album, Tell the World (1995). The song peaked at No. 13 in Sweden, and reached the top spot in Finland.

=== Charts ===
==== Weekly charts ====
Chart (1995)	Peak position
Europe (Eurochart Hot 100)	46
Finland (Finnish Singles Chart)	1
Sweden (Sverigetopplistan)	13

==== Year-end charts ====
Chart (1995)	Position
Sweden (Topplistan)	83

=== See also ===
- List of number-one singles of 1995 (Finland)

== A-Teens version ==
The A-Teens released a version of "One of Us" on their debut album The ABBA Generation in 1999.

As an attempt to promote the A-Teens a bit more, Universal Music Group released a one-track promo single of "One of Us" on radio in late 1999. The song was promoted in Scandinavia, Mexico, Chile, Argentina and Japan.

A special music video was filmed for a TV special in Sweden. It was not used as an official video. It shows parts of shows in Sweden and behind-the-scenes footage of the band having fun, waiting in a room at Stockholm Records' building.

== Mamma Mia! Here We Go Again version ==
"One of Us" was released on 13 July 2018, alongside the soundtrack of Mamma Mia! Here We Go Again, by Capitol and Polydor Records. The song is performed by Amanda Seyfried (Sophie) and Dominic Cooper (Sky) and it was produced by Benny Andersson.

=== Charts ===
Chart (2018)	Peak position
Scottish Singles Sales (Official Charts)	60

=== Certifications ===
Certifications for "One of Us"
Region	Certification	Certified units/sales
United Kingdom (BPI)	Silver	200,000^{‡}
^{‡} Sales+streaming figures based on certification alone.

== Cher version ==
"One of Us"

Promotional single by Cher

from the album Dancing Queen
- Released: 21 September 2018
- Recorded: 2018
- Studio: Metrophonic Studios (London, England)
- Genre: Pop
- Length: 3:53
- Label: Warner Bros.
- Songwriters: Benny Andersson; Björn Ulvaeus
- Producer: Mark Taylor

Licensed audio
- "One of Us" on YouTube

"One of Us" was chosen as the third single from Cher's 2018 ABBA tribute album Dancing Queen, released by Warner Bros. Records on 28 September 2018. The track was digitally released on 21 September 2018, at each country's individual midnight time.

=== Critical reception ===
Marc Snetiker from Entertainment Weekly gave the album a favourable review, calling it Cher's "most significant release since 1998’s Believe" and saying that "the album ender, 'One of Us,' is frankly one of Cher’s best recordings in years." Billboard also noted that "while the original song is filled with funky melodies and rhythms to mix up the depressing lyrics, Cher trades them in for a piano and a few violins, making the already-melancholy song a bonafide heart-wrencher." Writing for Rolling Stone, Brittany Spanos felt that ""One of Us" in particular sees the biggest musical shift of any of the songs; the original is a breezy, tropical, mid-tempo pop moment that almost disguises the sadness of the lyrics. But that sadness can never hide from Cher, who strips it down to strings, piano and vocals, making sure you can feel every bit of the ego-shedding on the track."

=== Music video ===
On the same day as its release, an animated video of a blue vinyl's B-side playing along with the song was released on Cher's YouTube channel. The vinyl represents the Dancing Queen album while the B-side contains the songs "Mamma Mia", "Chiquitita", "Fernando", "The Winner Takes It All" and "One of Us".

=== Live performances ===
Cher tweeted that after one of the shows of her Here We Go Again Tour she went into empty arena and sang "One of Us", claiming that it was "not ready....but it was pretty good" and that she was "working on it".

=== Track listings and formats ===
==== Digital download ====
- "One of Us" – 3:53

=== Credits and personnel ===
Credits for Dancing Queen adapted from AllMusic.

==== Management ====
- Published by Universal Songs of PolyGramInt., Inc. (ASCAP) and EMI Waterford Music Inc. (ASCAP)
- Recorded by Mark Taylor and Paul Meehan at Metrophonic Studios, London
- Mixed at by Matt Furmidge and Mark Taylor at Metrophonic Studios, London
- Mastered by Stephen Marcussen Mastering, Hollywood, CA

==== Personnel ====
- Cher – primary vocals
- Benny Andersson – songwriter
- Björn Ulvaeus – songwriter
- Ash Soan – drums
- Adam Phillips – guitars
- Hayley Sanderson – backing vocals
- Andy Caine – backing vocals

== Other cover versions ==
Schlager singer Marianne Rosenberg recorded the song in German, titled "Ich sah deine Tränen" (Translation: I saw your tears). The song peaked at No. 66 in the West German Singles Top 100 charts.

German pop group Just Friends released "One of Us" in 1996, peaking at number 53 in the German Singles Top 100 charts

German band Dune and The London Session Orchestra released "One of Us" in 1998, peaking at number 78 in the German Singles Top 100 charts.
