= Come On and Do It =

Single by Pandora

from the album One of a Kind
- Released: December 1993
- Recorded: June 1993
- Studio: Stocksund, Stockholm, Sweden
- Genre: Eurodance; house
- Length: 3:18
- Label: Virgin
- Songwriters: Tervald Andersson; Martin Akelius; Peter Johansson
- Producer: Dr. Maxx Family

Pandora singles chronology
"Trust Me" (1993)	"Come On and Do It" (1993)	"One of a Kind" (1994)

Music video
- "Come On And Do It" on YouTube

"Come On and Do It" is a song by Swedish singer Pandora, released in December 1993 by Virgin Records as the second single from the singer's debut studio album, One of a Kind (1993). The song is written by Tervald Andersson, Martin Akelius and Peter Johansson, and also features an uncredited rap by K-Slim. In Europe, it was a top-10 hit in both Finland and Sweden. On the Eurochart Hot 100, "Come On and Do It" peaked at number 51. Outside Europe, the single was a hit in Israel, peaking at number eight, and it also charted in Australia.

== Track listing ==
- CD single
1. "Come On and Do It" (Radio Edit) — 3:18
2. "Come On and Do It" (The Funky Ride Version II) — 4:14
- CD maxi
1. "Come On and Do It" (Radio Edit) — 3:18
2. "Come On and Do It" (The Funky Ride Version II) — 4:14
3. "Get Your Chance" — 3:45

== Charts ==
=== Weekly charts ===
Chart (1993–1994)	Peak position
Australia (ARIA)	166
Europe (Eurochart Hot 100)	51
Finland (Suomen virallinen lista)	4
Israel (Israeli Singles Chart)	8
Sweden (Sverigetopplistan)	5

=== Year-end charts ===
Chart (1994)	Position
Sweden (Topplistan)	56
