= One of a Kind (Pandora album) =

Studio album by Pandora
- Released: November 1993
- Recorded: 1993
- Genre: dance; Eurodance; house; Hi NRG
- Length: 51:01
- Label: Virgin Records
- Producer: Sir Martin; Joakim Björklund; Sören Elofsson; Dr Maxx Family

Pandora chronology
One of a Kind (1993)	Tell the World (1995)

Singles from One of a Kind
- 1. "Trust Me" Released: October 1993; 2. "Come On And Do It" Released: December 1993; 3. "One of a Kind" Released: April 1994; 4. "Something's Gone" Released: May 1994

One of a Kind is the debut studio album by Swedish singer Pandora, released in Sweden in November 1993 by Virgin Records. The album debuted and peaked at number 12 in Sweden.

== Track listing ==
1. "I'm Beginning to Fly" (intro) (Peter Johansson) – 1:25
2. "Another Party" (Henrik Andersson, Johasson) – 4:07
3. "Trust Me" (Andersson, Martin Ankelius, Johasson) – 3:25
4. "Going to the Top" (Andersson, Johasson) – 3:47
5. "Come On and Do It" (Andersson, Johasson) – 3:18
6. "One of a Kind" (Andersson, Ankelius, Johasson) – 3:47
7. "Get Your Chance" (Andersson, Johasson) – 3:45
8. "Promise" (Johasson) – 4:27
9. "Dizzharmonie" (Andersson, Ankelius) – 4:25
10. "Join Me Now" (Andersson, Ankelius, Johasson) – 4:00
11. "Something's Gone" (Andersson, Johasson) – 4:47
12. "Trust Me" (Club Extended) (Andersson, Akelius, Johasson) – 5:34
13. "Come On and Do It" (The Funky Ride Version II) (Andersson, Johasson) – 4:14

== Charts ==
Chart (1993/94)	Peak position
Australian Albums (ARIA)	150
Swedish Albums (Sverigetopplistan)	13

== Certifications ==
Region	Certification	Certified units/sales
Sweden (GLF)	Gold	50,000^{^}
^{^} Shipments figures based on certification alone.

== Release history ==
Region	Date	Format	Label	Catalogue
Sweden	November 1993	CD, Cassette	Virgin Records	724383932924
