= Tell the World (Pandora album) =

Studio album by Pandora
- Released: February 1995
- Genres: Electronic; dance; Eurodance; house; Hi NRG; pop
- Label: Virgin Records / MCA Records
- Producers: Sir Martin; Huma; Peka P.

Pandora chronology
One of a Kind (1993)	Tell the World (1995)	Changes (1996)

Singles from Tell the World
- 1. "Tell the World" Released: October 1994; 2. "Don't You Know" Released: February 1995; 3. "The Naked Sun" Released: April 1995; 4. "One of Us" Released: June 1995

Alternative cover
- Japanese version

Professional ratings
Review scores
Source	Rating
AllMusic	2.5/5 stars

Tell the World is the second studio album by Swedish singer Pandora, released in Sweden in February 1995 by Virgin Records. The album peaked at number 11 in Sweden. The Japanese edition featured "One of Us", originally by ABBA. By September 1996, the album had sold over 455,000 copies in Japan alone.

== Reception ==
Billboard magazine said; "The blonde dance queen Pandora has raised a storm on Scandinavian dance floors over the past two years with her upbeat and direct tracks. Branded the Swedish Madonna, her strongest following is in Finland where her album has gone platinum (50,000 units)."

== Track listing ==
1. "The Outer Reaches" (intro) (Peter Johansson) – 1:11
2. "Don't You Know" (Martin Ankelius, Johansson) – 3:50
3. "The Naked Sun" (Ankelius, Johansson) – 4:12
4. "Tell the World" (Henrik Anderson, Ankelius, Johansson) – 3:39
5. "Love is a Stranger" (Anderson, Johansson) – 3:45
6. "Don't Let Me" (Anderson, Johansson) – 4:23
7. "Take My Hand" (Anderson, Ankelius, Johansson) – 3:52
8. "Can't Fake the Feeling" (Ankelius, Johansson) – 3:18
9. "Bedtime" (Anderson, Ankelius, Johansson) – 3:01
10. "Work" (Ankelius) – 3:36
11. "Rely" (Anderson) – 4:24
12. "Kalahari" (Anderson, Ankelius, Johansson) – 3:49
13. "Don't You Know" (The Sir Family Extended) (Ankelius, Johansson) – 6:18
14. "One of Us" (Japanese edition only) (Benny Andersson, Björn Ulvaeus)– 4:46

== Charts ==
Chart (1995)	Peak position
Finland (IFPI)	3
Swedish Albums (Sverigetopplistan)	11

== Certifications ==
Region	Certification	Certified units/sales
Sweden (GLF)	Gold	50,000^{^}
Japan (RIAJ)	Gold	100,000^{^}
^{^} Shipments figures based on certification alone.

== Release history ==
Region	Date	Format	Label	Catalogue
Sweden/ Finland	February 1995	CD, Cassette	Virgin Records	724384026721
Japan	March 1996	CD, Cassette	MCA Records	MVCM-580
