= Pandora (singer) =

Swedish Singer

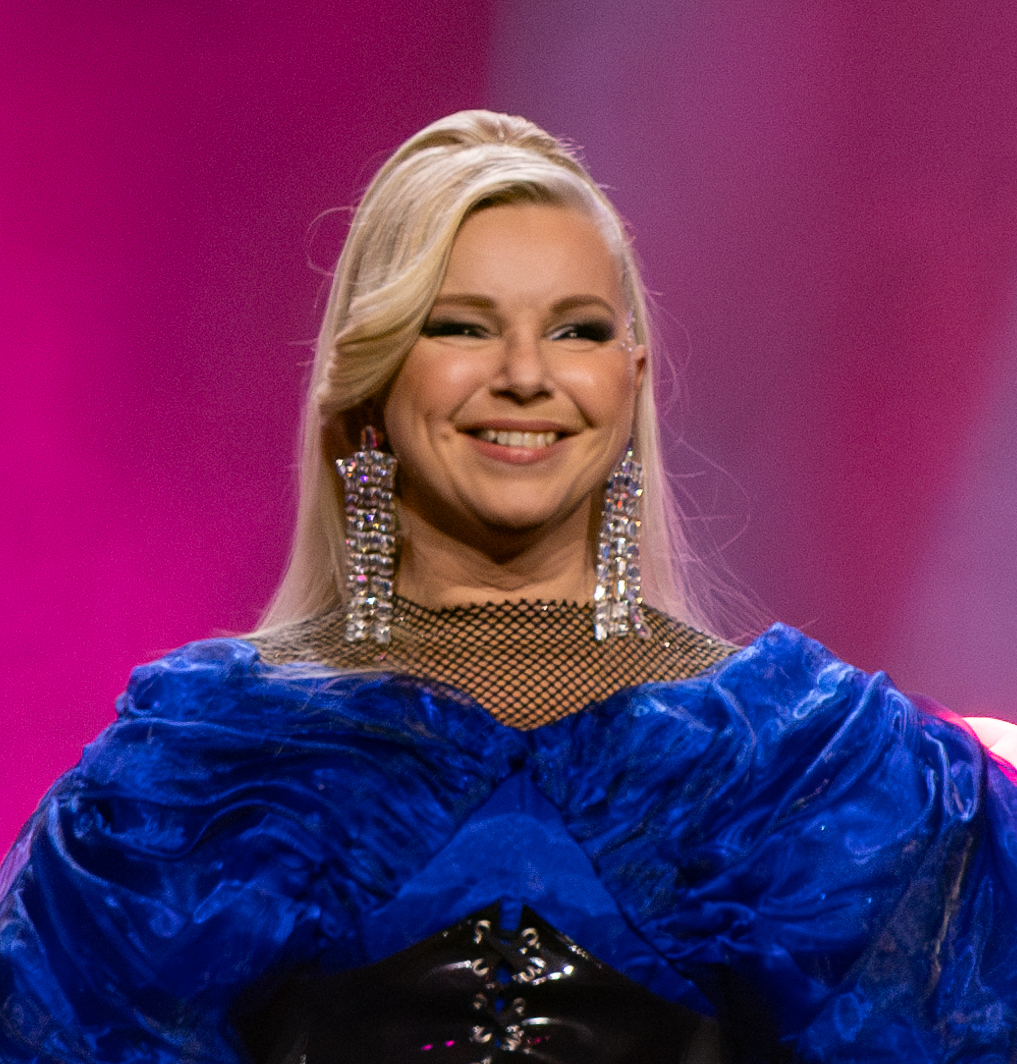
- Pandora performing as the opening number of heat 3 of Melodifestivalen 2025 in Västerås

Background information
- Also known as: Pandora
- Born: Anneli Magnusson; 20 June 1970 (age 56)
- Origin: Västerås, Sweden
- Genres: Pop; eurodance; Europop
- Occupations: Singer, songwriter
- Instrument: Vocals
- Years active: 1993–present
- Website: www.pandora.se

Anneli Magnusson, known by her stage names Pandora and United DJs vs. Pandora, is a Swedish Eurodance singer.

== Musical career ==
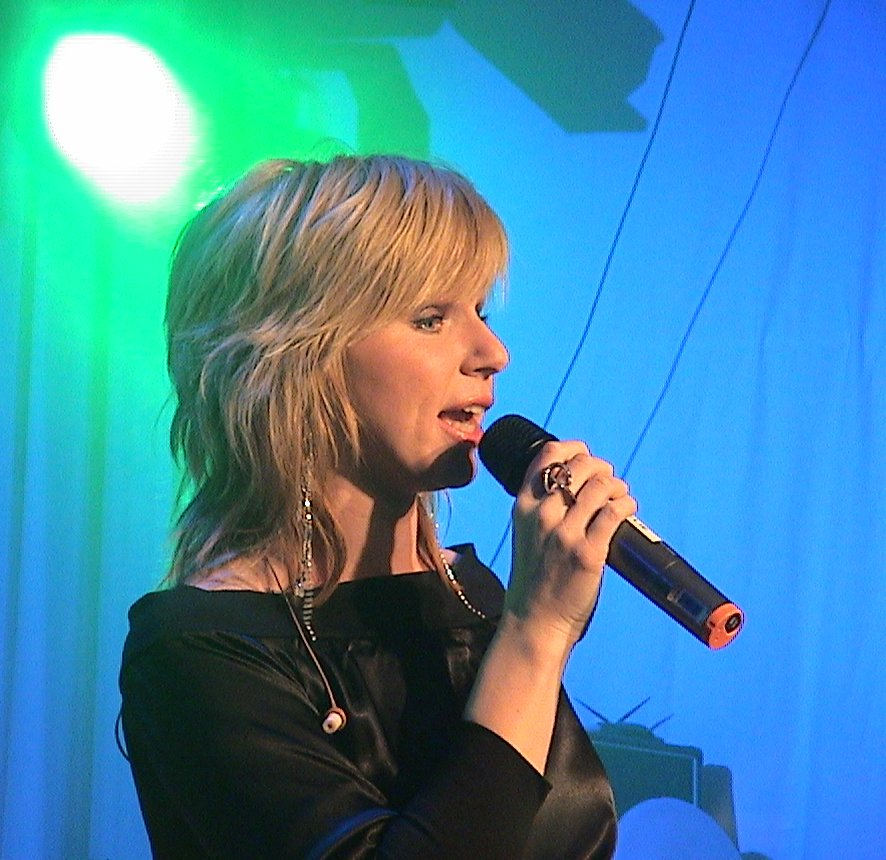
Pandora performing at the Blue Moon Bar in Karlstad, Sweden in November 2004

Magnusson grew up with her family outside of Västerås. She learned to play the guitar at an early age. In her teenage years, Magnusson started performing on stage, playing acoustic versions of songs and she could also be seen with different bands, mostly singing rock covers. She was accepted into the musical college Carlforsska, and it was here where she met Henrik Andersson, Martin Ankelius and Peka P. known as Hit Vision. Hit Vision were looking for 'a girl with an attitude in her voice, someone who could sing their melodic dance music'. In 1993, Magnusson and Hit Vision moved to Stockholm and signed with Virgin Records. In October 1993, her debut single "Trust Me" was released under the artist name Pandora. "Trust Me" became the best-selling local single of the year and went gold. Her debut studio album One of a Kind, was released in November 1993, bringing the singer further fame and achieving gold status in both Sweden and Finland and making Pandora the best-selling dance act in Scandinavia (Fennoscandia). "Come On And Do It" was released in December 1993 and also peaked in the top 5 in Finland and Sweden.

In February 1995, Pandora's second album Tell the World was released. In Scandinavia sales of the album again exceeded the 100,000 mark. In addition, Japanese audiences turned out to be very enthusiastic about Pandora. Tell the World selling more than 1 million albums in Asia alone.

Pandora's third album Changes was released in December 1996. It was Pandora's debut release with her new record company Universal Music. Sticking to the motto "never change a winning team", Pandora once again collaborated with her creative trio of Ankelius/Andersson/Johansson. Pandora toured through Scandinavia in the spring and summer of 1997 and did her first 2-week live tour through the main cities of Japan. In December 1997, This Could Be Heaven was released. The album went platinum in Japan within six weeks. Pandora had written three of the songs herself on this album. In 1998, Pandora released "Spirit to Win" which was the official track of the 1998 Winter Olympics in Nagano, Japan. In February 1999, Pandora released Breathe and a similar album released as Blue in Australia. No Regrets, was recorded between August and November 1999 and was released in end of 1999. It included the track "On a Night Like This".

Pandora's seventh studio album, A Little Closer was released in 2001, but failed to chart. Won't Look Back was released in 2002. In 2003, Pandora competed in the Melodifestivalen 2003 with the song "You". The track failed to make it past the heats. Later in 2003, Pandora released her ninth studio album, 9 Lives, which peaked on the Swedish chart at 16. In 2004, Pandora competed again in the Melodifestivalen 2004 with the song "Runaway". The track also failed to make it past the heats.

On 28 March 2007, Pandora accused British Eurovision act Scooch of having plagiarized her 1999 song "No Regrets" and planned to file a complaint with the EBU. In response to the plagiarism claim, BBC issued a statement saying that Scooch's song is "an original" and the writers "were never aware of Pandora or her songs". BBC confirmed that there had been no duplication of her work.

In November 2007, Pandora released the album, Celebration with United DJs. The album was a collaboration with selected DJs in the recording studio, re-recording and remixing her biggest hits. The album peaked at number 38 in Sweden. In November 2011, Pandora released her tenth studio album, Head Up High.

In spring 2020, Pandora participated in the Finnish version of the TV show Masked Singer as the Peacock. The next year, she entered Uuden Musiikin Kilpailu, the Finnish selection process for the Eurovision Song Contest 2021, singing the song "I Love You" with the Teflon Brothers where they came in 2nd place behind Blind Channel.

== Personal life ==
Magnusson has a son with whom she lived in Sweden. She also had an apartment in Vantaa, Finland, with Finnish former ice hockey player Mikko Peltonen, to whom she got engaged in 2014. In 2026 the couple moved to Störsvik in Siuntio, Finland.

== Discography ==
=== Albums ===
Studio albums

- One of a Kind (1993)
- Tell the World (1995)
- Changes (1996)
- This Could Be Heaven (1997)
- Breathe (1999)
- No Regrets (1999)
- A Little Closer (2000)
- Won't Look Back (2002)
- 9 Lives (2003)
- Head Up High (2011)

Compilations

- Best of Pandora (1997)
- Pandora's Hit Box (1998)
- Greatest Hits & Remixes (2005)
- Celebration (2007) (United DJs vs. Pandora)
