= Dick Cavett Meets ABBA =

- Promotional photo after interview
- Original language: English; German

Production
- Production locations: SVT Studios, Stockholm, Sweden

Original release
- Release: 12 September 1981

Dick Cavett Meets ABBA is a 1981 television special in which the American television personality Dick Cavett interviewed the Swedish pop group ABBA. The group also took to the stage, performing nine songs in a so-called "mini-concert". A one-off broadcast was filmed and produced by Sveriges Television (SVT) in Stockholm, Sweden and broadcast 12 September 1981 as "Dick Cavett Meets ABBA".

Rehearsals took place at the end of April; while Cavett's interview with the four members was conducted on 27 April 1981. The live performances were recorded on 28–29 April 1981.

"On and On and On"

The show consisted of a casual interview and a short concert, where the band performed nine songs, including two from the forthcoming album The Visitors.

This was ABBA's last (live) concert.

- "Gimme! Gimme! Gimme! (A Man After Midnight)"
- "Super Trouper"
- "Two for the Price of One"
- "Slipping Through My Fingers"
- "Me and I"
- "On and On and On"
- "Knowing Me, Knowing You"
- "Summer Night City"
- "Thank You for the Music"

Six of the nine songs performed on the show have been officially released:

The following songs and videos from this performance appear on DVD 2 of the compilation album The Complete Studio Recordings.:

- "Gimme! Gimme! Gimme! (A Man After Midnight)"
- "Super Trouper"
- "Two for the Price of One"
- "Slipping Through My Fingers"
- "On and On and On"

The following songs appeared on ABBA Live:

- "Gimme! Gimme! Gimme! (A Man After Midnight)"
- "Super Trouper"
- "Two for the Price of One"
- "On and On and On"

The following songs appeared on the Thank You for the Music box set:

- "Slipping Through My Fingers"
- "Me and I"
