= Like an Angel Passing Through My Room =

1981 song by ABBA

Song by ABBA

from the album The Visitors
- Released: 30 November 1981
- Recorded: 26 May – 14 November 1981
- Genre: Art pop; synthpop; acoustic
- Label: Polar
- Songwriters: Benny Andersson; Björn Ulvaeus
- Producers: Benny Andersson; Björn Ulvaeus

Audio video
- "Like an Angel Passing Through My Room" on YouTube

"Like an Angel Passing Through My Room" is the closing track on ABBA's 1981 album The Visitors. It was written by Benny Andersson and Björn Ulvaeus. It was sung by Anni-Frid Lyngstad foremost, and by Agnetha Fältskog in backing vocals.

== History ==
Work began on this track on 26 May 1981 in Polar Music Studios. The first demo recording of the melody was made with Björn Ulvaeus singing a lyric with the title "Twinkle, Twinkle". Then the track was given the title "Another Morning Without You". In later recording sessions it was re-titled "An Angel Walked Through My Room", "An Angel's Passing Through My Room". At one point the song was turned into a disco track but this idea was eventually abandoned as the group felt it sounded too similar to "Lay All Your Love on Me". Initially the track featured vocal parts from both Agnetha Fältskog and Anni-Frid Lyngstad but the final version of the song featured Anni-Frid as soloist. It is notable as being the only ABBA song to feature just one vocalist.

Unlike many other ABBA songs, the final mix of the track was sparsely produced – the entire track consisting of the soloist's treated vocals, synthesized strings, and a music box melody (also synthesized). The sound of a ticking clock, also heard throughout the track, was produced by Andersson's MiniMoog.

The designer of the album sleeve for The Visitors, Rune Söderqvist, was partly inspired by this song's theme when he conceived the idea of photographing the group standing before Julius Kronberg's painting of an angelic-looking Eros.

In 2011, BBC Radio 4 in the UK broadcast a drama documentary, Like An Angel Passing Through My Room. It featured a rare interview with Frida talking about her life and the song. The piece was a meditation on being a fan, love and loss through the prism of pop music.

=== From a Twinkling Star to a Passing Angel ===
On 23 April 2012 a Deluxe version of The Visitors was released. One of its bonus tracks was a demo medley of "Like an Angel Passing Through My Room" called "From a Twinkling Star to a Passing Angel" put together by Benny Andersson, who feels that the song is one of the best that he and Björn wrote during the ABBA years, but is uncertain whether the final version is the ultimate one. His view is shared by Agnetha Fältskog who described listening to the song as waiting for something that never comes. The compilation showed the experimentation of ABBA with the track, ranging from a full-tempo version (featuring the famous ABBA harmonies) that was later abandoned because of the similarity mentioned above, to a rather sober synthesized version close to the version that was eventually released. Early lyrics resembled the traditional "Twinkle Twinkle Little Star", although these lyrics were meant as temporary to accompany the melody.
