= Thank You for the Music (album) =

Thank You for the Music: A Collection of Love Songs

Compilation album by ABBA
- Released: 11 November 1983
- Recorded: August 1976–August 1982
- Genre: Pop
- Length: 62:56
- Label: Epic
- Producer: Benny Andersson; Björn Ulvaeus

ABBA chronology
| The Singles: The First Ten Years (1982) | Thank You for the Music: A Collection of Love Songs (1983) | ABBA Live (1986) |

Singles from Thank You for the Music: A Collection of Love Songs
- 1. "Thank You for the Music" Released: 4 November 1983 (UK)

Thank You for the Music (subtitled A Collection of Love Songs) is a compilation album by the Swedish recording group ABBA. It was released on 11 November 1983, exclusively to the United Kingdom and Ireland, via Epic Records, the group's British distributor. The compilation features fourteen of the group's songs. The Spanish version of "Fernando" is featured on the compilation, which marked its first time released in the United Kingdom. The group had effectively broken up for nearly a year when the compilation was released.

Seen as an unnecessary release, Thank You for the Music broke ABBA's streak of eight consecutive British number one albums, beginning with Greatest Hits in 1976 and ending with The Singles: The First Ten Years in 1982; it reached number 17 on the UK Albums Chart. Despite under-performing, it was still certified Gold by the BPI for sales of over 100,000 units. "Thank You for the Music", originally released in 1978 as a double A-side single with "Eagle" was reissued as a single, peaking at number 33 on the UK Singles Chart.

Thank You for the Music was later deleted following releases of later compilations.

== Promotion ==
For the release, CBS/Epic promoted Thank You for the Music with television advertising in London, and window displays and posters.

== Singles ==
"Thank You for the Music" was the compilation's only single, released on 4 November 1983, with a shaped picture disc released on 2 December. Tony Jasper of Music Week reviewed the reissued single with a mixed reception, "Oldie prised from vaults of [ABBA] who have sadly let themselves go to musical nothingness. Catchy interesting but could be either top 10 or virtually ignored." Jools Holland, in a guest review for Smash Hits, wrote that although "[Britain doesn't] think much of the Swedes, we still give the record a sporting chance." Charles Shaar Murray of NME described the track as "absolutely revolting" and "terrifying horrible", and thought the release was unnecessary. It was a minor hit, charting within the top forty in Ireland, the Netherlands, and the United Kingdom. In the lattermost country, it peaked at number 33 on the UK Singles Chart, marking ABBA's second lowest charting single, only above the No. 38 peak of "I Do, I Do, I Do, I Do, I Do".

== Critical reception ==
Professional ratings
Review scores
| Source | Rating |
|---|---|
| Allmusic | 3/5 stars |

Jim Reid for Record Mirror panned the release of Thank You for the Music, saying it did ABBA "no justice" and that it "[reeks] of record company cash in."

== Track listing ==
All tracks are written by Benny Andersson and Björn Ulvaeus, except where noted.

Side one
| No. | Title | Writer(s) | Original album | Length |
|---|---|---|---|---|
| 1. | "My Love, My Life" | Andersson; Stig Anderson; Ulvaeus | Arrival | 3:52 |
| 2. | "I Wonder (Departure)" | Andersson; Anderson; Ulvaeus | ABBA: The Album | 4:38 |
| 3. | "Happy New Year" | | Super Trouper | 4:23 |
| 4. | "Slipping Through My Fingers" | | The Visitors | 3:51 |
| 5. | "Fernando" (Spanish version) | Andersson; Anderson; Ulvaeus; Buddy McCluskey; Mary McCluskey | Gracias Por La Música | 4:15 |
| 6. | "One Man, One Woman" | | ABBA: The Album | 4:35 |
| 7. | "Eagle" | | ABBA: The Album | 5:51 |

Side two
| No. | Title | Original album | Length |
|---|---|---|---|
| 1. | "I Have a Dream" | Voulez-Vous | 4:44 |
| 2. | "Our Last Summer" | Super Trouper | 4:23 |
| 3. | "The Day Before You Came" | The Singles: The First Ten Years | 5:51 |
| 4. | "Chiquitita" | Voulez-Vous | 5:26 |
| 5. | "Should I Laugh or Cry" | B-side of "One of Us" and "When All Is Said and Done" | 4:26 |
| 6. | "The Way Old Friends Do" (Live) | Super Trouper | 2:53 |
| 7. | "Thank You for the Music" | ABBA: The Album | 3:48 |
| Total length: | | | 62:56 |

== Charts ==
| Chart (1983) | Peak position |
|---|---|
| UK Albums (OCC) | 17 |

== Certifications ==
| Region | Certification | Certified units/sales |
|---|---|---|
| United Kingdom (BPI) | Gold | 100,000^{^} |
^{^} Shipments figures based on certification alone.
