= Two for the Price of One =

Two for the Price of One or 2 for the Price of 1 may represent:

- Buy one get one free, a sales promotion
- "Two for the Price of One (ABBA song)", a song on the album The Visitors (ABBA album)
- Two for the Price of One, by Tony Kenrick, the basis of the film Nobody's Perfekt
- 2 for the Price of 1 (The Price Is Right), a game on the game show The Price is Right
- Two for the Price of One, an album by Larry Williams and Johnny Watson
