= I Let the Music Speak =

Song by ABBA

from the album The Visitors
- Released: November 30, 1981
- Genre: Pop
- Length: 5:20
- Songwriters: Benny Andersson, Björn Ulvaeus
- Producers: Benny Andersson, Björn Ulvaeus

Audio video
- "I Let the Music Speak" on YouTube

"I Let the Music Speak" is a song by ABBA, featured as the first track to side two of their 1981 album The Visitors. It is the fifth-longest ABBA track, after "Eagle", "The Day Before You Came", "The Visitors", and "Chiquitita".

== Synopsis ==
Billboard said the song "is the singer's personal acknowledgement of the wondrous transcendental power and sweep of music". Abba - Uncensored on the Record says the song "suggest[s] that after all the good times and bad times, music will never let you down".

== Composition ==
The song opens with a "rolling and wishful piano figure", and includes a "warm synth string ensemble", focusing on the alto and tenor sections. The woodwind filigree is courtesy of flautist Jan Kling. The song also has an acoustic guitar starting in the second verse, which blend with Benny's grand piano, which is the "leading voice in the rousing musings of the chorus". The melodic design is quite angular - following the recitative medium. Frida's main vocals are assisted by Agnetha's "pouncing falsetto grabs" prior to the chorus.

== Critical reception ==
Abba - Uncensored on the Record notes the song has a "theatrical presentation" and doesn't sound like a pop song. The song was listed among 4 others as one of the "best cuts" of the album The Visitors. Managing Information, Volume 7, Issues 6-10 explains "Songs such as I Let the Music Speak', and the album's title-track [The Visitors] were a major break from their traditional style." ABBA:Let the music speak describes the song as a "thespian ear-grabber" and "a rich tapestry of rhythmic contemplation, deftly easing from waltz to march time and back again".

== Legacy ==
Benny and Bjorn explained that "I Let the Music Speak" was an early example of their foray into musicals: "Songs like "Thank You for the Music" or "I Let the Music Speak" had a theatrical quality. You could see "Chess" as a development from what we did with Abba".

I Let The Music Speak has lent its name to various media, including a 12-song album tribute to the songs of Benny and Bjorn by Anne Sofie von Otter, and also a book about ABBA entitled ABBA: Let The Music Speak.

The opening line "I'm hearing images, I'm seeing songs, no poet has ever painted" was included as the quote at the beginning of the chapter entitled "'I let the music speak': cross domain application for a cognitive model of musical learning'".
