= Thank You for the Music (disambiguation) =

"Thank You for the Music "is a song by ABBA.

Other uses may include:

- Thank You for the Music (album), a 1983 ABBA compilation released in the UK and Ireland
- Thank You for the Music (box set), a 1994 ABBA box set
