= Pauline Ahlberg =

Swedish author

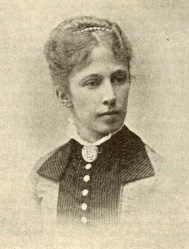
- Portrait of the author
- Born: 4 December 1851; Stockholm, Sweden
- Died: 15 April 1896 (aged 45); Malmö, Sweden
- Occupation: author
- Spouse: Julius Kronberg

Henriette Elisabeth Pauline Christine Ahlberg (4 December 1851 – 15 April 1896) was a Swedish author and critic.

== Biography ==
Born in 1851 to Johan Daniel Ahlberg, a doctor, and Louise Henriette Moll, a member of prominent merchant family of Dutch origins, Pauline Ahlberg was the youngest of six siblings. Ahlberg was educated at the Hammarstedtska skolan, Sweden's foremost girls-school. In her youth she was widely travelled, spending time in both Germany and France, where she learned the local language.

During her travels in France she met the French writer Victor Hugo, about whom she later wrote a book entitled Victor Hugo och det nya Frankrikeelhet (Victor Hugo and the new France). Ahlberg subsequently wrote another book about the French Romantic poet Alfred de Vigny entitled En romantisk skaldebild : Alfred de Vigny (A Romantic Poetry: Alfred de Vigny). In Paris she socialized with the Finnish artist Albert Edelfelt and introduced him to philosophical and scientific questions. Ahlberg also treated Edelfelt to Romeo and Juliet which suggests that she harbored more than just friendly feelings for him. She would have liked to stay longer in Paris but was called home by her father.

In July 1882 Ahlberg wrote an article in the French journal La Nouvelle Revue entitled Une Poete du Nord - Henri Ibsen (A Poet of the North - Henry Ibsen) regarding the social plays of Henrik Ibsen. As such Ahlberg was one of the first authors to introduce Ibsen to a French-speaking audience. Ahlberg wrote a further study for La Nouvelle Revue entitled L'art scandinave et finlandais (Scandinavian and Finnish art) in 1883. In August 1883 she began to suffer ill-health whilst living in Rome, but recovered and in Autumn 1883 returned to Sweden and married Julius Kronberg, with whom she settled in Rome. In 1884 she began to suffer further from poor mental health, and her marriage with Kronberg was dissolved. She was then committed to a rest home in Malmö, where she died in 1896.
