= When All Is Said and Done =

Single by ABBA

from the album The Visitors
- B-side: "Should I Laugh or Cry"
- Released: 31 December 1981 (U.S.)
- Recorded: 16–19 March 1981; finished 14 November 1981
- Studio: Polar Studios (Stockholm, Sweden)
- Genre: Pop; Europop
- Length: 3:20
- Label: Atlantic (U.S.)
- Songwriters: Benny Andersson; Björn Ulvaeus
- Producers: Benny Andersson; Björn Ulvaeus

ABBA singles chronology
"One of Us" (1981)	"When All Is Said and Done" (1981)	"Head over Heels" (1982)

Music video
- "When All Is Said and Done" on YouTube

"No Hay a Quien Culpar"
- El Salvador single

"When All Is Said and Done" is a song by the Swedish recording group ABBA, recorded for their eighth studio album The Visitors (1981). Featuring lead vocals by Anni-Frid Lyngstad, the track was released as the second overall single from the album on 31 December 1981. It was released in North America by Atlantic Records as the lead single to The Visitors in place of "One of Us", which had been released in Europe and Australia. The track details the divorce of Lyngstad and Benny Andersson.

The single placed moderately on the charts of North America, where it peaked at number 27 on the US Billboard Hot 100 and did not chart on the Canada RPM Top Singles. However, it placed better rankings on the Adult Contemporary component charts of both countries, peaking at number four in Canada and ten in the United States. Internationally, it charted within the top twenty in Chile while barely made a dent in Australia.

== Background ==
ABBA constituted two married couples who later divorced. Similar to the group's 1980 track, "The Winner Takes It All", which could have been influenced by the split between band members Björn Ulvaeus and Agnetha Fältskog, "When All Is Said and Done" detailed the divorce between Anni-Frid Lyngstad and Benny Andersson.

Written during a time of emotional turmoil, Ulvaeus has admitted that the split between Benny and Frida was at the back of his mind during the songwriting process for "When All Is Said and Done". He sought approval from Benny and Frida before the group began working with the song. When recording began in March 1981, only one month had passed since their separation.

"When All Is Said and Done" saw Frida giving words and emotions detailing all of her sorrow and pain, not only for herself, but for all of those who had been through a separation. The backing track the group had first recorded was completely changed after Frida had laid down her powerful and emotional vocals. As Frida herself later recalled: "All my sadness was captured in that song."

== Composition ==
"When All Is Said and Done" was originally written in the key of D major, with Lyngstad's main vocals ranging from A_{3}–A_{4}.

== Spanish version ==
ABBA also recorded a Spanish version of "When All Is Said and Done" (entitled "No Hay a Quien Culpar"), which was released as a single in Mexico and several South American countries. The Spanish title written by Buddy and Mary McCluskey translates as "There Is No One to Blame". The track was also slightly remixed, for example leaving out the double-tracked snare drum of the original English version and adding new synth overdubs, giving the song a warmer feeling than the original version. The Spanish interpretation reached No. 29 in Mexico.

== Music video ==
In August 1981, a music video was filmed to promote the song, directed by Lasse Hallström. Parts of the video that feature Lyngstad by the sea were filmed in the Stockholm archipelago. The scenes where the other ABBA members appear were filmed in Stockholm. ABBA also filmed a video for "No Hay a Quien Culpar", the Spanish version of the song, in October 1981. This interpretation is an almost exact copy of the English version, the only difference being Frida's new hairstyle. As a result, with parts of the English version of the video being featured in the Spanish clip, "No Hay a Quien Culpar" includes both of Frida's different hairstyles.

== Reception ==
=== Critical reception ===
Billboard called it a "melodic, uptempo track" that has "pretty harmonies and a keen sense of accessible yet polished pop textures." Editor Thomas Gabriel, in Billboard's review for The Visitors, highlighted its "light-as-air childlike" chorus, which he found reminiscent of the vocals featured in The Wizard of Oz. Canadian newspaper The Leader-Post named it one of the two best cuts of the album, calling it a "melodically strong, poignant item dealing with a retrospective couple in their twilight years."

=== Chart reception ===
Although most countries released "One of Us" as the first single from The Visitors in early December 1981, ABBA's American record label, Atlantic Records, instead opted for "When All Is Said and Done", having more faith in it becoming a hit. It was a modest hit for the group in the US, peaking at number 27 on the Billboard Hot 100, becoming the group's 14th and final US top 40 hit to date. The track reached number 10 on the Adult Contemporary chart, giving the group their eighth and final top ten hit, and also charted on the Billboard Dance/Disco chart, reaching number eight. "When All Is Said and Done" also achieved particular success in Canada, peaking at No. 4 on the Adult Contemporary chart in March 1982 (and spending nine weeks on the chart). The single was also released in Australia (with the album track "Soldiers" as the B-side). A minor hit there, the song peaked at number 81.

== Track listings and formats ==
All tracks composed by Benny Andersson, with lyrics by Björn Ulvaeus, except where noted.

American, Canadian, and Brazilian 7-inch single

1. "When All Is Said and Done" – 3:20
2. "Should I Laugh or Cry" – 4:30

Australian and New Zealand 7-inch single

1. "When All Is Said and Done" – 3:20
2. "Soldiers" – 4:38

Mexican 7-inch single

1. "When All Is Said and Done" – 3:17
2. "The Visitors" – 3:29

Salvadorean 7-inch single

1. "No Hay a Quien Culpar" (Andersson, Ulvaeus, Buddy McCluskey, Mary McCluskey) – 3:20
2. "Two for the Price of One" – 3:36

US Spanish 7-inch single

1. "No Hay a Quien Culpar" (Andersson, Ulvaeus, B. McCluskey, M. McCluskey)
2. "Reina Danzante" (Andersson, Ulvaeus, B. McCluskey, M. McCluskey)

== Charts ==
=== Weekly charts ===
Weekly chart performance for "When All Is Said and Done"
Chart (1982)	Peak position
Australia (Kent Music Report)	81
Canada Adult Contemporary (RPM)	4
Chile (Radio Cooperativa)	15
US Billboard Hot 100	27
US Adult Contemporary (Billboard)	10
US Dance Club Songs (Billboard)	8
US Cash Box Top 100 Singles	31
US Adult Contemporary (Radio & Records)	11
US Record World Singles	31
US A/C (Record World)	13

=== Year-end charts ===
Year-end chart performance for "When All Is Said and Done"
Chart (1982)	Position
US Adult Contemporary (Gavin Report)	59
US Adult Contemporary (Radio & Records)	68

== Mamma Mia! version ==
"When All Is Said and Done" was included in the 2008 film version of the ABBA musical, Mamma Mia!, performed by Sam Carmichael (played by Pierce Brosnan), with one line – "slightly worn but dignified, and not too old for sex" – also sung by Meryl Streep. The song is substantially different from the original release, not only in that it has been reworked into a ballad but also that a new second verse was written by Björn Ulvaeus specifically for the movie soundtrack and added to the song's original lyrics as recorded by ABBA:

"It's been there in my dreams, the scene I see unfold
True at last, flesh and blood, to cherish and to hold
Careless fools will suffer, yes, I know and I confess:
Once I lost my way when something good had just begun
Lesson learned – it's history – when all is said and done"

In the context of the movie, the lyrics also take on an entirely different meaning: as opposed to the original which describes a couple going their separate ways, it portrays two lovers finding their way back to each other and rekindling their romance. The song is sung when Sam decides to propose to Donna after he confesses to marrying another woman and then divorcing her; Donna ultimately accepts.
