= Should I Laugh or Cry =

Song by ABBA

from the album Thank You for the Music and The Visitors (re-issue)
- A-side: "One of Us"
- Released: 30 November 1981
- Genre: Synth-pop
- Length: 4:27
- Label: Polar
- Songwriters: Benny Andersson; Björn Ulvaeus
- Producers: Benny Andersson; Björn Ulvaeus

Audio video
- "Should I Laugh or Cry" on YouTube

"Should I Laugh or Cry" is a song by Swedish pop group ABBA, written and produced by Benny Andersson and Björn Ulvaeus. It features Anni-Frid Lyngstad on lead vocals. It was released as the B-side for "One of Us" and 'When All Is Said and Done" from The Visitors (1981), their eighth studio album. The track first featured on an album in 1983 with the release of the British-exclusive Thank You for the Music compilation. "Should I Laugh or Cry" originally did not make it to the track listing of The Visitors, although it was included in the remastered version of the album re-issued in 1997 and 2001.

== Synopsis ==
ABBA - Uncensored on the Record says: "Should I Laugh or Cry" is "a rather bitter song" about the end of a relationship. ABBA: Let the Music Speak explains it as "reflect[ing] a failing relationship's pre-emptive strikes of anger and contemplation". The narrator is the "emotionally afflicted party", both "volatile and pitiless" in the verses yet "tender and forgiving" in the choruses. There is a sense that this is the last time the narrator will put up with this situation.

== Composition ==
The chorus harmonies are "intricate" and "close-knit". Agnetha's "dreamy echo vocal" adds a sense of sadness to Frida's "fiery sentiments". The song has "deep percusive strikes" and also a "defiant electric glissando" in the verses, and a "lilting acoustic" in the chorus.

== Release ==
While originally recorded on 4 September 1981 during sessions for the album The Visitors, "Should I Laugh or Cry" was ultimately not included. However, the song is included on Thank You for the Music (1983) and as a bonus track on remastered reissues of The Visitors.
