= Two for the Price of One (ABBA song) =

Song by ABBA

from the album The Visitors
- Released: September 1981
- Genre: Soft rock
- Length: 3:36
- Songwriters: Benny Andersson, Björn Ulvaeus
- Producers: Benny Andersson, Björn Ulvaeus

Audio video
- "Two for the Price of One" on YouTube

"Two for the Price of One" is a song recorded by Swedish pop group ABBA, featured on their 1981 album The Visitors. The song also appears on the 1986 album ABBA Live.

== Synopsis ==
The Leader-Post explains that the song is about "our pathetic love-starved hero answering an ad for the girl of his dreams". The song's lyrics describe a man with a low-status job who answers a personal ad for two women seeking a threesome: the final punchline reveals that one of the women is the other one’s mother.

== Composition ==
Abba's Abba Gold describes it as the "obligatory Bjorn-sung track".

== Critical reception ==
ABBA - Uncensored on the Record says that "Two for the Price of One" is an "extraordinary song" and that it, along with another song from the album, "attracted some interest". Abba's Abba Gold likened it to "Electric Light Orchestra doing an operetta, with superb multi-layered vocals on the chorus". Keith Tuber of Orange Coast Magazine describes the song as his favourite on the album, describing it as a "humorous, clever ditty with a twist ending", and likens it to Rupert Holmes' "Escape (The Piña Colada Song)".

The Leader-Post describes "Two for the Price of One" as a "novelty number", and a "witty little tune". Along with "When All Is Said and Done", he said it is one of two songs worth mentioning in the review. L.A. Times talks about the album's melancholy vibe, noting that "even the album's two lighthearted cuts - "Two for the Price of One" and "Head over Heels" - are about out-of-synch relationships."

Only Solitaire says "the Bjorn-sung "Two for the Price of One" is an absolute lyrical nadir with a banal pop melody that could have easily made it onto Ring Ring. In regard to the song's inclusion on ABBA's live album, it says "if you're gonna have one really really bad ABBA song on a live album, at least make it something goofy from the early days, like "King Kong" or "Nina Pretty Ballerina"! At least they were having fun with these ones."

Writing for Pitchfork on the 2012 deluxe reissue of The Visitors, Tom Ewing was also dismissive of the track, calling it "a hokey story of a failed threesome [that] calls back to their earliest, goofiest records".
