= The Visitors (ABBA album) =

1981 studio album by ABBA

Studio album by ABBA
- Released: 30 November 1981
- Recorded: 16 March – 14 November 1981
- Studios: Polar, Stockholm
- Genre: Pop
- Length: 37:39
- Labels: Polar; Epic (1981 UK release)
- Producers: Benny Andersson; Björn Ulvaeus

ABBA chronology
Super Trouper (1980)	The Visitors (1981)	The Singles: The First Ten Years (1982)

Singles from The Visitors
- 1. "One of Us" Released: 7 December 1981; 2. "When All Is Said and Done" Released: 31 December 1981; 3. "Head Over Heels" Released: 5 February 1982; 4. "The Visitors" Released: 5 April 1982

Professional ratings
Review scores
Source	Rating
AllMusic	4/5 stars
Blender	5/5 stars
The Daily Vault	B+
The Encyclopedia of Popular Music	3/5 stars
Ondarock	7.5/10
Pitchfork	8.6/10
Record Mirror	2/5 stars
The Rolling Stone Album Guide	4/5 stars
Smash Hits	8/10

The Visitors is the eighth studio album by the Swedish pop group ABBA. It was released on 30 November 1981.

With The Visitors, ABBA took several steps away from the "lighter" pop music they had recorded previously and the album is often regarded as a more complex and mature effort. The opening track, "The Visitors", with its ominous synthesizer sounds and the distinctive lead vocal by Frida, announced a change in musical style. With Benny and Frida going their separate ways, the pain of splitting up was explored yet again in "When All Is Said and Done". The major hit single on the album, "One of Us", also depicted the end of a love story. Elsewhere there were Cold War themes—highly topical at the time—and further songs of isolation and regret.

The Visitors was one of the first albums to be digitally recorded and mixed. The Visitors was also one of the earliest to be manufactured commercially on compact disc, it was released after 52nd Street by Billy Joel (the first available in this format). The Visitors has been reissued in digitally remastered form four times—first in 1997, then in 2001, again in 2005 as part of The Complete Studio Recordings box set and most recently in 2012, as part of the "Deluxe Edition" series.

For four decades, The Visitors stood as ABBA's last studio album, until the release of their 2021 album, Voyage.

== Recording and release ==
Recording began on what was to become ABBA's eighth studio album on 16 March 1981. By this time, tensions in ABBA had heightened. Björn Ulvaeus and Agnetha Fältskog had divorced in July 1980, while the band's other couple, Benny Andersson and Anni-Frid Lyngstad, announced their divorce in February 1981, adding strain to the musical partnership. Ulvaeus mentioned in retrospect that the sessions were troubled, noting, "It could be frosty sometimes." Lyngstad also commented that they were beginning to be tired of working together.

The members of ABBA and their personnel have memories of the recording sessions for this album being rather difficult. To begin with, their sound engineer Michael Tretow had to become accustomed to using the new 32-track digital recorder that had been purchased for Polar Music Studios. He said, "Digital recording...cut out all the hiss, but it also meant that sounds were sharply cut off below a certain level. The sound simply became too clean, so I had to find ways of compensating for that". The first three tracks for the album had already been recorded using analogue tape and therefore Tretow had to transfer all subsequent tracks from digital to analogue and back again to avoid a difference in quality.

On its release, The Visitors reached the top of the charts in a number of territories but was not as successful as the band's previous albums.

On 1 December 2023, The Visitors was reissued as a multi-format release for its delayed 40th anniversary celebration. It included: a double-LP half-speed mastered version of the album, done by Miles Showell at Abbey Road Studios, pressed on 45 rpm 180 g black vinyl; a colored vinyl 7-inch singles box set of "Head Over Heels", "One of Us", "The Day Before You Came", and "Under Attack" (the latter two being from The Singles: The First Ten Years); and individual 7" picture discs of these four singles.

== Deluxe edition ==
The Visitors was reissued on 23 April 2012, as a CD and DVD deluxe edition set. The first disc consisted of a remastered version of the original album, with seven bonus tracks. Featured among them were: a version of "Should I Laugh or Cry" with a brief count-in, from the original United Kingdom and South African 7" release; "I Am the City", recorded in 1982 and released in 1993, on More ABBA Gold: More ABBA Hits; and, particularly, the 9-minute demo medley "From a Twinkling Star to a Passing Angel". This collection of demos, put together by Benny Andersson, showcased the evolution of "Like an Angel Passing Through My Room", offered insights into ABBA's recording process, and was, at the time, the first release of unheard archive material since 1994's Thank You for the Music box set.

The second disc included the following television material: the performances of "Two for the Price of One" and "Slipping Through My Fingers" from the Dick Cavett Meets ABBA special; the original promo clip of "When All Is Said and Done"; two promotional appearances by the band, from The Late, Late Breakfast Show (BBC) and Nöjesmaskinen (SVT), titled "ABBA In London, November 1982" and "ABBA In Stockholm, November 1982", respectively; four television commercials: two for The Visitors and two for The Singles: The First Ten Years; and the "International Sleeve Gallery". The set also came with a 24-page booklet with an essay on the making of the album.

Pitchfork reviewed this deluxe reissue on 18 May 2012, and gave it an 8.6 rating, saying "even as the band's commercial star faded and its professional relationships quietly unravelled, they were perfectionists. ABBA's music on The Visitors is more pristine and ambitious than it had ever been, its themes darker, its personal politics more tangled". An April 2012 review by The Arts Desk said that "The Visitors is not their best, but it is their most interesting [album], pointing to where Björn Ulvaeus and Benny Andersson would go next".

== Album cover ==
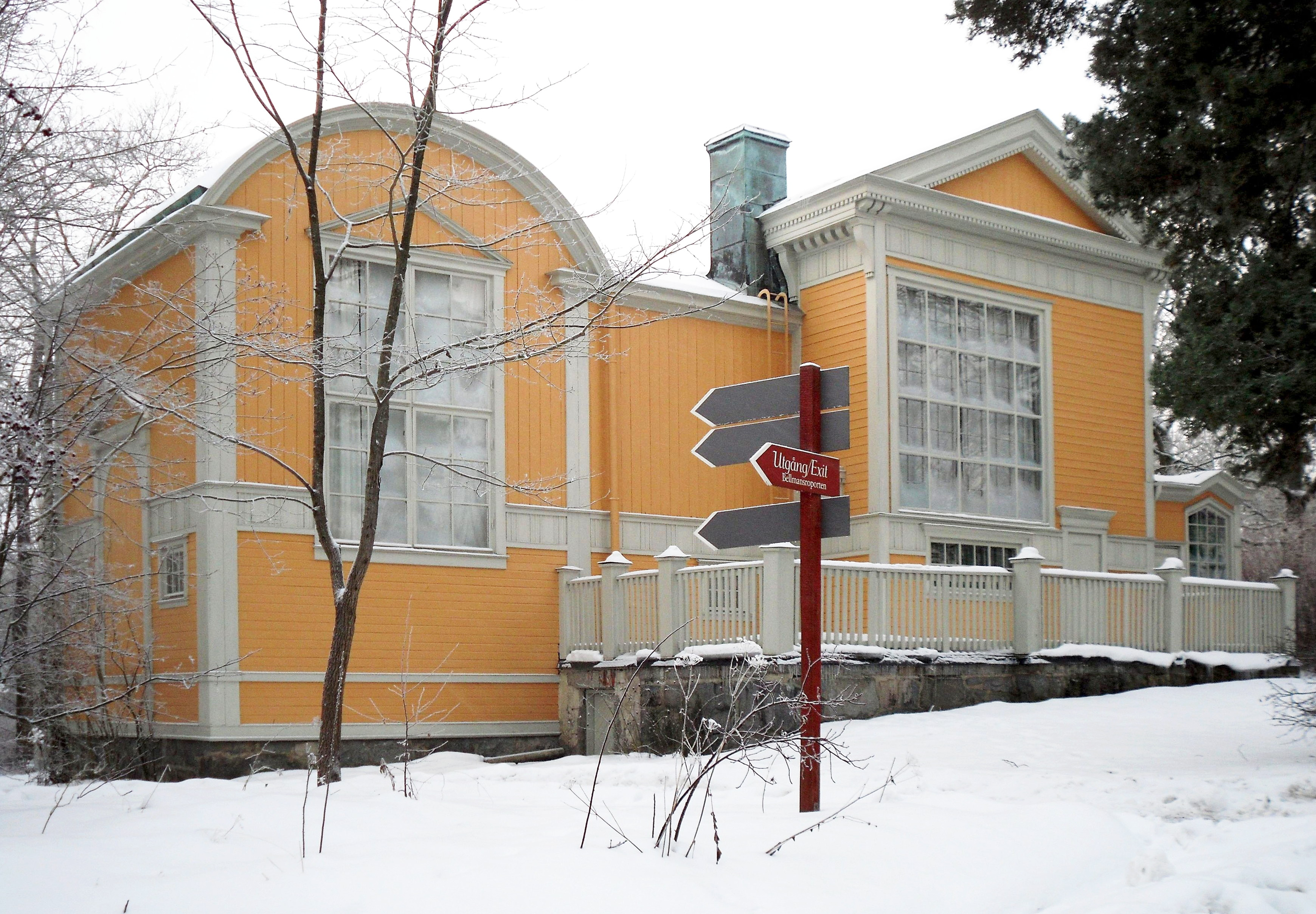
The studio of Julius Kronberg at Skansen in Stockholm.

Rune Söderqvist, who had worked with the band on previous designs, was put in charge of the artwork, and came up with an "angel" concept that was based on the album's title and its closing track "Like an Angel Passing Through My Room". The next step was to develop this concept into an idea. As he recalled, "I knew that the painter Julius Kronberg had painted a lot of angels in his time... so I located his studio – at the Skansen park [in Stockholm] – which contained several of his paintings". With photographer Lasse Larsson's help, Söderqvist gathered the band in Kronberg's atelier (in a room with paintings of Eros) and photographed them with a giant painting of an angel as the backdrop.

In the album cover, the group members are positioned apart and appear to be waiting solemnly in the shadows. It was the first time the members were depicted as separate individuals rather than a close-knit group, conveying ABBA's general sense of fatigue.

Julius Kronberg's Atelje (atelier), where the album cover's photo-shoot took place, is located in Skansen Park, Stockholm.

== Track listing ==
All tracks are written by Benny Andersson and Björn Ulvaeus.

Side one
No.	Title	Length
1.	"The Visitors"	5:49
2.	"Head Over Heels"	3:45
3.	"When All Is Said and Done"	3:20
4.	"Soldiers"	4:38

Side two
No.	Title	Length
1.	"I Let the Music Speak"	5:20
2.	"One of Us"	3:55
3.	"Two for the Price of One"	3:36
4.	"Slipping Through My Fingers"	3:51
5.	"Like an Angel Passing Through My Room"	3:25
Total length:		37:39

=== Deluxe edition ===
Released on 12 April 2012. The tracks "No hay a quien culpar" and "Se me está escapando" (the Spanish versions of "When All Is Said and Done" and "Slipping Through My Fingers", respectively), featured on the Spanish and Latin American versions of the album, were not included on this reissue. Instead, they could be found on The Complete Studio Recordings and the 2014 deluxe edition of Gracias Por La Música.

All tracks are written by Benny Andersson and Björn Ulvaeus.

Bonus tracks
No.	Title	Length
1.	"Should I Laugh or Cry" (B-side of "One of Us" and "When All Is Said and Done")	4:32
2.	"I Am the City" (first released on More ABBA Gold: More ABBA Hits)	4:04
3.	"You Owe Me One" (B-side of "Under Attack")	3:30
4.	"Cassandra" (B-side of "The Day Before You Came")	4:52
5.	"Under Attack" (from The Singles: The First Ten Years)	3:47
6.	"The Day Before You Came" (from The Singles: The First Ten Years)	5:49

Extra bonus track
No.	Title	Length
1.	"From a Twinkling Star to a Passing Angel" (demos; demo medley of "Like an Angel Passing Through My Room")	9:07

== Personnel ==
Adapted from the album's liner notes.

ABBA

- Anni-Frid Lyngstad – lead vocals (1, 3, 5, 9), backing vocals
- Agnetha Fältskog – lead vocals (2, 4, 6, 8), backing vocals
- Björn Ulvaeus – acoustic guitars, lead vocals (7), backing vocals
- Benny Andersson – keyboards, synthesizers, backing vocals

Additional personnel

- Ola Brunkert – drums
- Per Lindvall – drums (1, 4)
- Åke Sundqvist – percussion
- Rutger Gunnarsson – bass guitar
- Lasse Wellander – electric guitar, acoustic guitar
- Jan Kling – flute (5), clarinet (5)
- The Three Boys – mandolins (6)

Production

- Benny Andersson; Björn Ulvaeus – producers, arrangers
- Michael B. Tretow – engineer
- Rune Söderqvist – album design
- Lars Larsson – photography (at Julius Kronbergs Atelje, Skansen, Stockholm)

== Charts ==
=== Weekly charts ===
Initial weekly chart performance for The Visitors
Chart (1981–82)	Peak position
Argentinian Albums (CAPIF)	5
Australian Albums (Kent Music Report)	22
Austrian Albums (Ö3 Austria)	3
Belgian Albums (HUMO)	1
Canada Top Albums/CDs (RPM)	18
Dutch Albums (Album Top 100)	1
Finnish Albums (Suomen virallinen lista)	2
German Albums (Offizielle Top 100)	1
Italian Albums (Musica e dischi)	23
Japanese Albums (Oricon)	12
New Zealand Albums (RMNZ)	19
Norwegian Albums (VG-lista)	1
Portuguese Albums (Musica & Son)	1
Spanish Albums (El Gran Musical)	6
Swedish Albums (Sverigetopplistan)	1
UK Albums (Official Charts)	1
US Billboard 200	29
US Top 100 Albums (Cash Box)	43
US The Album Chart (Record World)	37

2010s weekly chart performance for The Visitors
Chart (2012)	Peak position
Belgian Albums (Ultratop Flanders)	185
Dutch Albums (Album Top 100)	55
German Albums (Offizielle Top 100)	75
Scottish Albums (Official Charts)	62
Spanish Albums (Promusicae)	94
Swedish Albums (Sverigetopplistan)	18
Swiss Albums (Schweizer Hitparade)	93
UK Albums (Official Charts)	62

2020s weekly chart performance for The Visitors
Chart (2021–2022)	Peak position
Scottish Albums (Official Charts)	33
Swedish Albums (Sverigetopplistan)	48
UK Album Downloads (Official Charts)	32

=== Year-end charts ===
1981 year-end chart performance for The Visitors
Chart (1981)	Position
Dutch Albums (Album Top 100)	4
UK Albums (OCC)	17

1982 year-end chart performance for The Visitors
Chart (1982)	Position
Canada Top Albums/CDs (RPM)	73
Austrian Albums (Ö3 Austria)	14
German Albums (Offizielle Top 100)	19
Dutch Albums (Album Top 100)	18
UK Albums (OCC)	55

== Certifications and sales ==
Certifications and sales for The Visitors
Region	Certification	Certified units/sales
Australia (ARIA)	Gold	35,000^{^}
Denmark (IFPI Danmark)	Gold	10,000^{‡}
Finland (Musiikkituottajat)	Platinum	66,439
Germany (BVMI)	Platinum	750,000
Hong Kong (IFPI Hong Kong)	Gold	10,000^{*}
Japan	—	128,000
Spain (Promusicae)	Gold	50,000^{^}
Sweden (GLF)	Platinum	290,000
United Kingdom (BPI)	Platinum	300,000^{^}
Summaries
Worldwide	—	5,000,000
^{*} Sales figures based on certification alone.^{^} Shipments figures based on certification alone.^{‡} Sales+streaming figures based on certification alone.
