= Soldiers (ABBA song) =

Song by ABBA

from the album The Visitors
- Released: November 29, 1981
- Recorded: 15 October 1981
- Studio: Polar, Stockholm
- Genre: Europop
- Length: 4:38
- Label: Polar
- Songwriters: Benny Andersson, Björn Ulvaeus
- Producers: Andersson, Ulvaeus

Audio video
- "Soldiers" on YouTube

"Soldiers" is an ABBA song, released on their 1981 album The Visitors. It was first recorded on 15 October 1981 at Polar Studios in Stockholm, under the working title "15:e oktober-låten" ("the 15 October song"). A later working title was "Peasants".

== Synopsis ==
The song is a critique of militarism.

Billboard explains: "emphasizing that although there seems to be so little one can do to prevent the machinations of soldiers and those who control them [...], we must 'not look the other way/taking a chance/cause if the bugler starts to play/we too must dance'". The UK's Daily Telegraph describes the premise of the song as "how warmongers convince themselves they are noble men".

== Composition ==
The entire song rests upon a "simple two-note" statement". The song has a "string-ensemble synth arrangement". Agnetha uses a "subdued yet stoic vocal", and "the chorus vocals, while typically multi-tiered, are somewhat 'murkier' and less liberated in texture".

== Critical reception and analysis ==
ABBA's ABBA Gold describes the song as "bleak-yet-catchy". Billboard notes its "simple yet ominous metaphors that envision impending nuclear holocaust". It goes on to explain: "the offbeat cadence of the drumming holds dark, somber verses and the sing-song quality of the chorus together", and concludes by saying "certainly very few groups can effectively handle a subject as serious as this, and still imbue it with all the qualities of a great pop song". Billboard listed the song under the "Best cuts" section of an album review, along with four other songs from the album. ABBA: Let The Music Speak says the song has an "unsettling caution" and also "heart and humanity". The synths "gently inflame the sense of yearning throughout, driving along a backing track which features ...bass courtesy of Rutger Gunnarsson".
