= Rune Söderqvist =

Swedish graphic designer (1935–2014)

- Born: 27 July 1935
- Died: 27 August 2014 (aged 79)
- Occupations: Graphic designer, art director
- Known for: The ABBA logo and album sleeves

Rune Söderqvist (27 July 1935 – 27 August 2014) was a Swedish graphic designer and art director. He designed the logo of the pop group ABBA, with its reversed "B", and the group's album sleeves from 1976 onwards.

== Career ==
Söderqvist was born on 27 July 1935. He worked in advertising for a number of years and by the 1970s had his own design studio. His work with ABBA began in late 1975, when he designed the sleeve for the Swedish edition of the compilation album Greatest Hits.

The ABBA logo, designed by Söderqvist in 1976

The following year he created the group's logo, in which the first "B" is reversed. His reasoning was that each "B", for Björn and Benny, should be turned towards an "A", for Agnetha and Anni-Frid. According to the design website Creative Bloq, the idea is said to have come up during a photo session for the German magazine Bravo, when Benny Andersson had turned his letter "B" the wrong way round and the photographer Wolfgang "Bubi" Heilemann recommended keeping it.

Söderqvist designed all of ABBA's album sleeves from Arrival (1976) to ABBA Live (1986). He was responsible for the photo session for Arrival, which shows the group in a helicopter. He was also behind the visual design of the group's tours in 1977 and 1979.

For Polar Studios, the recording studio that ABBA opened in Stockholm in 1978, Söderqvist made the cloud panels on the walls. Together with Sune Selander he also built a mechanical "music machine" out of old instruments for the entrance, at the request of Benny Andersson.

After the ABBA years he continued to work as a designer and was also active as an artist. He died on 27 August 2014, after a short illness.
