= ABBA Live =

Live album by ABBA
- Released: 18 August 1986
- Recorded: March 1977; November 1979; April 1981
- Genre: Pop
- Length: 62:42
- Label: Polar (original release); Universal Music
- Producer: Michael B. Tretow (engineered & mixed)

ABBA chronology
Thank You for the Music: A Collection of Love Songs (1983)	ABBA Live (1986)	ABBA Gold: Greatest Hits (1992)

ABBA Live is the first live album by Swedish pop group ABBA, released on 18 August 1986 via Polar Music.

== Background ==
A live album was something that many ABBA fans had demanded for several years. ABBA themselves had toyed with the idea on a couple of occasions, but always decided against it. Finally, four years after the members went their separate ways, a live collection was released after all. The resultant album, ABBA Live, contained recordings from 1977, 1979 and 1981. The tracks were mostly taken from ABBA's concerts at Wembley Arena in London in November 1979, with a few additional songs taken from the tour of Australia in March 1977 and the Dick Cavett Meets ABBA television special, taped in April 1981.

When this LP/CD was released, the band's popularity was at an all-time low and none of the members themselves were involved in the production of the album. Much to the dismay of both music critics and ABBA fans it also had 80's synth drums overdubbed on most tracks, taking away the true live feeling of the performances. Neither did it feature any of the tracks that the band had performed live on their tours but never included on any of their studio albums, such as "I Am an A", "Get on the Carousel", "I'm Still Alive", or the original live versions of the songs from the 1977 mini-musical The Girl with the Golden Hair: "Thank You for the Music", "I Wonder (Departure)" and "I'm a Marionette", all of which had slightly different lyrics and/or musical arrangements to the subsequent studio recordings included on ABBA: The Album. Several tracks had also been heavily edited, in the case of the 1979 live recording of "Does Your Mother Know" by as much as five minutes since it originally was performed on that tour as a medley with "Hole in Your Soul".

ABBA Live was the first ABBA album to be simultaneously released on LP and CD, the CD having three "extra tracks". The album did not perform very well, internationally or domestically, peaking at #49 in Sweden and only staying in the charts for two weeks. It was remastered and rereleased by Polydor/Polar in 1997, but is currently out of print.

== Critical reception ==
Professional ratings
Review scores
Source	Rating
AllMusic	3.5/5 stars
The Rolling Stone Album Guide	3/5 stars

Billboard reviewed ABBA Live favorably, describing it as "essentially a greatest-hits package." Cash Box called it a "mostly satisfying posthumous collection of live performances from one of the best dance music combos."

== Track listing ==
All tracks written by Benny Andersson and Björn Ulvaeus except where noted.

Side one
No.	Title	Writer(s)	Length
1.	"Dancing Queen" (Live at Wembley, November 1979)	Andersson; Stig Anderson; Ulvaeus	3:42
2.	"Take a Chance on Me" (Live at Wembley, November 1979)		4:22
3.	"I Have a Dream" (Live at Wembley, November 1979)		4:23
4.	"Does Your Mother Know" (Live at Wembley, November 1979)		4:09
5.	"Chiquitita" (Live at Wembley, November 1979)		5:21

Side two
No.	Title	Writer(s)	Length
1.	"Thank You for the Music" (Live at Wembley, November 1979)		3:40
2.	"Two for the Price of One" (Live on Dick Cavett Meets ABBA, April 1981)		3:31
3.	"Fernando" (Live in Australia, March 1977)	Andersson; Anderson; Ulvaeus	5:22
4.	"Gimme! Gimme! Gimme! (A Man After Midnight)" (Live on Dick Cavett Meets ABBA, April 1981)		3:17
5.	"Super Trouper" (Live on Dick Cavett Meets ABBA, April 1981)		4:23
6.	"Waterloo" (Live at Wembley, November 1979)	Andersson; Anderson; Ulvaeus	3:34

CD edition bonus tracks
No.	Title	Writer(s)	Length
12.	"Money, Money, Money" (Live in Australia, March 1977)		3:20
13.	"The Name of the Game"/"Eagle" (Live at Wembley, November 1979)	Andersson; Anderson; Ulvaeus / Andersson; Ulvaeus	9:37
14.	"On and On and On" (Live on Dick Cavett Meets ABBA, April 1981)		4:01

== Charts ==
Chart (1986)	Peak position
Dutch Albums (Album Top 100)	47
Swedish Albums (Sverigetopplistan)	49
