= The Visitors (song) =

Single by ABBA

from the album The Visitors
- B-side: "Head Over Heels"
- Released: 5 April 1982
- Recorded: 22 October 1981
- Studio: Polar Studios (Stockholm, Sweden)
- Genre: New wave; electropop; synth-pop; disco
- Length: 5:49
- Label: Polar; Atlantic
- Songwriters: Benny Andersson; Björn Ulvaeus
- Producers: Benny Andersson; Björn Ulvaeus

ABBA singles chronology
| "Head Over Heels" (1982) | "The Visitors" (1982) | "The Day Before You Came" (1982) |

Audio video
- "The Visitors" on YouTube

"The Visitors" (working title "Den första", meaning "The first"), is a song by the Swedish recording group ABBA. It serves as the opening track to their eighth studio album of the same name. Anni-Frid Lyngstad provided the lead vocals to the track. In the inner sleeve of the album, the track is listed as "The Visitors (Crackin' Up)". It was released as the album's fourth and final single on 5 April 1982, only in North America via Atlantic Records. Internationally, the sides were switched, with "Head over Heels" serving as the A-side, and overall third single. "The Visitors" is a new wave protest song against the persecution of political dissidents in the Soviet Union, which ended up getting the album banned from the country.

Due to no promotion, "The Visitors" achieved only minor success in the United States, peaking at number 63 on the Billboard Hot 100. Many critics, retrospectively, have come to name the song as one of the group's finest.

== Meaning ==
The official stated theme is a protest against the persecution of political dissidents in the Soviet Union at the time, as ABBA seemed to put political issues into their lyrics in the final days of the group. Björn Ulvaeus has stated that at the time of release he preferred that the song should have a sense of mystery so did not explain the exact meaning.

In 1982, the album The Visitors was banned in the Soviet Union, possibly due to the band allowing a video of "When All Is Said and Done" to be shown in the United States Information Agency television special, Let Poland Be Poland, along with a spoken message from Ulvaeus and Benny Andersson, broadcast via satellite around the world on 31 January 1982. The show, which also featured Frank Sinatra, Paul McCartney, Orson Welles, Henry Fonda, Margaret Thatcher, and Ronald Reagan, was a public protest against the then-recent imposition of martial law in Poland.

However, ABBA's segment was not included in the broadcast. The official reason given was time constraints. However, in a Rapport interview, Ulvaeus mentioned that their message referenced human rights issues in US-backed dictatorships such as El Salvador and Chile. This has led to speculation that political considerations might have influenced the decision to exclude the segment, although this remains unconfirmed.

== Reception ==
"The Visitors" was released as the album's second (and final) single in the US instead of "Head over Heels," which remained as the B-side.

The single peaked just outside the Top 60 at No. 63 on the singles chart in the U.S., and a double A-sided "The Visitors/When All Is Said and Done" 12" single reached No. 8 on the Billboard dance chart. AllMusic staff reviewer Bruce Eder retrospectively described the song as "a topical song about Soviet dissidents that also manages to be very catchy."

== Personnel ==
- Anni-Frid Lyngstad – lead vocals
- Agnetha Fältskog - backing vocals
- Björn Ulvaeus – guitar, backing vocals
- Benny Andersson – keyboards, synthesizer

== Charts ==
Weekly chart performance for "The Visitors"
| Chart (1982) | Peak position |
|---|---|
| US Billboard Hot 100 | 63 |
| US Cash Box Top 100 | 81 |
