= Head over Heels (ABBA song) =

"Head Over Heels"

Single by ABBA

from the album The Visitors
- B-side: "The Visitors"
- Released: 5 February 1982
- Recorded: 2 September 1981
- Studio: Polar Music Studios
- Genre: Pop; synth-pop; tango
- Length: 3:45
- Label: Polar Music
- Songwriters: Benny Andersson; Björn Ulvaeus
- Producers: Benny Andersson; Björn Ulvaeus

ABBA singles chronology
"When All Is Said and Done" (1981)	"Head Over Heels" (1982)	"The Visitors" (1982)

Music video
- "Head Over Heels" on YouTube

"Head Over Heels" is a song recorded by the Swedish recording group ABBA for their eighth studio album The Visitors. With lead vocals provided by Agnetha Fältskog, it was released as the album's third overall single on 5 February 1982 via Polar Music. Unlike the majority of The Visitors, "Head over Heels" features a more lighthearted sound that is influenced by tango music, and which has a satirical undertone. The song was not released in the United States and Canada, where its B-side, "The Visitors", was chosen instead.

It received mixed reviews from music critics, and was seen as a weaker effort than usual by the group. It was also not a major chart success, reaching the top ten only in Austria, Belgium, and the Netherlands. In the United Kingdom, "Head over Heels" broke the group's record of eighteen consecutive top ten hits, peaking at number 25 on the UK singles chart. The song's music video was the last by the group to be directed by Lasse Hallström.

"Head over Heels" is featured on the compilation More ABBA Gold: More ABBA Hits.

== Background ==
"Head Over Heels", whose working title was "Tango", was written and composed by both Benny Andersson and Björn Ulvaeus. Agnetha Fältskog sang the lead vocals, singing about her "very good friend", played in the music video by Anni-Frid Lyngstad, an overactive high-society woman who rushes through the shops, with her hapless and exhausted husband (played by Ulvaeus) following behind and being forced to carry the shopping bags. The song's video, filmed on 21 January 1982, was the group's final clip directed by long-time collaborator Lasse Hallström, who also cameos as a man the woman bumps into while running around the city.

As with the previous single "One of Us", Epic Records in the UK used a different picture sleeve from the standard one used in most countries. In the United States the single was released with the sides switched, "The Visitors" being the A-side.

The sheet music has been released, and the song has been choreographed for dance numbers.

== Critical reception ==
"Head over Heels" received mixed-to-positive reviews from music reviewers. Record Mirror criticized the single as a "sadly unremarkable effort [...] with a bit of the old quavering vocal." Reviewing for Smash Hits, Red Starr pejoratively described "Head over Heels" as a "singalongtango time for mums and dads" and "not particularly good for [the group]", but still praised it as being "strong enough to sound like you've known it for ages." By contrast, Classic Pop's Felix Rowe, in a retrospective review for The Visitors, positively compared the single to the work of The Human League, "with its bright synth brass stabs, snappy, tight drums and an infectiously groovy bassline." Stefano Fiori for Italian magazine Ondarock described "Head over Heels" as "a sort of synth-tango with a lavish chorus." "Head over Heels" was at number 19 in The Guardian's ranking of the group's UK singles.

== Chart reception ==
"Head Over Heels" was released as the group's popularity was starting to decline, and became ABBA's worst selling single since "Money, Money, Money", six years earlier. It peaked at number 25 on the UK Singles Chart, ending a run of 18 consecutive Top 10 hits (from "SOS" in October 1975 to "One of Us" in December 1981). This 18-hit run had equalled that of The Beatles, who had consecutive Top 10 hits from 1964 (with "A Hard Day's Night") to 1976 (with "Yesterday"), broken by "Back in the U.S.S.R.". Although "Head Over Heels" did experience Top 10 success in Belgium, the Netherlands, Austria and France, by this time, ABBA's chart domination was all but over, and the group effectively disbanded a year later. The song was excluded from their retrospective double LP The Singles: The First Ten Years, which was released in late 1982.

== Music video ==
ABBA filmed a video for Head Over Heels in Stockholm which was directed by Lasse Hallström. It is the group's only music video where the director makes an appearance; Hallström is the pedestrian whom Frida bumps into on the street. The action in the video is taken directly from the text; where Frida portrays a woman who rushes through shops with her tired husband in tow (played by Ulvaeus).

== Personnel ==
- Agnetha Fältskog – lead vocals
- Anni-Frid Lyngstad – backing vocals
- Björn Ulvaeus – guitar
- Benny Andersson – keyboards, synthesizer

== Track listings and formats ==
Standard 7-inch single

1. "Head Over Heels" – 3:45
2. "The Visitors" – 5:49

Mexican 7-inch single

1. "Head Over Heels" (Cabeza sobre talones) – 3:45
2. "No Hay a Quien Culpar" (Spanish version of "When All Is Said and Done") – 3:20

Japanese 7-inch single

1. "Head Over Heels" – 3:45
2. "Lay All Your Love on Me" – 4:34

== Charts ==
=== Weekly charts ===
Weekly chart performance for "Head over Heels"
Chart (1982)	Peak position
Austria (Ö3 Austria Top 40)	8
Belgium (Ultratop 50 Flanders)	3
European Singles (Europarade)	5
Ireland (IRMA)	14
Netherlands (Dutch Top 40)	4
Netherlands (Single Top 100)	1
UK Singles (OCC)	25
West Germany (GfK)	19

=== Year-end charts ===
Year-end chart performance for "Head over Heels"
Chart (1982)	Peak position
Belgium (Ultratop 50 Flanders)	70
Netherlands (Single Top 100)	77
