= Julius Kronberg =

Swedish artist and decorative painter

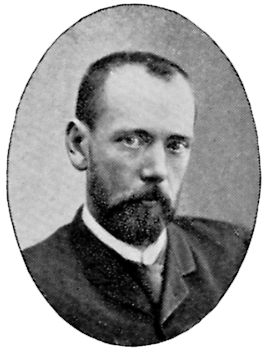
Julius Kronberg, from the Svenskt Porträttgalleri XX

Johan Julius Ferdinand Kronberg (11 December 1850 – 17 October 1921) was a Swedish artist and decorative painter.

== Biography ==
Kronberg was born in Karlskrona, Sweden, in 1850. At 13, he was admitted to the Royal Swedish Academy of Fine Arts. In 1870, he was awarded a gold medal for his portrayal of Gustav Vasa receiving a new translation of the Bible (used on a postage stamp in 1941). He studied with Johan Christoffer Boklund, a history painter who had a major influence on his style and, for a short time, Johan Fredrik Höckert. A travel scholarship in 1873 enabled him to visit Copenhagen, Düsseldorf, and Paris.

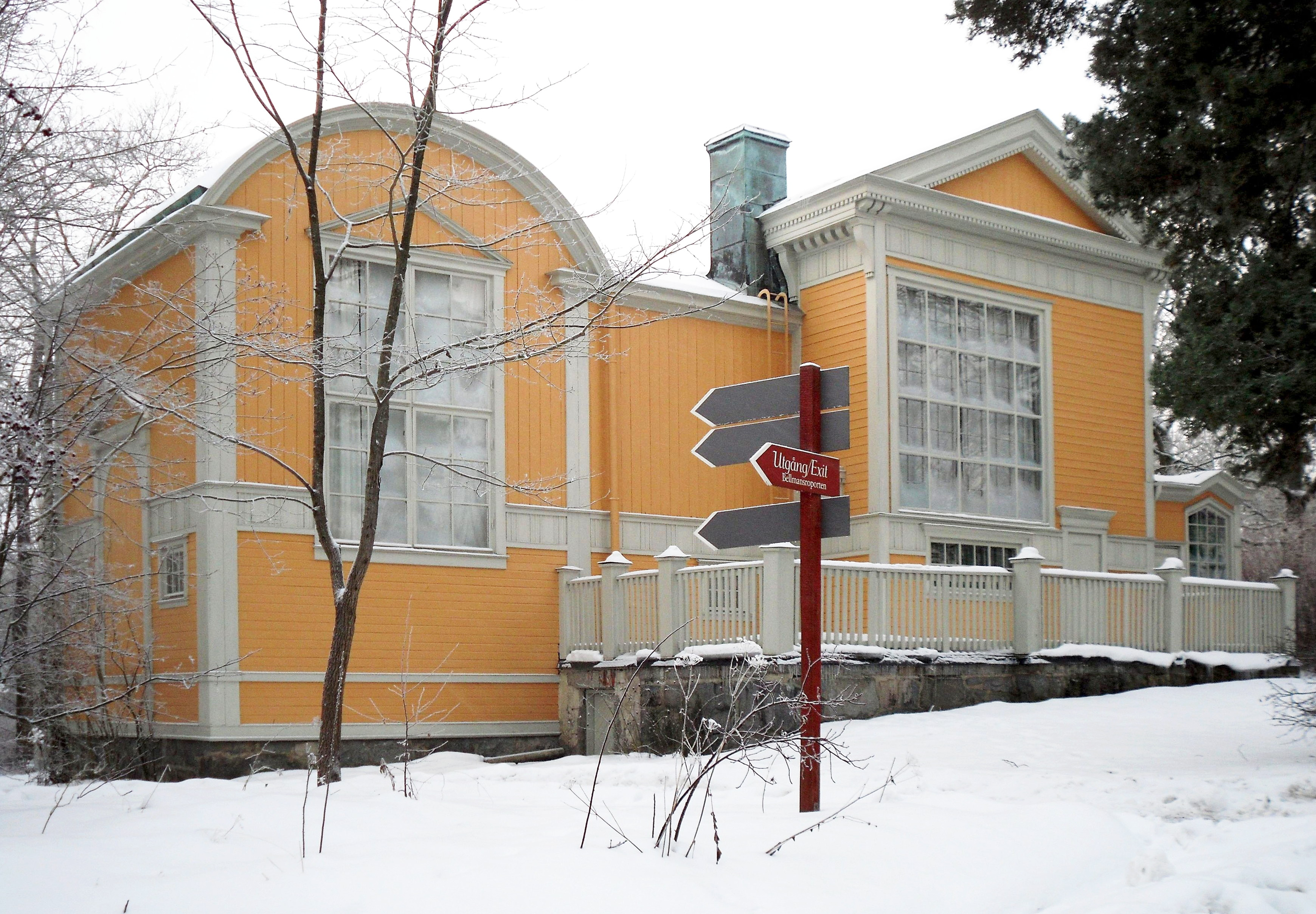
His reconstructed studio at Skansen

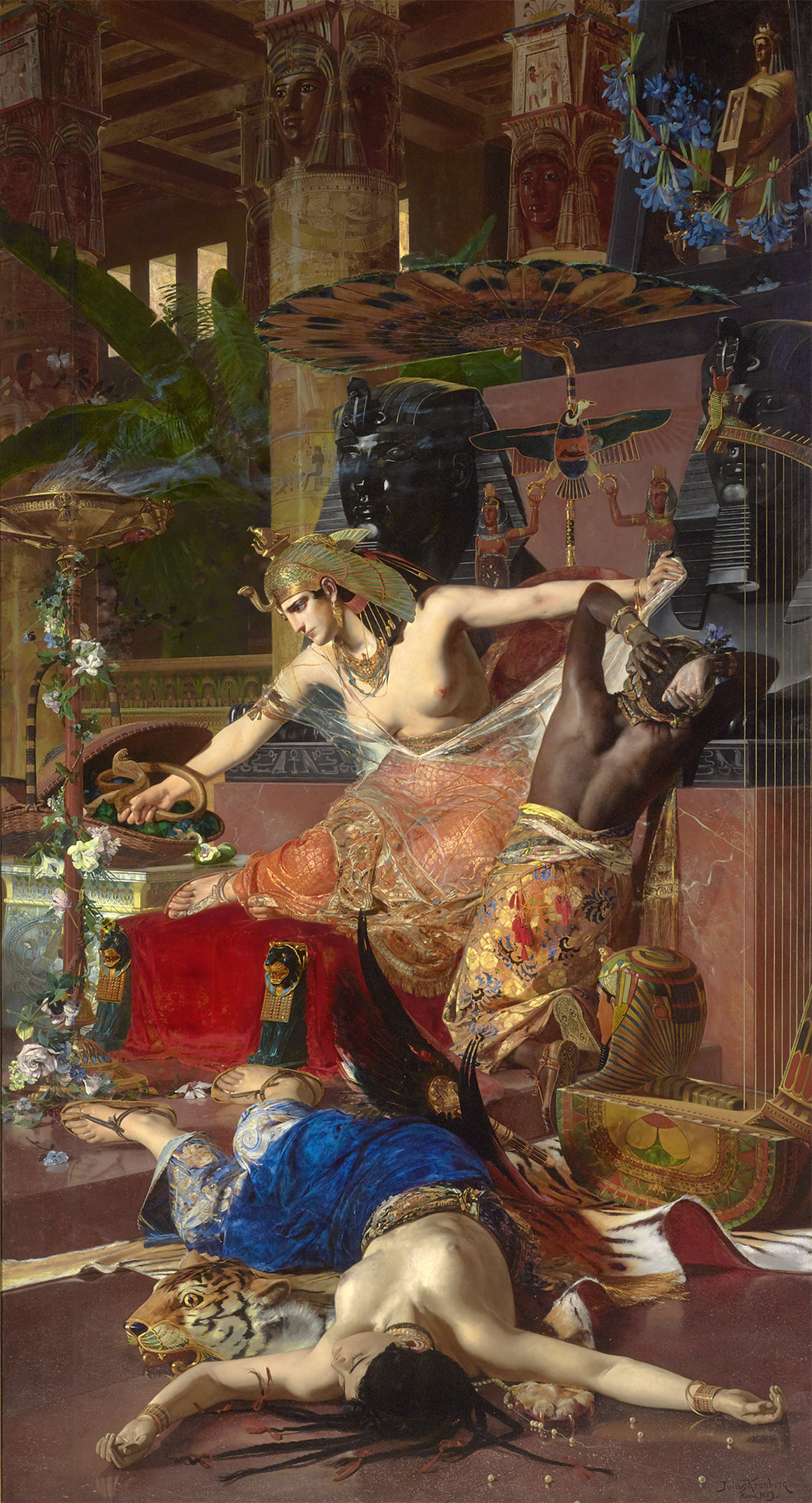
Cleopatra by Julius Kronberg, 1883

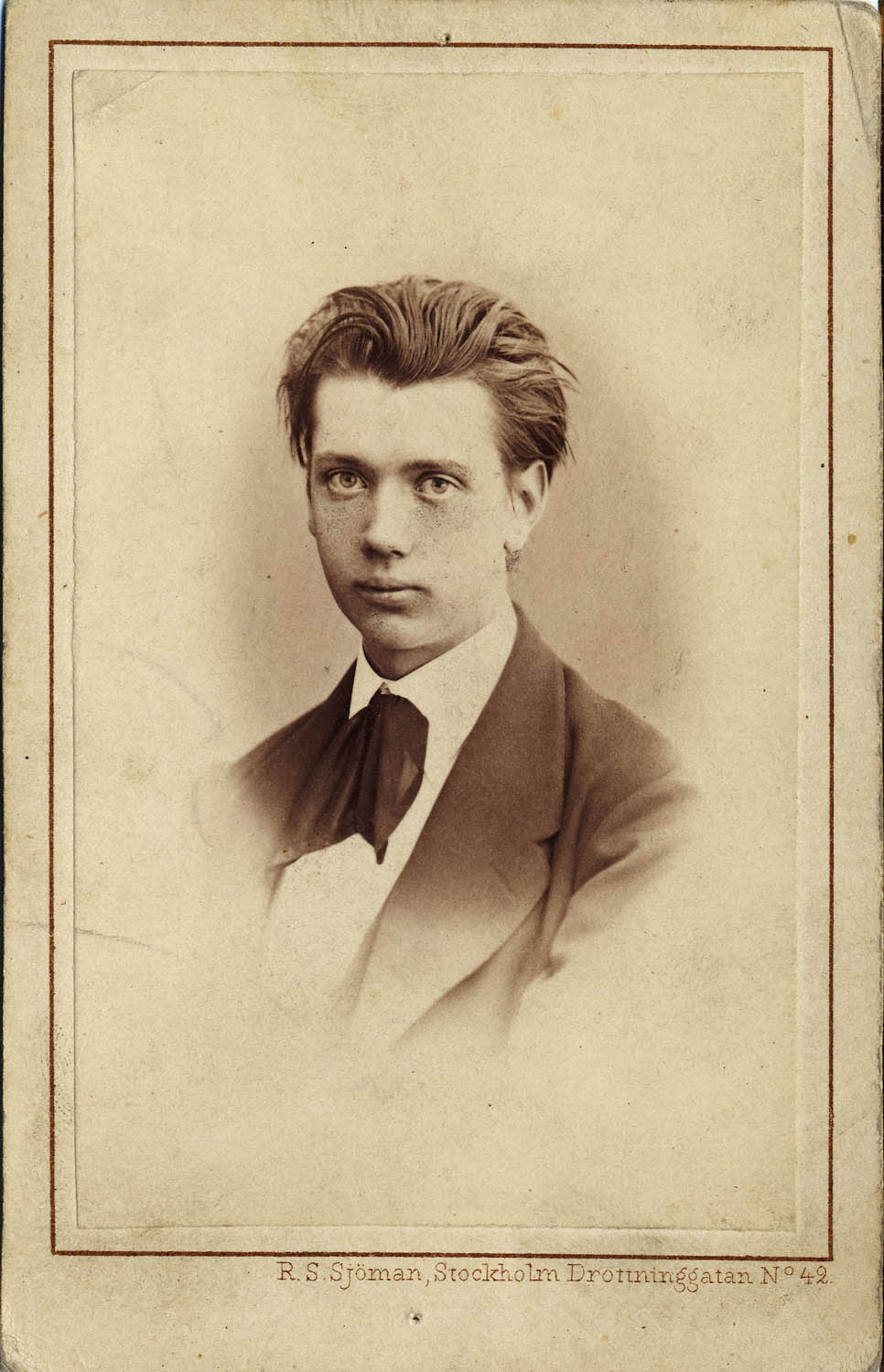
Julius Kronberg in 1869

After a short stay in Venice, he spent considerable time in Munich. There he became interested in decorative painting and was exposed to the work of Hans Makart, which left a strong impression on him. In 1876, his painting, "Nymph and Faun", was praised by August Strindberg and led to his becoming an "agré" (a type of member candidate) at the Royal Academy.

He settled in Rome in 1877 and lightened his palette, somewhat after the style of Giovanni Battista Tiepolo. Upon returning to Stockholm in 1889, he set up a studio in Norra Djurgården and specialized in architectural painting. His motifs were usually taken from mythology or the Bible, as well as works by Shakespeare.

Among his best-known works are three ceiling paintings in the west staircase of Stockholm Palace, a portrayal of Jesus' life in the dome of Adolf Fredrik Church, and a proscenium depicting Eros at the Royal Dramatic Theatre.

He made a final study trip in 1894 to Würzburg, Madrid and Venice, where he focused on Tiepolo's ceiling paintings. The following year, he accepted a professorship at the Royal Academy but, much to the disappointment of his students, resigned in 1898.

In 1885, he had refused to sign a petition criticizing the teaching methods at the Royal Academy and his relationship with the Konstnärsförbundet (Artists' Association) cooled considerably. By 1900, their conflicting views had reached the point where he began to withdraw from public life. He became isolated and his works grew repetitive. Later, he developed an interest in theology. During his final years, he suffered from cancer.

After he died in Stockholm in 1921, his studio was bequeathed to the Nordic Museum and, at the expense of Wilhelmina von Hallwyl, was moved and reassembled at Skansen, an open-air museum and zoo. It served as the setting for the cover photograph of the pop group ABBA's 1981 album, The Visitors.

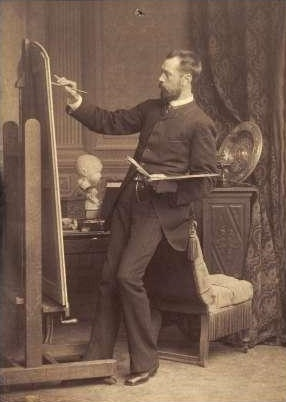
Photo of the artist in 1890

His works may be seen at the Gothenburg Museum of Art, Skansen and the Hallwyl Museum.

== Selected works ==
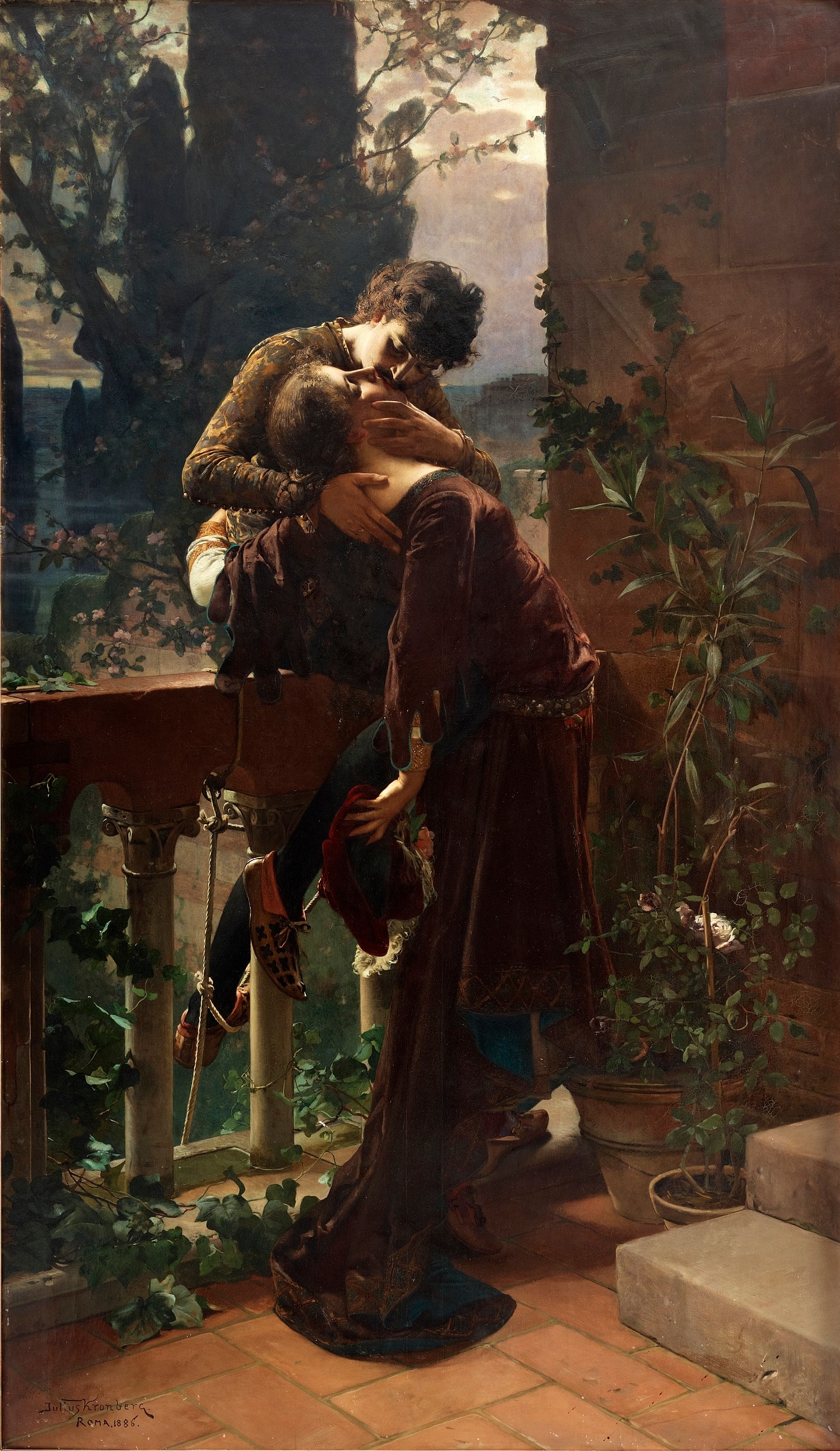
Romeo and Juliet on the Balcony (1886)

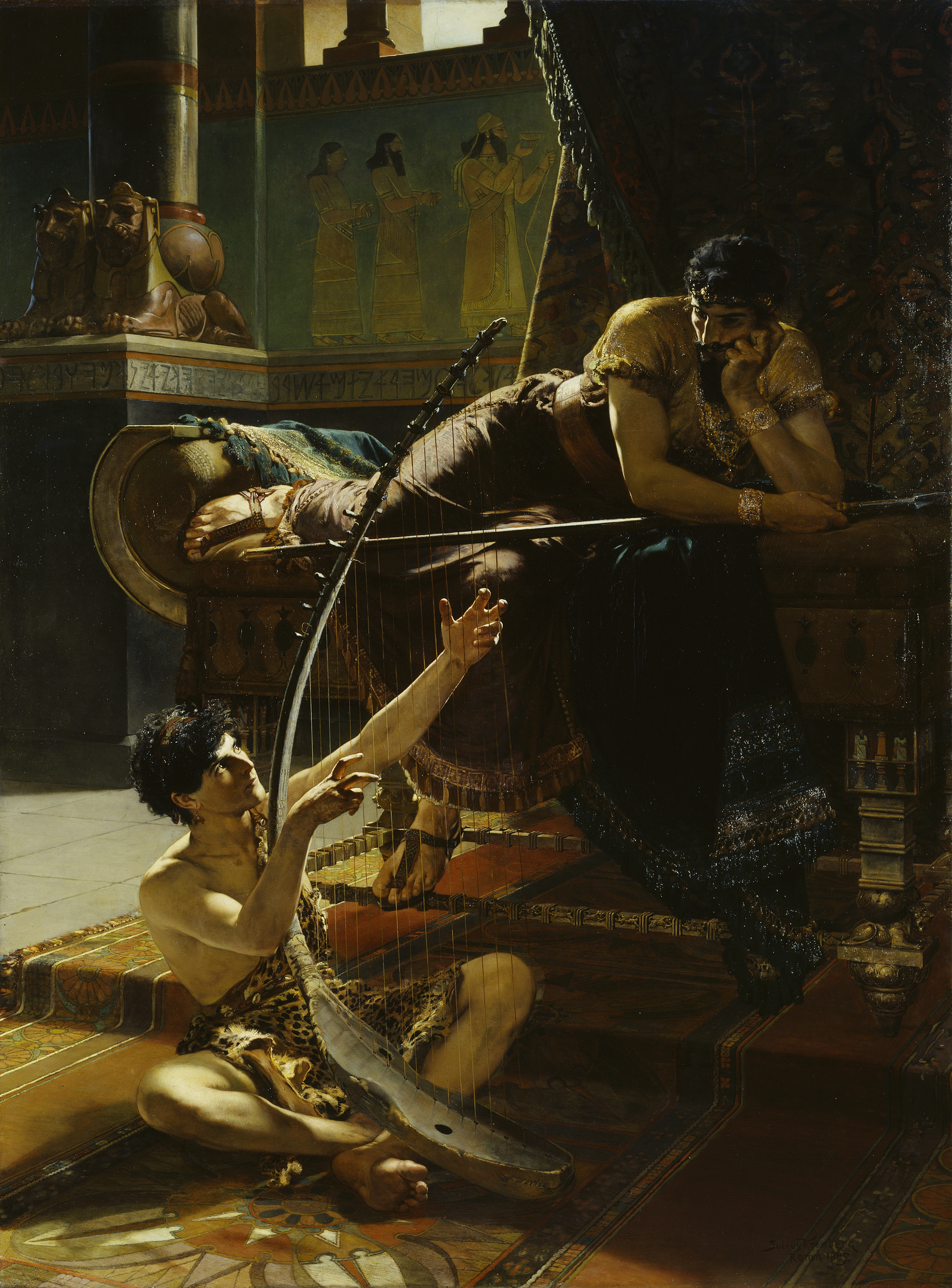
David and Saul (1885)

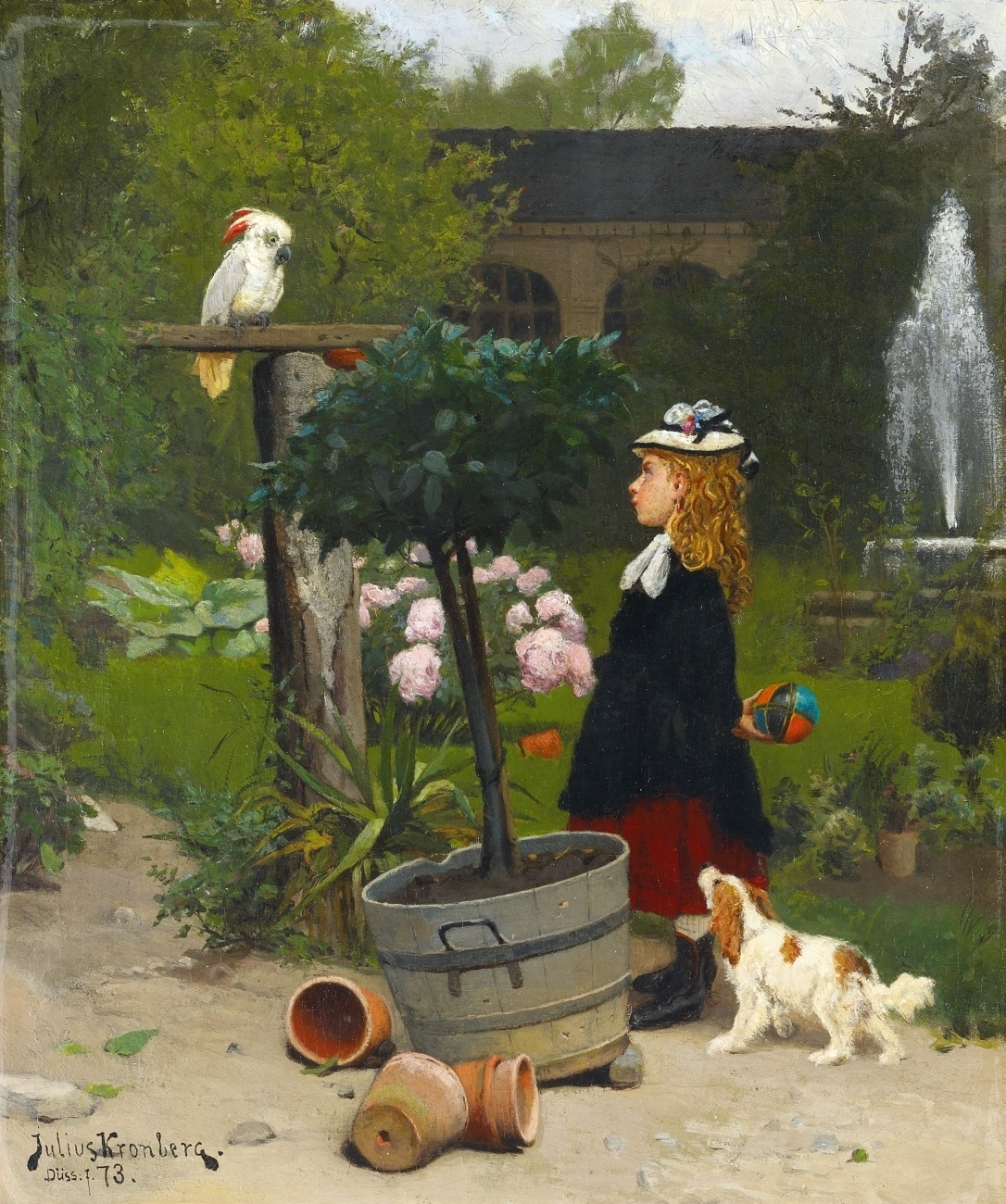
The New Playmate (1873)

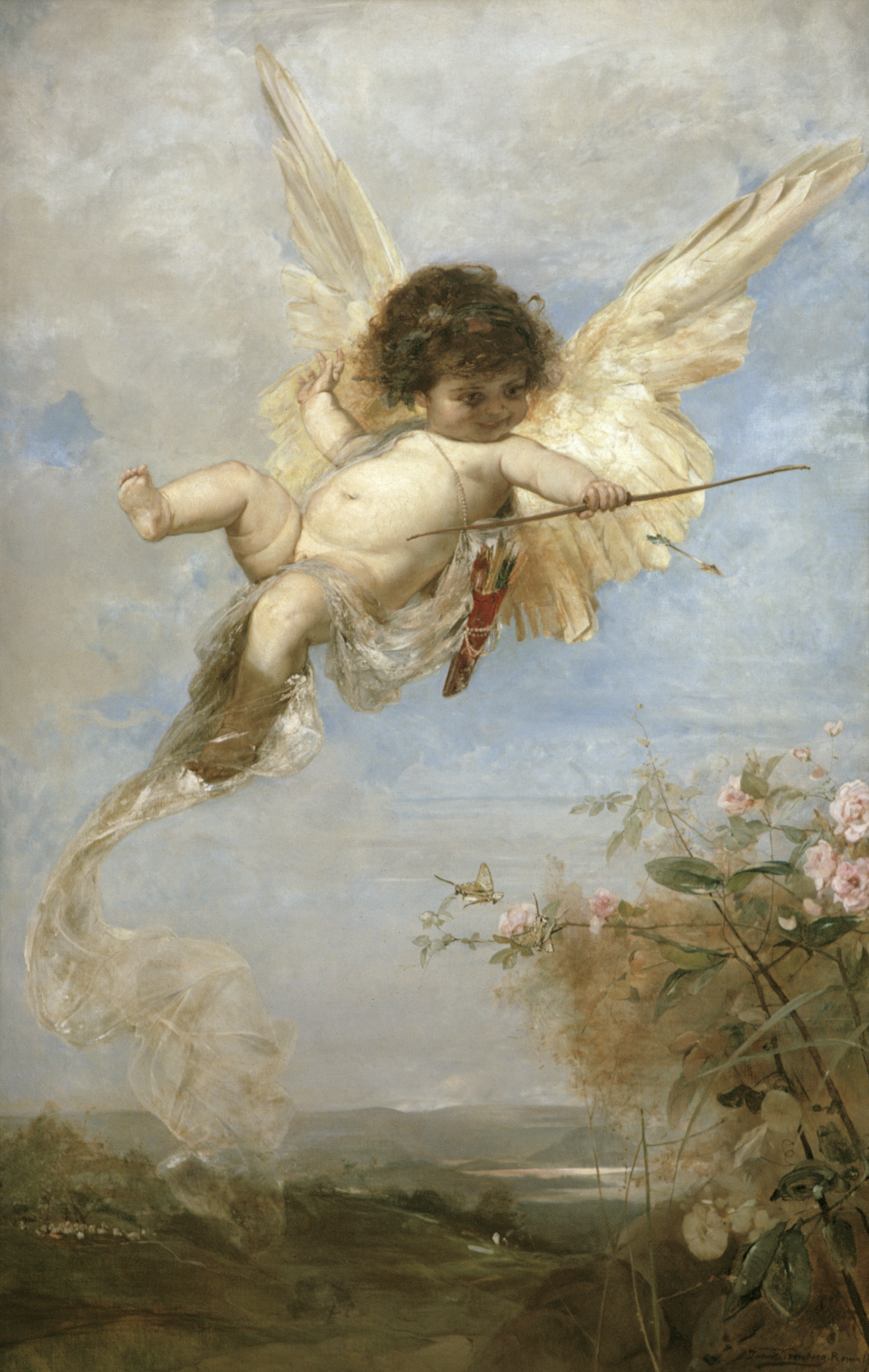
Cupid with a Bow (1878)

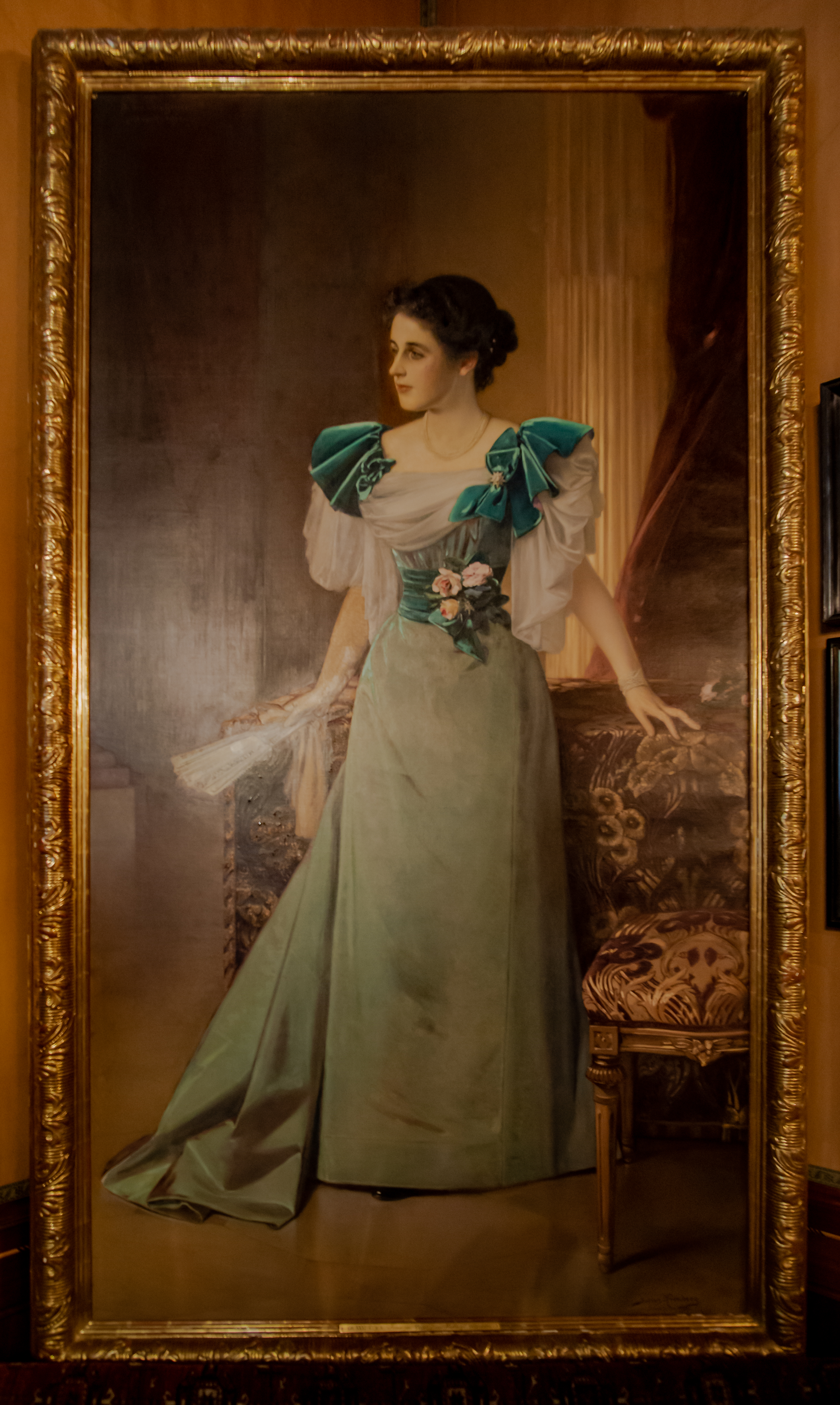
Irma von Geijer, born of Hallwyl (1895)

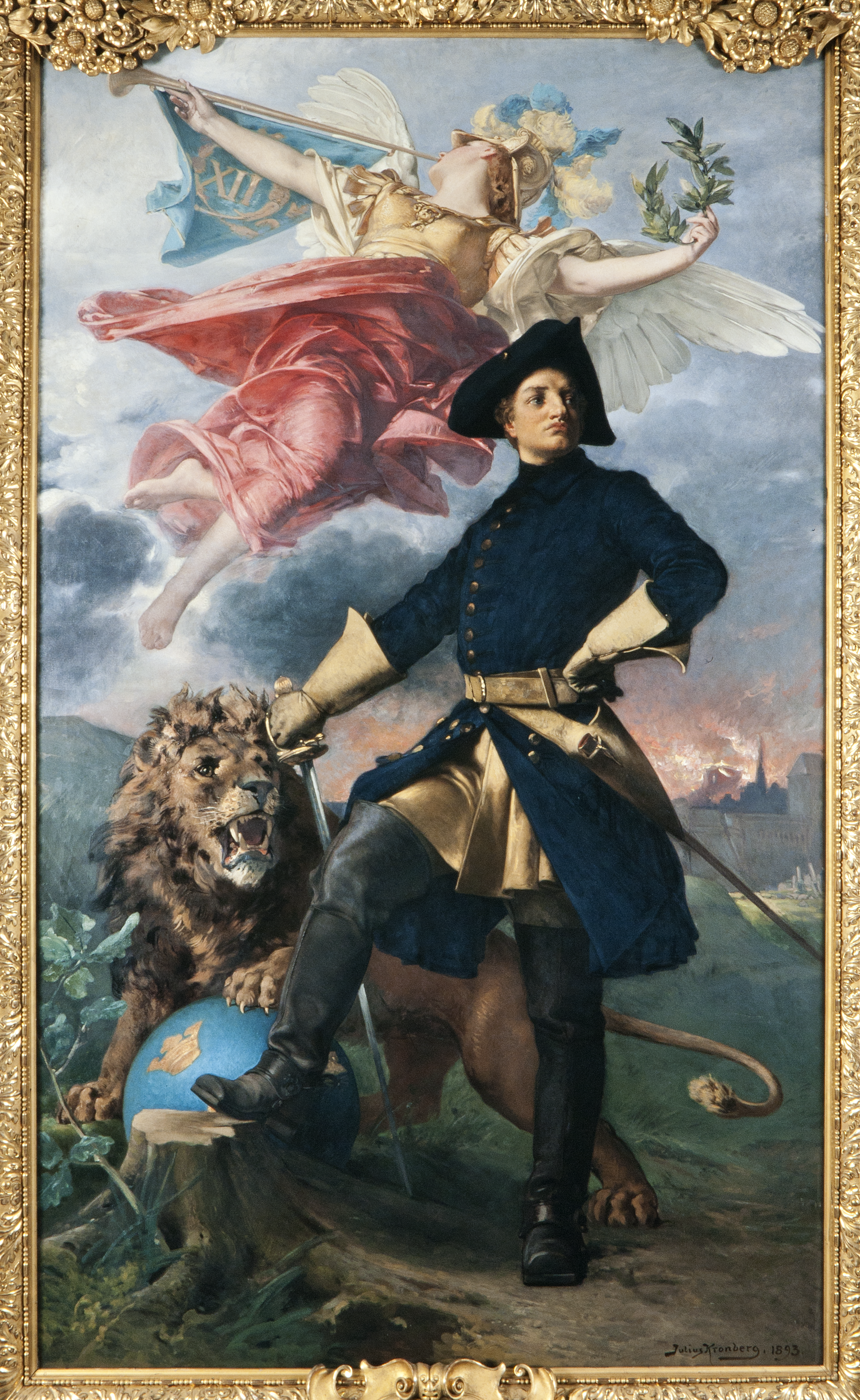
Karl XII (1893)

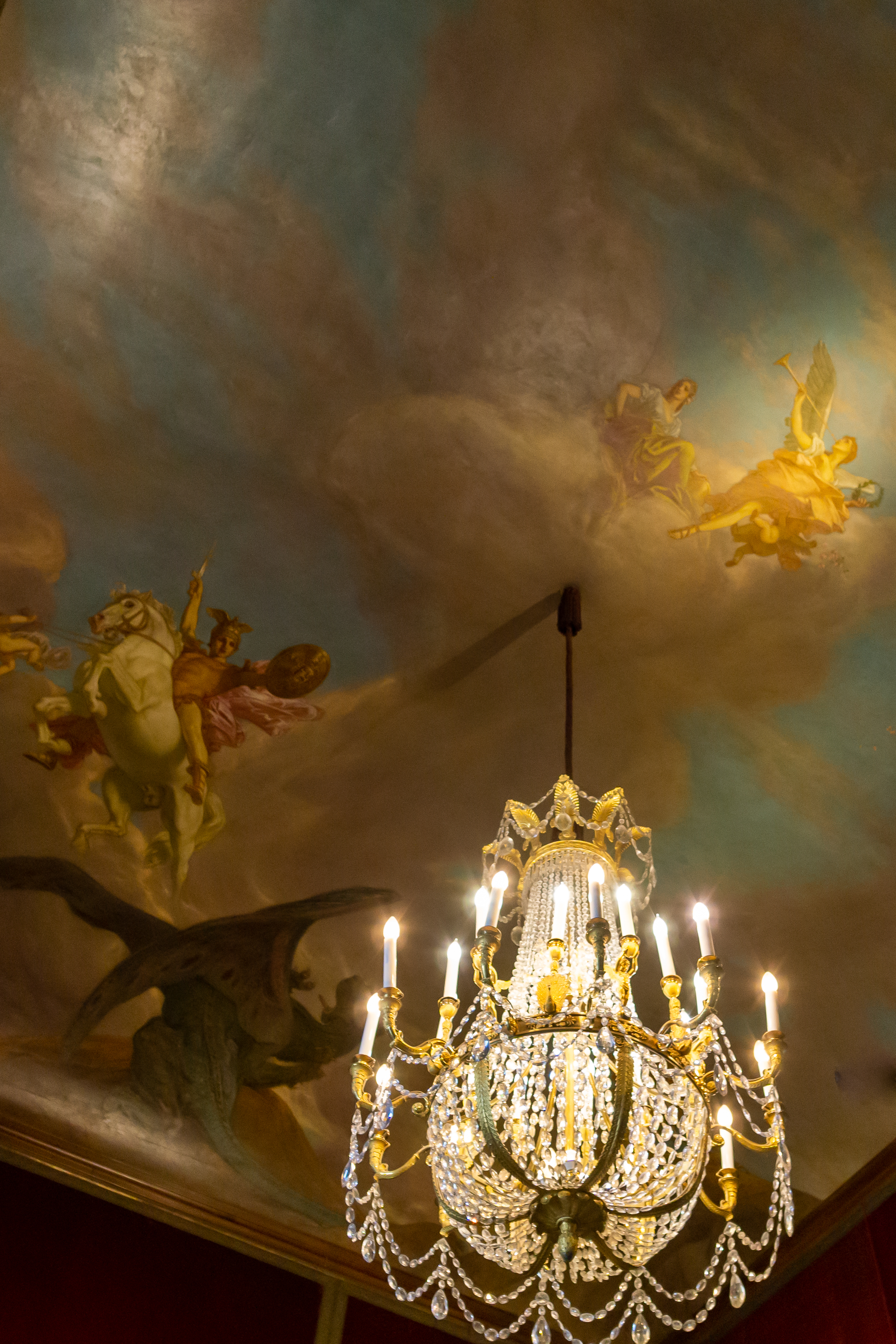
Perseus liberating Andromeda

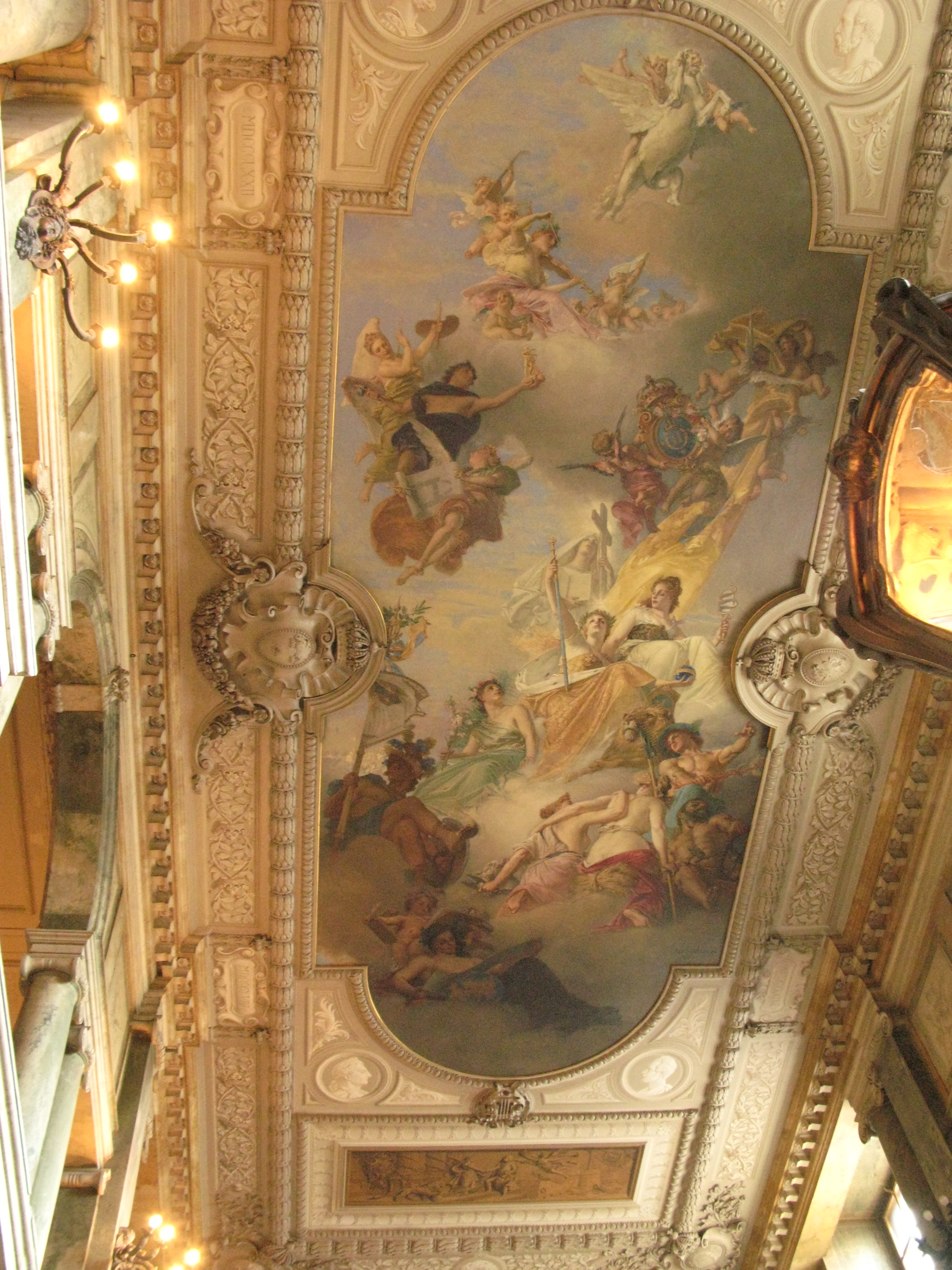
Stockholm Palace ceiling with symbolic figures: Religion, Peace, Science, Industry, and more.

Perseus Releases Andromeda (1918)

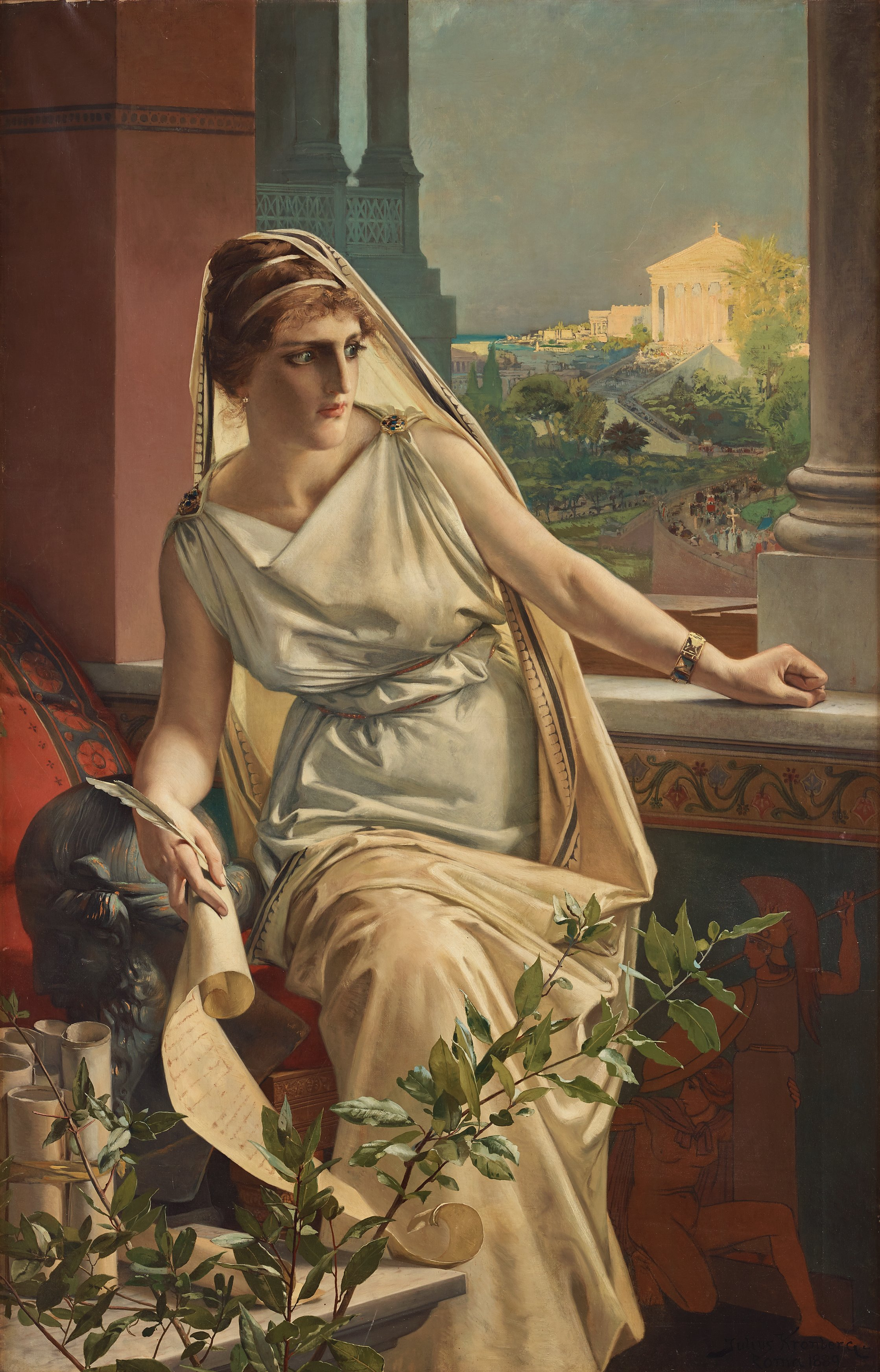
Hypatia (1889)

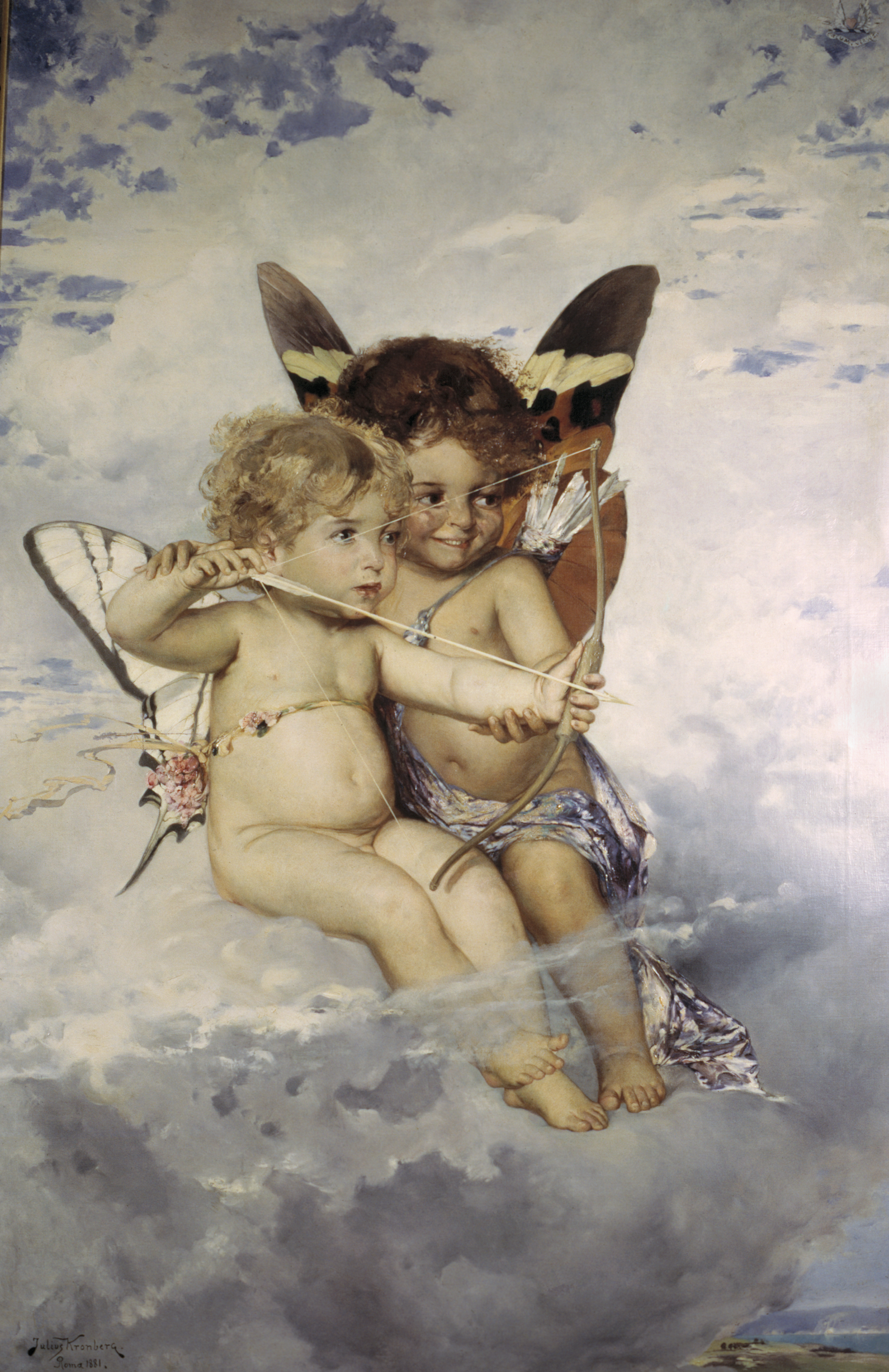
Cupids (1881)

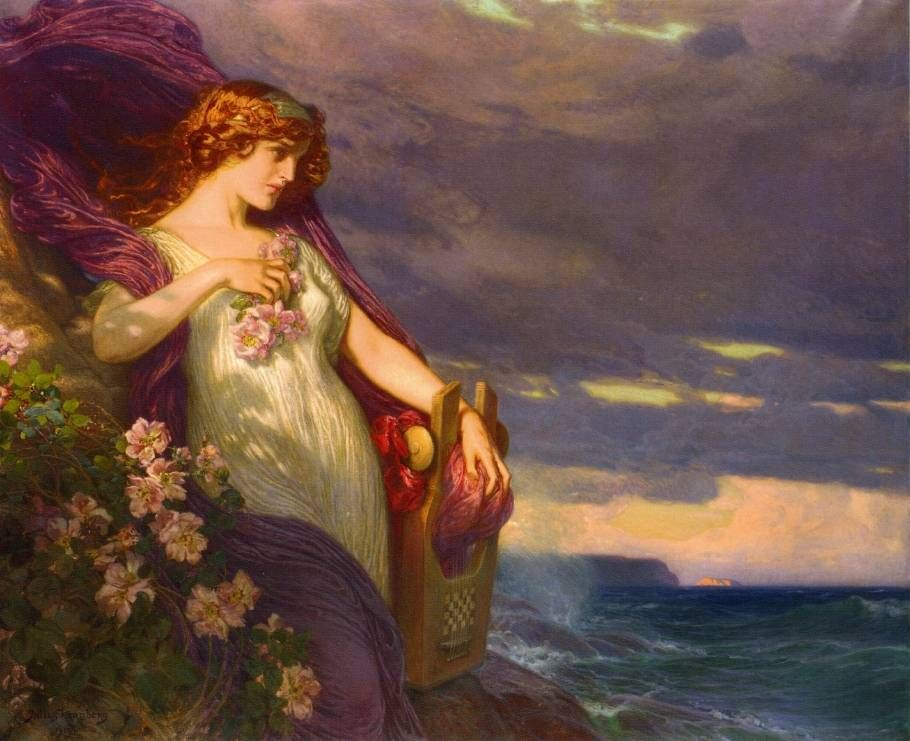
Sappho (1913)

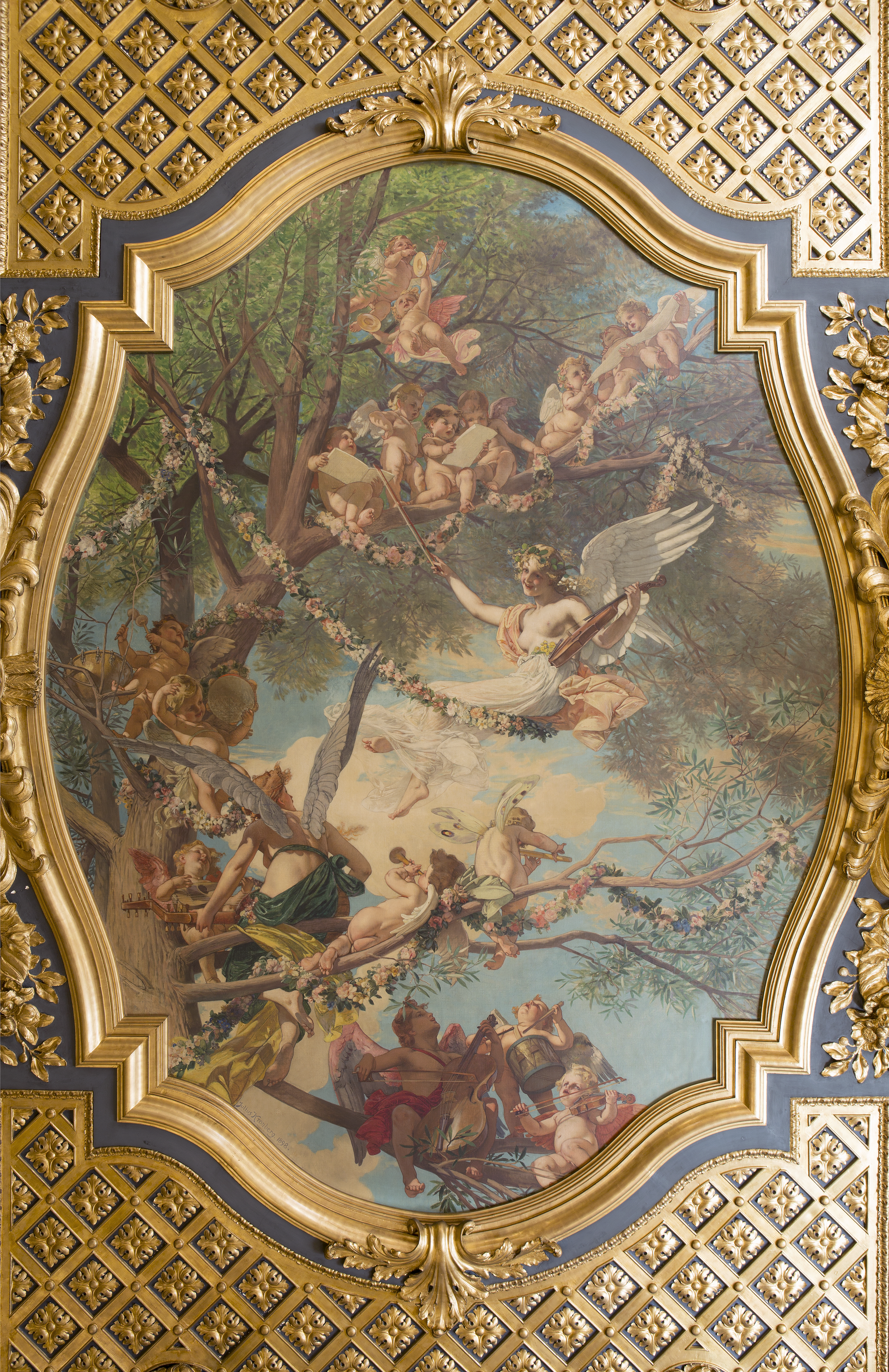
Open Air Concert (1898)
