= Slipping Through My Fingers =

Promotional single by ABBA

from the album The Visitors
- Released: June 1981
- Studio: Polar Music
- Genre: Pop
- Length: 3:51
- Label: Discomate (Japan); RCA (South America)
- Songwriters: Benny Andersson; Björn Ulvaeus
- Producers: Benny Andersson; Björn Ulvaeus

Audio video
- "Slipping Through My Fingers" on YouTube

Alternative cover
- Se Me Está Escapando, Argentina

"Slipping Through My Fingers" is a song written by Björn Ulvaeus and Benny Andersson and recorded by Swedish pop group ABBA, with lead vocals by Agnetha Fältskog. It was released on their November 1981 album The Visitors. The song is about a mother's regret at how quickly her daughter is growing up, and the lack of time they have spent together, as the girl goes to school. The inspiration for the song was Ulvaeus' and Fältskog's daughter, Linda Ulvaeus, who was seven at the time the song was written.

The song was first released in Japan, where it appeared on promotional records by The Coca-Cola Company. The 7" vinyl, released in June 1981, was a single-sided picture disc. The sleeve features a drawing of the group. There was also a picture disc ABBA compilation LP, also titled "Slipping Through My Fingers" and using the same cover art.

== Certifications ==
Region	Certification	Certified units/sales
New Zealand (RMNZ)	Gold	15,000^{‡}
United Kingdom (BPI)	Silver	200,000^{‡}
^{‡} Sales+streaming figures based on certification alone.

== Spanish version ==
"Se Me Está Escapando" is the Spanish Language version of "Slipping Through My Fingers", with lyrics by Buddy and Mary McCluskey. The song was released as a single in Spanish-speaking countries in 1982 and also included on the South American versions of the album The Visitors. The track was first released on CD in 1994 as part of the Polydor US compilation Más ABBA Oro, and in 1999 included on the expanded re-release of ABBA Oro: Grandes Éxitos.
