= Blancmange discography =

- Studio albums: 16
- EPs: 6
- Compilation albums: 7
- Singles: 24
- Video albums: 3
- Box sets: 1
- Remix albums: 1

This is the discography of British new wave/synth-pop band Blancmange.

== Albums ==
=== Studio albums ===
Title	Album details	Peak chart positions							Certifications
Title	Album details	UK	UK Indie	AUS	CAN	GER	NED	NZ	Certifications
Happy Families	Released: 24 September 1982; Label: London; Formats: LP, MC	30	—	17	98	—	—	13	UK: Gold
Mange Tout	Released: 18 May 1984; Label: London; Formats: CD, LP, MC	8	—	—	41	28	16	46	UK: Gold
Believe You Me	Released: 14 October 1985; Label: London; Formats: CD, LP, MC	54	—	—	73	—	—	—	
Blanc Burn	Released: 7 March 2011; Label: Proper; Formats: CD	163	15	—	—	—	—	—	
Happy Families Too...	Released: 3 November 2013; Label: Blanc Check; Formats: CD	—	—	—	—	—	—	—	
Semi Detached	Released: 23 March 2015; Label: Cherry Red; Formats: CD, 2xCD, LP, digital download	131	22	—	—	—	—	—	
Nil by Mouth	Released: 25 September 2015; Label: Blanc Check; Formats: CD, digital download	—	—	—	—	—	—	—	
Commuter 23	Released: 11 March 2016; Label: Blanc Check; Formats: CD, digital download	—	38	—	—	—	—	—	
Unfurnished Rooms	Release date: 29 September 2017; Label: Blanc Check; Formats: CD, LP, digital download	—	40	—	—	—	—	—	
Wanderlust	Release date: 19 October 2018; Label: Blanc Check; Formats: CD, LP, digital download	—	22	—	—	—	—	—	
Nil by Mouth II	Release date: 22 November 2019; Label: Blanc Check; Formats: CD, digital download	—	—	—	—	—	—	—	
Mindset	Release date: 5 June 2020; Label: Blanc Check; Formats: CD, LP, digital download	—	8	—	—	—	—	—	
Nil by Mouth III	Release date: 19 March 2021; Label: Blanc Check; Formats: CD, digital download	—	17	—	—	—	—	—	
Commercial Break	Release date: 24 September 2021; Label: Blanc Check; Formats: CD, digital download	—	14	—	—	—	—	—	
Nil by Mouth IV/V	Release date: 28 January 2022; Label: Blanc Check; Formats: 2xCD, digital download	—	38	—	—	—	—	—	
Private View	Release date: 30 September 2022; Label: London; Formats: CD, LP, digital download	—	8	—	—	—	—	—	
"—" denotes releases that did not chart or were not released in that territory.

=== Remix albums ===
Title	Album details
Expanded Mindset	Released: 11 December 2020; Label: Blanc Check; Formats: CD, digital download

=== Compilation albums ===
Title	Album details
Second Helpings – The Best of Blancmange	Released: 19 November 1990; Label: London; Formats: CD, LP, MC
Blancmange Collection – Heaven Knows	Released: 5 October 1992; Label: Elite; Formats: CD, MC
The Third Course	Released: 14 March 1994; Label: Spectrum Music; Formats: CD, MC
Best of Blancmange	Released: 17 June 1996; Label: Connoisseur Collection; Formats: CD
The Platinum Collection	Released: 2 October 2006; Label: Warner Platinum; Formats: CD
The Very Best of Blancmange	Released: 16 July 2012; Label: Music Club Deluxe/Rhino; Formats: 2xCD
Waiting Room (Volume 1)	Released: 20 March 2020; Label: Self-release, Blanc Check; Formats: CD, digital download; Collection of previously unreleased tracks

=== Box sets ===
Title	Album details
The Blanc Tapes	Released: 4 August 2017; Label: Edsel; Formats: 9xCD

=== Video albums ===
Title	Album details
The Videosingles	Released: August 1983; Label: Spectrum, Sony, PolyGram Music Video; Formats: VHS, Betamax, LaserDisc
Hello Good Evening	Released: November 1984; Label: PolyGram Music Video; Formats: VHS
Live at the Hacienda	Released: 10 October 1994; Label: PolyGram Music Video; Formats: VHS; Limited US-only release

== EPs ==
Title	Album details
Irene & Mavis	Released: April 1980; Label: Blaah Music; Formats: 7"; Limited release
Blancmange	Released: 1983; Label: London; Formats: 12"; Japan-only release
21st Century Blanc Remixes Part 1	Released: 16 April 2011; Label: Proper; Formats: 12"; Limited Record Store Day release
Red Shift	Released: 7 October 2016; Label: Blanc Check; Formats: CD, digital download
Late for Sum	Released: 11 October 2019; Label: Blanc Check; Formats: CD, LP, digital download; Mini-album; Credited as Kincaid featuring Blancmange
Clean Your House	Released: 1 May 2020; Label: Blanc Check; Formats: digital download

== Singles ==
Title	Year	Peak chart positions										Certifications	Album
Title	Year	UK	AUS	BEL	CAN	GER	IRE	NED	NZ	SWI	US Dance	Certifications	Album
"God's Kitchen"/"I've Seen the Word"	1982	65	—	—	—	—	—	—	—	—	—		Happy Families
"Feel Me"	1982	46	—	—	—	—	—	—	—	—	52 (Note: "Living in the Ceiling" and "Feel Me" were released as a double A-sided single in the US and Canada.)		Happy Families
"Living on the Ceiling"	1982	7	5	—	—	—	8	—	41	—	52	UK: Silver	Happy Families
"Waves"	1983	19	99	—	—	29	24	50	33	—	—		Happy Families
"Blind Vision"	1983	10	—	—	—	44	11	—	—	—	3		Mange Tout
"That's Love, That It Is"	1983	33	—	—	—	—	—	—	—	—	16 (Note: In the US, "That's Love, That It Is" charted with its 12" B-side "Game Above My Head".)		Mange Tout
"Don't Tell Me"	1984	8	—	35	48	34	10	26	—	27	44		Mange Tout
"The Day Before You Came"	1984	22	—	39	—	52	25	—	—	—	—		Mange Tout
"What's Your Problem"	1985	40	—	—	—	—	30	—	—	—	—		Believe You Me
"Lose Your Love"	1985	77	—	—	—	—	—	—	—	—	2 (Note: In the US, "Lose Your Love" charted with its 12" B-side "Ave Maria" by West India Company.)		Believe You Me
"I Can See It"	1986	71	—	—	—	—	—	—	—	—	—		Non-album single
"Drive Me"	2011	—	—	—	—	—	—	—	—	—	—		Blanc Burn
"Paddington"	2015	—	—	—	—	—	—	—	—	—	—		Semi Detached
"I Want More"	2015	—	—	—	—	—	—	—	—	—	—		Semi Detached
"Useless"	2015	—	—	—	—	—	—	—	—	—	—		Semi Detached
"Last Night (I Dreamt I Had a Job)"	2016	—	—	—	—	—	—	—	—	—	—		Commuter 23
"Distant Storm"	2018	—	—	—	—	—	—	—	—	—	—		Wanderlust
"Not a Priority"	2018	—	—	—	—	—	—	—	—	—	—		Wanderlust
"Big Fat Head" (Kincaid featuring Blancmange)	2019	—	—	—	—	—	—	—	—	—	—		Late for Sum
"I Smashed Your Phone"	2019	—	—	—	—	—	—	—	—	—	—		Wanderlust
"Living on the Ceiling" (Roman Flügel remix)	2020	—	—	—	—	—	—	—	—	—	—		Non-album singles
"Blind Vision" (Honey Dijon remix)	2020	—	—	—	—	—	—	—	—	—	—		Non-album singles
"Mindset"	2020	—	—	—	—	—	—	—	—	—	—		Mindset
"Reduced Voltage"	2022	—	—	—	—	—	—	—	—	—	—		Private View
"—" denotes releases that did not chart or were not released in that territory.

=== Radio session tracks ===
- "I Would" / "Living on the Ceiling" / "Waves" / "Running Thin" (Recorded for a February 1982 Peel Session show.)
