= Second Helpings =

Compilation album by Blancmange
- Released: 19 November 1990
- Genre: Synthpop, new wave
- Length: 49:27
- Label: London Records

Blancmange chronology
Believe You Me (1985)	Second Helpings (1990)	Heaven Knows (1992)

Professional ratings
Review scores
Source	Rating
AllMusic	4.5/5 stars
New Musical Express	6/10

Second Helpings is a compilation album by the British synthpop band Blancmange. It contains most of the band's singles from the period 1982-85, as well as a previously unreleased track.

== Track listing ==
=== CD: 828 043-2 ===
Track
No.	Title	Album	Length
1.	"God's Kitchen"	Happy Families	2:55
2.	"I've Seen the Word"	Happy Families	3:05
3.	"Feel Me"	Happy Families	5:06
4.	"Living on the Ceiling"	Happy Families	4:01
5.	"Waves"	Happy Families	4:07
6.	"Game Above My Head"	Mange Tout	3:59
7.	"Blind Vision"	Mange Tout	3:58
8.	"That's Love, That It Is"	Mange Tout	4:20
9.	"Don't Tell Me"	Mange Tout	3:31
10.	"The Day Before You Came*"	Mange Tout	4:25
11.	"What's Your Problem"	Believe You Me	4:11
12.	"Your Time Is Over"	First appearance	5:49

=== CD: 828 218-2 ===
The Canadian release added three remixes to the CD, and substituted a different version of "Game Above My Head," for a total length of 76:22.

Track
No.	Title	Album	Length
1.	"God's Kitchen"	Happy Families	2:55
2.	"I've Seen the Word"	Happy Families	3:05
3.	"Feel Me"	Happy Families	5:06
4.	"Living on the Ceiling"	Happy Families	4:01
5.	"Waves"	Happy Families	4:07
6.	"Game Above My Head (Extended Version)"	Waves 12" B-side	7:14
7.	"Blind Vision"	Mange Tout	3:58
8.	"That's Love, That It Is"	Mange Tout	4:20
9.	"Don't Tell Me"	Mange Tout	3:31
10.	"The Day Before You Came"	Mange Tout	4:25
11.	"What's Your Problem"	Believe You Me	4:11
12.	"Your Time Is Over"	First appearance	5:49
13.	"That's Love, That It Is (Extended Version)"	That's Love, That It Is (New Dance Mix Version) 12"	6:56
14.	"Blind Vision (Extended Version)"	Blind Vision 12"	9:39
15.	"Feel Me (Extended Version)"	Blancmange EP (Japan exclusive)	6:57

- All songs written by Neil Arthur & Stephen Luscombe, except for "The Day Before You Came", written by Benny Andersson & Björn Ulvaeus.
