= Heaven Knows (Blancmange album) =

Compilation album by Blancmange
- Released: 5 October 1992
- Genre: New wave
- Length: 62:02
- Label: Elite

Blancmange chronology
Second Helpings (1990)	Heaven Knows (1992)	The Third Course (1994)

Heaven Knows (1992) is a compilation of Blancmange singles, album and non-album tracks.

This compilation marks the first appearance of tracks 2, 3, 7, 11 and 15 on compact disc.

== Track listing ==
=== CD: ELITE024 CDP ===
Track
No.	Title	Album	Length
1.	"Blind Vision"	Mange Tout	4:00
2.	"Heaven Knows Where Heaven Is"	Blind Vision 7" B-side	3:27
3.	"I Can See It"	I Can See It 7"	4:09
4.	"God's Kitchen"	Happy Families	2:56
5.	"What's Your Problem"	Believe You Me	4:13
6.	"Feel Me"	Happy Families	5:08
7.	"Sad Day"	Original version; first appearance	3:11
8.	"Living on the Ceiling"	Happy Families	4:02
9.	"Don't Tell Me"	Mange Tout	3:32
10.	"I've Seen The Word"	Happy Families	3:07
11.	"Running Thin"	Living on the Ceiling 7" B-side	2:21
12.	"Waves"	Waves 7"	4:11
13.	"That's Love, That It Is"	Mange Tout	4:22
14.	"Don't You Love It All"	Believe You Me	4:27
15.	"Why Can't They Leave Things Alone"	Believe You Me	4:32
16.	"The Day Before You Came"	The Day Before You Came 7"	4:24

- All songs written by Neil Arthur & Stephen Luscombe, except for "The Day Before You Came", written by Benny Andersson & Björn Ulvaeus.
