= The Platinum Collection (Blancmange album) =

Compilation album by Blancmange
- Released: 2 October 2006
- Genre: New wave
- Length: 75:11
- Label: Rhino

Blancmange chronology
Best of Blancmange (1996)	The Platinum Collection (2006)	Blanc Burn (2011)

The Platinum Collection is a compilation of Blancmange singles, album and non-album tracks released on 2 October 2006 on the Rhino label as part of the Warner Platinum series.

== Track listing ==
All songs are written by Neil Arthur & Stephen Luscombe, except where noted.

=== CD: 5101-16979-2 ===
1. "God's Kitchen" – 2:54
2. "I've Seen the Word" – 3:04
3. "Feel Me" – 5:04
4. "Living on the Ceiling" – 3:59
5. "Waves" – 4:07
6. "Blind Vision" – 4:01
7. "That's Love, That It Is" – 4:23
8. "The Day Before You Came" (Andersson/Ulvaeus) – 5:50
9. "What's Your Problem" – 4:10
10. "Running Thin" – 2:16
11. "I Can't Explain" – 3:59
12. "Vishnu" – 4:45
13. "Get Out of That" – 4:25
14. "All Things Are Nice" – 4:58
15. "Lose Your Love" – 4:04
16. "Game Above My Head" – 3:57
17. "Your Time Is Over" – 5:44
18. "Don't Tell Me" – 3:31
