= Best of Blancmange =

The Best of Blancmange

Compilation album by Blancmange
- Released: 17 June 1996
- Genre: New wave
- Length: 68:14
- Label: Connoisseur Collection

Blancmange chronology
| The Third Course (1994) | The Best of Blancmange (1996) | The Platinum Collection (2006) |

Professional ratings
Review scores
| Source | Rating |
|---|---|
| Allmusic | 4/5 stars |

The Best of Blancmange (1996) is a compilation of singles, album and non album tracks from the English musical group Blancmange

== Track listing ==
All songs written by Neil Arthur & Stephen Luscombe, except where noted.

=== CD: VSOP CD226 ===
1. "God's Kitchen" – 2:55
2. "I've Seen the Word" – 3:05
3. "Feel Me" – 5:04
4. "Living on the Ceiling" – 4:00
5. "Running Thin" – 2:21
6. "I Can't Explain" – 4:02
7. "Waves" – 4:10
8. "Blind Vision" – 4:00
9. "That's Love, That It Is" – 4:19
10. "Vishnu" – 5:17
11. "Don't Tell Me" – 3:32
12. "Get Out of That" – 4:24
13. "The Day Before You Came" (Andersson/Ulvaeus) – 4:27
14. "All Things Are Nice (Version)" – 4:13
15. "What's Your Problem" – 4:10
16. "Lose Your Love" – 4:07
17. "I Can See It" – 4:08
