= The Very Best of Blancmange =

Compilation album by Blancmange
- Released: 16 July 2012
- Recorded: 1981–2012
- Genre: New wave; synth-pop; alternative dance
- Length: CD1: 78:54 CD2: 79:47
- Label: Rhino

Blancmange chronology
Blanc Burn (2011)	The Very Best of Blancmange (2012)	Happy Families Too... (2013)

The Very Best of Blancmange is a double CD compilation album by the English synth-pop band Blancmange, released on 16 July 2012 by Rhino Records. It is composed of singles, album and non-album tracks, and remixes from their first three studio albums. It contains one new track, "Making Aeroplanes (Without Victoria)".

== Track listing ==
All songs are written by Neil Arthur & Stephen Luscombe, except where noted.

=== CD 1 ===
1. "Living on the Ceiling" (7" Mix) – 4:03
2. "Don't Tell Me" (7" Mix) – 3:32
3. "I Can't Explain" – 4:02
4. "Feel Me" (7" Mix) – 5:06
5. "Blind Vision" – 3:59
6. "Waves" (7" Mix) – 4:09
7. "The Day Before You Came" (7" Remix) – 5:51 (Andersson/Ulvaeus)
8. "I've Seen the Word" (7" Mix) – 3:06
9. "God's Kitchen" (7" Mix) – 2:55
10. "That's Love, That It Is" (7" Mix) – 4:25
11. "Wasted" (Extended Version) – 4:19
12. "Lose Your Love" (Album Version) – 4:04
13. "What's Your Problem" (7" Mix) – 4:12
14. "Kind" – 3:58
15. "All Things Are Nice" – 4:59
16. "Murder" – 5:58
17. "Running Thin" (Peel Session) – 2:20
18. "I Would" (Peel Session) – 4:06
19. "Making Aeroplanes (Without Victoria)" – 3:57 [New Track 2012]

=== CD 2 ===
1. "Blind Vision" (12" Mix) – 9:39
2. "Don't Tell Me" (12" Mix) – 6:24
3. "Feel Me" (12" John Luongo Mix) – 7:03
4. "Game Above My Head" (Long Version) – 7:10
5. "That's Love, That It Is" (Remix Extended Version) – 7:34
6. "Vishnu" (Short Version) – 4:44
7. "God's Kitchen" (12" Mix) – 4:28
8. "Sad Day" (Original Version) – 3:10
9. "Waves" (Original Version) – 4:23
10. "Why Don't They Leave Things Alone?" – 4:36
11. "Lorraine's My Nurse" – 2:32
12. "See the Train" – 2:05
13. "Don't You Love It All" – 4:33
14. "Living on the Ceiling" (Long Version) – 5:38
15. "Hello Darling" (Blue World) – 5:58 (Stephen Luscombe)
