= The Third Course =

Compilation album by Blancmange
- Released: 14 March 1994
- Genre: New wave
- Length: 53:13
- Label: Spectrum Music

Blancmange chronology
Heaven Knows (1992)	The Third Course (1994)	Best of Blancmange (1996)

The Third Course (1994) is a compilation of Blancmange singles, album and non album tracks.

== Track listing ==
All songs written by Neil Arthur & Stephen Luscombe, except where noted.

=== CD: 550 194-2 ===
1. "Feel Me" – 5:07
2. "I've Seen the Word" – 3:07
3. "God's Kitchen" – 2:56
4. "I Can't Explain" – 4:03
5. "Waves" – 4:09
6. "Lose Your Love" – 4:06
7. "No Wonder They Never Made it Back" – 3:29
8. "The Day Before You Came" (Andersson/Ulvaeus) – 4:27
9. "All Things Are Nice (Version)" – 4:14
10. "Running Thin" – 2:20
11. "Game Above My Head" – 3:59
12. "Wasted" – 4:20
13. "Get Out of That" – 4:26
14. "Lorraine's My Nurse" – 2:30
