= Happy Families Too... =

Studio album by Blancmange
- Released: 3 November 2013; 7 April 2014 (Cherry Red release)
- Length: 41:58 (2013) / 72:31 (2014)
- Label: Blanc Check Records (2013); Cherry Red (2014)

Blancmange chronology
The Very Best of Blancmange (2012)	Happy Families Too... (2013)	Semi Detached (2015)

Happy Families Too... is the fifth studio album by the English band Blancmange. A re-recording of the band's 1982 debut album Happy Families, the album was originally made available at Blancmange concerts in November 2013, before receiving a wider release via Cherry Red in April 2014.

== Background ==
In November 2013, Blancmange embarked on a UK tour to perform the Happy Families album in its entirety for the first time live. To coincide with the tour, the band re-recorded the album and made it available to purchase at venues during the tour. While the album involved original band member Stephen Luscombe, he did not join the band on tour for health reasons. The album's wider release in 2014 featured an additional five tracks, including four remixes and a re-recording of the 1982 B-side "Running Thin".

In 2013, Arthur said in a press release for the album: "I wanted to approach the songs using today's technology. Rather than just dust off the old songs, I wanted to bring something fresh to the project and make it a contemporary reworking rather than an exact imitation."

== Critical reception ==
Professional ratings
Review scores
Source	Rating
AllMusic	3.5/5 stars
Louder Than War	8.5/10
Q	3/5 stars
Record Collector	3/5 stars
The Yorkshire Times	favourable

Upon release, David Jeffries of AllMusic considered the album to be "delivered with a modern boom for the bass along with some other minor touches that hardcore fans will enjoy". He concluded: "Happy Families Too is unnecessary, admirable, or awesome depending on your viewpoint, but that third classification is certain for anyone who adored the original." Paul Scott-Bates of Louder Than War wrote: "Happy Families was the sort of album that had timeless tracks that maybe needed a bit of a dusting down, and with Happy Families Too the boys have succeeded admirably." In Q John Aizlewood said that although the duo had been overlooked in favour of the Pet Shop Boys and Soft Cell, their reputation had improved over time, and "their quiet insistence on boundary pushing leaves them more untouched by time than their peers". Mark Elliott of Record Collector commented: "Purists will enjoy a new take on tracks that nudge them in a fresh direction, while simultaneously exorcising the memory of the sometimes tinny original production."

== Track listing ==
All tracks are written by Neil Arthur and Stephen Luscombe.

No.	Title	Length
1.	"I Can't Explain"	4:23
2.	"Feel Me"	5:34
3.	"I've Seen the Word"	3:03
4.	"Wasted"	4:57
5.	"Living on the Ceiling"	3:38
6.	"Waves"	4:21
7.	"Kind"	4:04
8.	"Sad Day"	4:26
9.	"Cruel"	4:32
10.	"God's Kitchen"	3:00

2014 edition additional tracks
No.	Title	Length
11.	"Running Thin"	2:42
12.	"Feel Me" (Greg Wilson & Derek Kaye Remix)	8:22
13.	"Living on the Ceiling" (Vince Clarke Remix)	6:13
14.	"Cruel" (Komputer Remix)	7:38
15.	"God's Kitchen" (Komputer Remix)	5:37

== Personnel ==
Blancmange

- Neil Arthur - lead vocals, keyboards
- Stephen Luscombe - keyboards

Additional musicians

- David Rhodes - guitar
- Pandit Dinesh - percussion (track 5)
- Eleanor Arthur - backing vocals (tracks 1–2)

Production

- Adam Fuest - mixing
- Tim Debney - mastering
- Gary Barnshaw - executive producer

Other

- Michael Brownlow - artwork
- Adam Yeldham, Dan Tyler - design
