= Heaven Knows =

Heaven Knows may refer to:

== Albums ==
- Heaven Knows (Jaki Graham album), 1985
- Heaven Knows (Blancmange album), 1992
- Heaven Knows (Rick Price album), 1992
- Heaven Knows (PinkPantheress album), 2023

== Songs ==
- "Heaven Knows" (Donna Summer song), 1978
- "Heaven Knows" (Robert Plant song), 1988
- "Heaven Knows" (When in Rome song), 1988
- "Heaven Knows" (Lalah Hathaway song), 1990
- "Heaven Knows" (Rick Price song), 1992
- "Heaven Knows" (Luther Vandross song), 1993
- "Heaven Knows" (Squeeze song), 1995
- "Heaven Knows" (Nana Mizuki song), 2001
- "Heaven Knows" (Taylor Hicks song), 2006
- "Heaven Knows" (The Pretty Reckless song), 2013
- "Heaven Knows", by Boyzone from A Different Beat, 1996
- "Heaven Knows", by The Corrs from Forgiven, Not Forgotten, 1995
- "Heaven Knows", by Five for Fighting from Bookmarks, 2013
- "Heaven Knows", by The Grass Roots from Leaving It All Behind, 1969
- "Heaven Knows", by Mari Hamada from Colors, 1990
- "Heaven Knows", by Rise Against from Revolutions per Minute, 2003

== See also ==
- Heaven Only Knows (disambiguation)
