= Nil by Mouth =

Nil by Mouth may refer to:

- Nothing by mouth or nil by mouth, a medical instruction
- Nil by Mouth (album), a 2015 album by Blancmange
- Nil by Mouth (charity), an anti-sectarian charity in Glasgow, Scotland
- Nil by Mouth (film), a 1997 British film directed by Gary Oldman
- "Nil by Mouth", a 2001 song by Blindspott
- "Nil by Mouth", a 2018 instrumental by Haken from Vector
- "Nil by Mouth", a 2021 song by Dean Blunt from Black Metal 2
