= Blanc Burn =

Studio album by Blancmange
- Released: 7 March 2011
- Genre: New wave; synth-pop
- Length: 46:52
- Label: Proper
- Producer: Blancmange

Blancmange chronology
The Platinum Collection (2006)	Blanc Burn (2011)	The Very Best of Blancmange (2012)

Singles from Blanc Burn
- 1. "Drive Me" Released: 13 February 2011

Professional ratings
Aggregate scores
Source	Rating
Metacritic	74/100
Review scores
Source	Rating
The Guardian	4/5 stars
Mojo	4/5 stars
musicOMH	3/5 stars
Q	3/5 stars
Uncut	2/5 stars

Blanc Burn is the fourth studio album by English synth-pop duo Blancmange, released on 7 March 2011 by Proper Records. It was Blancmange's first album of new material in a quarter of a century, following 1985's Believe You Me.

== Track listing ==
No.	Title	Writer(s)	Length
1.	"By the Bus Stop @ Woolies"	Neil Arthur; Stephen Luscombe	3:39
2.	"Drive Me"	Arthur	4:15
3.	"Ultraviolent"	Arthur	3:37
4.	"The Western"	Arthur; Luscombe	3:40
5.	"Radio Therapy"	Arthur	4:34
6.	"Probably Nothing"	Arthur	5:27
7.	"I'm Having a Coffee"	Arthur; Luscombe	3:55
8.	"Don't Let These Days"	Arthur	4:19
9.	"WDYF"	Arthur; Luscombe	4:33
10.	"Don't Forget Your Teeth"	Arthur; Luscombe	4:11
11.	"Starfucker"	Arthur; Luscombe	4:42

iTunes Store bonus track
No.	Title	Length
12.	"I'm Seeing Stars"	3:43

== Personnel ==
Credits adapted from the liner notes of Blanc Burn.

=== Blancmange ===
- Neil Arthur
- Stephen Luscombe

=== Additional musicians ===
- Pandit Dinesh – featured artist (tracks 2, 4, 8–11)

=== Technical ===
- Blancmange – production
- Mauro Caccialanza – engineering (tracks 1, 2, 4–7, 9–11)
- Adam Fuest – mixing (tracks 3, 8)
- Tim Young – mastering

=== Artwork ===
- Adam Yeldham – sleeve design
- Blancmange – sleeve design
- Joe Arthur – "Ultraviolent" drawing
- Eleanor Arthur – "Don't Let These Days" image
- Helen Kincaid – "WDYF" image ("Hole")
- Neil Arthur – other images

== Charts ==
Chart (2011)	Peak position
UK Albums (OCC)	163
