= Happy Families (album) =

Studio album by Blancmange
- Released: 24 September 1982
- Recorded: February–August 1982
- Studios: CBS (London); Battery (London)
- Genres: Synth-pop; new wave
- Length: 40:29
- Label: London
- Producer: Mike Howlett

Blancmange chronology
Happy Families (1982)	Mange Tout (1984)

Singles from Happy Families
- 1. "I've Seen the Word"/"God's Kitchen" Released: 26 March 1982; 2. "Feel Me" Released: 16 July 1982; 3. "Living on the Ceiling" Released: 15 October 1982; 4. "Waves" Released: 11 February 1983

Happy Families is the debut studio album by the English synth-pop band Blancmange, released by London Records on 24 September 1982. It peaked at No. 30 on the UK Albums Chart, aided by the success of the album's third single, "Living on the Ceiling", released the following month, which became Blancmange's breakthrough hit, reaching No. 7 in the UK Singles Chart. A re-recorded version of the album, titled Happy Families Too..., was released in 2013.

== Composition ==
"Waves" was written by Neil Arthur about his girlfriend. "God's Kitchen" describes the confusion Arthur's mother felt on sending the young Arthur to Sunday school at the same time her father was being killed. In contrast, Arthur told Melody Maker that "Feel Me" and "I've Seen the Word" had no important lyrical meaning – he had started to write "Feel Me" as a typical love song, and then changed it to being about robbing a person, putting your hands in their pockets, and then suddenly realising that you are attracted to them.

== Release ==
Initial pressings of the album in 1982 contained the original version of "Waves" – on later pressings and on the subsequent CD issues this version was replaced by the 7" single version, which had been remixed by Denis Weinrich and the band's manager John Owen Williams, and included re-recorded vocals and a string section arranged by Linton Naiff. The original version remained unavailable on any format until its inclusion on the 2012 compilation album The Very Best of Blancmange. The Canadian release of the album had a slightly rearranged running order and included a special mix of the song "Blind Vision", released as a single in May 1983 and which appeared on the group's second studio album Mange Tout in the UK in 1984.

In 2008 Edsel Records reissued Happy Families as a remastered and expanded version titled Happy Families... Plus. This version of the album added six bonus tracks to the original ten-track album: the extended versions of the singles "God's Kitchen", "Feel Me" and "Living on the Ceiling"; two instrumental mixes of "Feel Me"; and the instrumental track "Business Steps" (originally the B-side of "Waves"). However, Happy Families... Plus featured the 7" single versions of not just "Waves" but also "Living on the Ceiling", rather than the original album versions.

=== Melody Maker flexidisc ===
Excerpts of the songs "Living on the Ceiling" and "Sad Day" featured on one side of a flexi disc given away free with the issue of Melody Maker dated 24 April 1982. The other side of the disc featured the song "Born Every Minute" by the Passage.

== Critical reception ==
Professional ratings
Review scores
Source	Rating
AllMusic	4/5 stars
Smash Hits	7/10
Sounds	5/5 stars

Critical reception for Happy Families was mixed, with some reviewers feeling the album trod a sometimes unsuccessful path between experimental aspirations and commercial sensibilities. Melody Maker stated that "touting the chalk and cheese, odd couple image, [Arthur and Luscombe]'s misfit marriage of experimentalism and unprepossessing pop was always in grave danger of belittling itself into an English Eighties parody of Sparks, parodying Joy Division, aping Depeche Mode... Happy Families, their debut album, is every bit the entertaining disappointment that anyone familiar with Blancmange's nervous live shows had a right to expect... Their brave schizophrenia is invariably self-defeating, their adventurously varied song treatments befuddling where a more open, honest approach could have unearthed brilliance."

NME said that "Happy Families is a calmly assured collection of work: maybe not stamped with greatness, quite, but there's not a number in the whole ten that's without appeal, intelligence and warmth... There's impressive, though never overstated, drama in their delivery and winning ingenuity in their arrangements: a nicely controlled excitement... the flaws are minor and the merits are major." Smash Hits felt that the album "occupies a curious no-man's land between near criminal stylistic nicking from a cast of thousands (everyone from OMD to Yazoo, from Simple Minds to Talking Heads) and [the] nagging near-certainty that the guilty pair have real talent... meanwhile their good taste in pilfering is well worth investigating."

== Track listing ==
All songs written and composed by Neil Arthur and Stephen Luscombe.

=== 1982 UK LP and cassette ===
Side one

1. "I Can't Explain" – 4:00
2. "Feel Me" – 5:07
3. "I've Seen the Word" – 3:00
4. "Wasted" – 4:17
5. "Living on the Ceiling" – 4:11

Side two

1. "Waves" – 4:07 (original version on early pressings of the album is 4:25 long)
2. "Kind" – 3:56
3. "Sad Day" – 4:05
4. "Cruel" – 4:52
5. "God's Kitchen" – 2:54

=== 1982 Canadian version ===
Side one

1. "Waves" – 4:07
2. "Feel Me" – 5:07
3. "I've Seen the Word" – 3:00
4. "Wasted" – 4:17
5. "Living on the Ceiling" – 4:11

Side two

1. "Blind Vision" – 4:20
2. "I Can't Explain" – 4:00
3. "Kind" – 3:56
4. "Sad Day" – 4:05
5. "Cruel" – 4:52
6. "God's Kitchen" – 2:54

=== 2008 Happy Families... Plus CD ===
1. "I Can't Explain" – 4:03
2. "Feel Me" – 5:07
3. "I've Seen the Word" – 3:00
4. "Wasted" – 4:17
5. "Living on the Ceiling" – 4:02
6. "Waves" – 4:09
7. "Kind" – 3:58
8. "Sad Day" – 4:04
9. "Cruel" – 4:52
10. "God's Kitchen" – 2:57
11. "Living on the Ceiling" (Extended Version) – 5:40
12. "God's Kitchen" (12" Mix) – 4:29
13. "Feel Me" (Extended 12" Version) – 7:01
14. "Feel Me" (7" and 12" Instrumental) – 5:10
15. "Business Steps" – 4:28
16. "Feel Me" (US 12" Instrumental) – 5:22

=== 2017 Edsel 3 CD Media Book Edition ===
Disc one

1. "I Can't Explain" – 4:00
2. "Feel Me" – 5:07
3. "I've Seen the Word" – 3:00
4. "Wasted" – 4:17
5. "Living on the Ceiling" – 4:11
6. "Waves" – 4:07
7. "Kind" – 3:56
8. "Sad Day" – 4:05
9. "Cruel" – 4:52
10. "God's Kitchen" – 2:56
11. "Living On The Ceiling (Extended Version)" – 5:39
12. "God's Kitchen (12" Mix)" – 4:28
13. "Feel Me (12" Instrumental)" – 5:08
14. "Waves (Original Version - No Strings)" – 4:22

Disc two

1. "Sad Day (Original Version)" – 3:10
2. "Feel Me (Extended 12" Version)" – 6:59
3. "Business Steps" – 4:28
4. "Black Bell (Demo)" – 4:22
5. "Melodic Piece (Demo)" – 2:31
6. "Your Hills (Rehearsal)" – 2:46
7. "I Can't Explain (Demo)" – 3:20
8. "Waves (Demo)" – 4:45
9. "I've Seen the Word (1979 Demo)" – 3:06
10. "Holland (Demo)" – 2:47
11. "I've Seen the Word (Demo)" – 2:25
12. "Feel Me (Mike Howlett Dub Version)" – 6:48

Disc three

1. "I Would" – 4:06 [Radio 1 Session (13.2.82)]
2. "Living on the Ceiling" – 3:13 [Radio 1 Session (13.2.82)]
3. "Waves" – 4:01 [Radio 1 Session (13.2.82)]
4. "Running Thin" – 2:20 [Radio 1 Session (13.2.82)]
5. "God's Kitchen" – 2:54 [Radio 1 Session (5.6.82)]
6. "Feel Me" – 5:19 [Radio 1 Session (5.6.82)]
7. "Kind" – 3:48 [Radio 1 Session (5.6.82)]
8. "Cruel" – 3:49 [Radio 1 Session (5.6.82)]
9. "God's Kitchen" – 3:33 [In Concert, Paris Theatre (13.11.82)]
10. "Living on the Ceiling" – 4:33 [In Concert, Paris Theatre (13.11.82)]
11. "I've Seen the Word" – 3:36 [In Concert, Paris Theatre (13.11.82)]
12. "I Can't Explain" – 4:23 [In Concert, Paris Theatre (13.11.82)]
13. "Waves" – 4:38 [In Concert, Paris Theatre (13.11.82)]
14. "Feel Me" – 5:40 [In Concert, Paris Theatre (13.11.82)]

== Personnel ==
Credits are adapted from the Happy Families liner notes.

Blancmange

- Neil Arthur – vocals, guitars, electronics
- Stephen Luscombe – synthesizers, keyboards

Additional musicians

- David Rhodes – guitar on "I Can't Explain", "Feel Me", "Wasted", "Kind", "Cruel" and "God's Kitchen"
- James Lane – drums on "Living on the Ceiling" and "Kind"
- Stevie Lange – backing voices on "I Can't Explain", "Feel Me", "Waves" and "Kind"
- Madeline Bell – backing voices on "Feel Me" and "Waves"
- Joy Yates – backing voices on "I Can't Explain" and "Kind"
- Deepak (a.k.a. Deepak Khazanchi) – sitar on "Living on the Ceiling"
- Dinesh (a.k.a. Pandit Dinesh) – tabla on "Living on the Ceiling"

Production and artwork

- Engineered by Walter Samuel, Roberto Arendse and Mark Chamberlain (CBS)
  Nigel Green and Andrew Warwick (Battery)
- "Living on the Ceiling" and "Kind" remixed at Odyssey Studios by Denis Weinrich
- "Waves" remixed by Denis Weinrich and John Owen Williams, strings arranged by Linton Naiff
- Painting by Michael Brownlow after Louis Wain
- Management by Paul Smith and John Owen Williams

== Charts ==
Chart (1982–1983)	Peak position
Australian Albums (Kent Music Report)	17
Canadian Albums (RPM)	98
New Zealand Albums (RMNZ)	13
UK Albums (Official Charts)	30

== Release history ==
Region	Date	Label	Format	Catalog
United Kingdom	24 September 1982	London Records	LP/picture disc LP	SH 8552/SHPD 8552
United Kingdom	24 September 1982	London Records	cassette	KSAC 8552
United Kingdom	1987	London Records	CD	810 123-2
United Kingdom	1 September 2008	Edsel Records	remastered and expanded CD	EDSS 1026
United Kingdom	4 August 2017	Edsel Records	Deluxe 3CD Media Book Edition	EDSL0001
