= Unfurnished Rooms =

Studio album by Blancmange
- Released: 29 September 2017
- Length: 48:57
- Label: Blanc Check Records
- Producer: Neil Arthur, Benge

Blancmange chronology
| Commuter 23 (2016) | Unfurnished Rooms (2017) | Wanderlust (2018) |

Unfurnished Rooms is the ninth studio album by English band Blancmange, released in 2017. It was produced by Neil Arthur and Benge, and reached No. 40 on the UK Independent Albums Chart.

The album was Blancmange's first release since First Light, a 2017 collaborative album between Arthur and Benge, released under the name Fader. Speaking to MusicOMH in 2017, Arthur commented on Benge's involvement with Unfurnished Rooms: "It was fantastic when he said he was up for getting involved. I'd written the songs and a lot of instrumentation. I put my electronic noises on, and the idea was for Benge to replace the rhythm area."

== Critical reception ==
Professional ratings
Review scores
| Source | Rating |
|---|---|
| Louder Than War | 8.5/10 stars |
| The Quietus | favourable |
| Record Collector | 3/5 stars |

Upon release, Michael Hann of The Quietus described the album as "pleasing", adding: "...as if Blancmange have journeyed back to the early 1980s and taken a different turning". Paul Scott-Bates of Louder Than War summarised the album as "clever". He said: "It sees Neil Arthur on top form and putting together a listening experience that has taken thought, passion and a great deal of bravery." D Foist of Record Collector wrote: "Unfurnished Rooms still has the synthpop undercarriage, but feels more like an assured indie collection than anything else. A hint of glam pokes through here and there, but also a good dose of the stodgier end of Depeche Mode's output."

== Track listing ==
All tracks are written by Neil Arthur

| No. | Title | Length |
|---|---|---|
| 1. | "Unfurnished Rooms" | 4:46 |
| 2. | "We Are the Chemicals" | 5:16 |
| 3. | "Share It Out" | 4:11 |
| 4. | "What's The Time?" | 4:28 |
| 5. | "Wiping the Chair" | 4:34 |
| 6. | "Anna Dine" | 3:46 |
| 7. | "In December" | 4:48 |
| 8. | "Old Friends" | 5:27 |
| 9. | "Gratitude" | 3:37 |
| 10. | "Don't Get Me Wrong" | 8:09 |

== Chart performance ==
| Chart (2017) | Peak position |
|---|---|
| UK Independent Albums Chart | 40 |

== Personnel ==
- Neil Arthur - vocals, synthesiser, guitar, percussion, producer, recording, arrangement, mixing, artwork
- Benge - synthesiser, drum machine, producer, recording, arrangement, mixing
- David Rhodes - additional guitar (track 1–2, 4, 7–9)
- John Grant - piano, backing vocals (track 10)
- Shawn Joseph - mastering

Other

- Adam Yeldham - layout
- Steve Malins - management
