= Heaven Only Knows =

Heaven Only Knows may refer to:

- Heaven Only Knows (1947 film)
- Heaven Only Knows (album), an album by Teddy Pendergrass
- "Heaven Only Knows" (song), a 1989 song by Emmylou Harris
- "Heaven Only Knows", a song by k-os from his 2002 album Exit
- "Heaven Only Knows", a song by the Shangri-Las from their 1965 album Shangri-Las-65!
- "Heaven Only Knows", a song by Electric Light Orchestra from their 1986 album Balance of Power
- "Heaven Only Knows", a song by Richard Marx from his 1987 self-titled debut album

== See also ==
- Heaven Knows (disambiguation)
- "Heaven" (John Legend song), whose opening words are "Heaven only knows"
- "Only Heaven Knows", a song by Eddy Grant from Going for Broke
