= Believe You Me =

Studio album by Blancmange
- Released: 14 October 1985
- Recorded: May – August 1985
- Studio: AIR (London); Garden (London); Island (London); Redan (London); Roundhouse (London); Strongroom (London); Wessex Sound (London)
- Genre: New wave; synth-pop; techno-pop
- Length: 45:09
- Label: London
- Producer: Stewart Levine^{(1)} Neil Arthur & John Williams^{(2)} Stephen Luscombe

Blancmange chronology
Mange Tout (1984)	Believe You Me (1985)	Second Helpings (1990)

Singles from Believe You Me
- 1. "What's Your Problem" Released: 26 August 1985; 2. "Lose Your Love" Released: 28 October 1985

Believe You Me is the third studio album by the English synth-pop duo Blancmange, released on 14 October 1985 on LP and cassette by London Records, followed by compact disc on 2 December 1985. A remastered edition was released by Edsel Records in 2008, which featured the album along with four bonus tracks.

== Critical reception ==
Professional ratings
Review scores
Source	Rating
AllMusic	4.5/5 stars
Louder Than War	8.5/10 stars
Record Mirror	4/5 stars
Smash Hits	8/10 stars

Upon release, Simon Braithwaite of Smash Hits stated: "Blancmange have come back with a selection of songs so varied yet simple that they make the whole thing seem practically effortless. Still there are the infernally catchy synthesized dance tracks and ballads but they've also introduced a lot more string arrangements." Mark Booker of Number One commented: "One of the few 'synth' bands who realise that the synth can't do everything, Blancmange have roped in a horde of guest artistes to complement their fine talents and serve up a delicious platter." Billboard stated: "Synth duo gets some help from friends, most notably guitarist David Rhodes, but their relaxed sound proves a little too relaxed to encourage listener involvement, despite some fine playing."

In a retrospective review, Bill Cassel of AllMusic wrote: "Believe You Me is leaner, subtler, and more organic [compared to Mange Tout (1984)], without straying too far from their established sound. Neil Arthur's vocals are stronger, and his and Stephen Luscombe's songwriting is more focused. The result might best be described as "mature techno-pop"." Paul Scott-Bates of Louder Than War considered the album to be "filled with absolute gems and remains truly underrated to this day". He added: "Produced by Stewart Levine, it raised the bar in terms of sparkling production and should have seen the band catapulted into the next level of success."

== Track listing ==
All songs written by Neil Arthur and Stephen Luscombe.

=== LP: LONLP 10 ===
==== Side one ====
1. "Lose Your Love" – 4:09
2. "What's Your Problem?" – 4:13
3. "Paradise Is" – 3:48
4. "Why Don't They Leave Things Alone?" – 4:35
5. "22339" – 5:23 ^{(1)}

==== Side two ====
1. "Don't You Love It All" – 4:35
2. "Believe" – 3:49
3. "Lorraine's My Nurse" – 2:31
4. "Other Animals" – 4:19
5. "No Wonder They Never Made It Back" – 3:31 ^{(1)}
6. "John" – 4:16 ^{(2)}

=== CD: 820 301–2 ===
1. "Lose Your Love" – 4:09
2. "What's Your Problem?" – 4:13
3. "Paradise Is" – 3:48
4. "Why Don't They Leave Things Alone?" – 4:35
5. "22339" – 5:23 ^{(1)}
6. "Don't You Love It All" – 4:35
7. "Believe" – 3:49
8. "Lorraine's My Nurse" – 2:31
9. "Other Animals" – 4:19
10. "No Wonder They Never Made It Back!" – 3:31 ^{(1)}
11. "John" – 4:16 ^{(2)}

=== 2008 Edsel – Remastered CD: EDSS 1027 ===
1. "Lose Your Love" – 4:04
2. "What's Your Problem?" – 4:09
3. "Paradise Is" – 3:49
4. "Why Don't They Leave Things Alone?" – 4:36
5. "22339" – 7:01
6. "Don't You Love It All" – 4:32
7. "Believe" – 3:48
8. "Lorraine's My Nurse" – 2:31
9. "Other Animals" – 4:33
10. "No Wonder They Never Made It Back!" – 4:33
11. "John" – 4:24
12. "Side Two" – 7:50*
13. "Mixing on the Ceiling" [Megamix] – 7:08*
14. "I Can See It (Why Don't They Leave Things Alone)" [Extended] – 7:54*
15. "Scream Down the House" – 4:07*
- Bonus Tracks* 12–15

== Personnel ==
=== Musicians ===
- Neil Arthur
- Stephen Luscombe

=== Additional musicians ===
- David Rhodes – guitar (1, 2, 3, 4, 5, 6, 7, 9)
- Justin Hildreth – drums (1, 4, 6)
- Hugh Masekela – flugelhorn (6)
- Ronnie Ross – baritone saxophone (9)
- Francis Foster – congas, tambourine (1, 6)
- Pandit Dinesh – tablas, madal (10)
- Katie Kissoon – background voice (6)
- Stevie Lange – background voice (6)
- London Community Gospel Choir – background voices (9)
- Dick Cuthell – trumpet, flugelhorn, cornet, brass arrangement (10)
- Tony Pleeth – cello (4, 10)
- Simon Elliston – flute (4)
- Lynton Naiff – string arrangement (8)
- Gavin Wright – violin (8)
- Dick Morgan – oboe (8)
- Anthea Cox – flute (8)
- Steve Maw – bassoon (8)
- Nigel Warren-Green – cello (8)
- Paul Webb – bass (5)
- Debbie McGee – triangle (5)

=== Production ===
- Recorded in London from May to August 1985 at Air, Garden, Island, Redan, Roundhouse, Strongroom and Wessex Studios
- Produced by Stewart Levine for Ultradelta Limited
  ^{(1)} "22339" and "No Wonder They Never Made It Back" produced by Neil Arthur & John Williams
  ^{(2)} "John" produced by Stephen Luscombe
- Engineered by Femi J
- Assistant Engineers: Karl Lever (Air)
  Pete Griffiths (Garden)
  Stephen Street (Island)
  Johnny Schinas (Redan)
  David Kemp (Roundhouse)
  Phil Bodger (Strongroom)
- Management by Paul Williams, Paul Smith and Jolyan Burnham
- 'Mask' construction by Annie Symons @ Manifest
- Photography by Mike Owen
- Designs by Assorted Images

== Chart performance ==
Chart (1985–1986)	Peak position
Canadian Albums Chart	73
UK Albums Chart	54
