= Semi Detached (Blancmange album) =

Studio album by Blancmange
- Released: 23 March 2015
- Length: 46:32
- Label: Cherry Red Records
- Producer: Neil Arthur

Blancmange chronology
Happy Families Too... (2013)	Semi Detached (2015)	Nil by Mouth (2015)

Semi Detached is the sixth studio album by British Synth-pop band Blancmange, released in 2015. The album was the first to be created without the involvement of original member Stephen Luscombe due to his health problems. Neil Arthur commenced writing material for the album in 2013-14, with recording taking place during 2014. The album reached No. 22 in the UK Independent Albums Chart.

"Paddington" was released as the album's first single on 9 March 2015. A music video was produced to promote the single, directed by Tone Davies. The second single, "Useless", was released on 15 May, followed by "I Want More", released on 18 April as a limited edition 12" single for Record Store Day.

== Critical reception ==
Professional ratings
Review scores
Source	Rating
AllMusic	3/5 stars
The Arts Desk	4/5 stars
Louder Than War	9/10 stars
Mojo	4/5 stars
MusicOMH	3/5 stars
Q	3/5 stars
Record Collector	3/5 stars
Uncut	3/5 stars

Upon release, David Jeffries of AllMusic considered the album to be a "very dark Blancmange album when compared to all the others, and quite emotionally heavy as well". He added: "Semi Detached is sincere in its distrust, distaste, and ire, and the album winds up a worthy companion for bad days or chucking it all." Paul Scott-Bates of Louder Than War commented: "Arthur's Northern quirk is present throughout Semi Detached though the overall feel is darker. [It] is a modern day riposte to the Blancmange of the 80s. Still catchy, still infectious but now all grown up."

Mark Elliott of Record Collector commented: "Semi Detached is a darker, icier project than any Blancmange have previously served up. A long distance from their frothier 80s form, it’s a set that shows Neil Arthur is more than capable of keeping this band on our radar for some time yet." Graeme Marsh of MusicOMH wrote: "if you fancy a slightly off centre alternative to the mass appeal of more prominent electronic bands, despite a few wobbly bits here and there, then you won't go far wrong with giving this latest collection a chance."

== Track listing ==
No.	Title	Writer(s)	Length
1.	"The Fall"	Neil Arthur, Graham Henderson	8:08
2.	"I Want More"	Michael Karoli, Irmin Schmidt, Holger Czukay, Jaki Liebezeit, Peter Gilmour	3:57
3.	"Paddington"	Arthur	3:56
4.	"It Didn't Take Long"	Arthur	4:24
5.	"MKS Lover"	Arthur	4:17
6.	"Like I Do"	Arthur	3:34
7.	"Deep in the Mine"	Arthur	4:43
8.	"Acid"	Arthur	4:23
9.	"Useless"	Arthur	3:27
10.	"Bloody Hell Fire"	Arthur	5:48

Deluxe edition - disc two
No.	Title	Writer(s)	Length
1.	"I Want Your Love" (Extended Version)	Bernard Edwards, Nile Rodgers	6:43
2.	"Silk Sea"	Arthur	3:29
3.	"That Worm"	Arthur	5:12
4.	"Paddington" (Extended Version)		5:36
5.	"I Want More" (Extended Version)		7:15
6.	"Like I Do" (Extended Version)		4:50
7.	"Useless" (Extended Version)		4:36
8.	"Paddington" (Alternative Edit)		4:04
9.	"I Want Your Love"		5:16

== Chart performance ==
Chart (2015)	Peak position
UK Independent Albums Chart	22

== Personnel ==
- Neil Arthur - lead vocals, keyboards
- David Rhodes - guitar
- Jake Parker - backing vocals
- Eleanor Arthur - backing vocals (track 3), additional vocals (track 2)
- Helen Kincaid, Joe Arthur, Tony Brook, Harvey Brook, Reed Wilson, Rupert Howe - additional vocals (track 2)

Production

- Adam Fuest - mixing
- Neil Arthur - producer
- Tim Debney - mastering

Other

- Adam Yeldham - artwork
- Helen Kincaid - asteroid painting
- Steve Malins - management
