= Wanderlust (Blancmange album) =

Studio album by Blancmange
- Released: 19 October 2018
- Length: 45:52
- Label: Blanc Check Records
- Producer: Neil Arthur, Benge

Blancmange chronology
| Unfurnished Rooms (2017) | Wanderlust (2018) | Nil by Mouth 2 (2020) |

Wanderlust is the tenth studio album by British synth-pop band Blancmange, released in 2018. It was produced by Neil Arthur and Benge, and reached No. 22 on the UK Independent Albums Chart. The single "Not a Priority" features Hannah Peel on backing vocals.

== Critical reception ==
Professional ratings
Review scores
| Source | Rating |
|---|---|
| Louder Than War | favourable |
| MusicOMH | 4/5 stars |
| The Spill Magazine | 4.5/5 stars |

Upon release, Paul Scott-Bates of Louder Than War wrote: "...if anything, this album is potentially [Neil Arthur's] finest work. It is sparse whilst having depth, it is humorous whilst maintaining seriousness, but most importantly of all, it shows a man on the top of his game." Aaron Badgley of The Spill Magazine commented: "Wanderlust is a brilliant album, and it does not sound like any other Blancmange album. Arthur, along with Benge has created a rather dark and at times frightening album. In its darkness, it is quite beautiful."

Nick Smith of MusicOMH considered Wanderlust to be a "brilliant album", containing "dark and inspired comment on modern life". He also felt the album was reminiscent of the 2009 album Yeah Ghost by Zero 7. Patrick Clarke of The Quietus noted: "Wanderlust may be hit and miss, in terms of seizing its own momentum and blending Arthur's left-field writing with its steely electronica, but it shimmers with personality."

== Track listing ==
All tracks are written by Neil Arthur and Benge.

| No. | Title | Length |
|---|---|---|
| 1. | "Distant Storm" | 5:31 |
| 2. | "In Your Room" | 3:53 |
| 3. | "I Smashed Your Phone" | 4:43 |
| 4. | "Gravel Drive Syndrome" | 3:55 |
| 5. | "Talking to Machines" | 5:22 |
| 6. | "Not a Priority" | 4:30 |
| 7. | "TV Debate" | 3:44 |
| 8. | "Leaves" | 4:22 |
| 9. | "White Circle, Black Hole" | 4:42 |
| 10. | "Wanderlust" | 5:30 |

== Personnel ==
- Neil Arthur – vocals, synthesiser, guitar, percussion, producer, mixing, arrangement, design
- Benge – synthesiser, drum machine, producer, mixing, arrangement
- David Rhodes – guitar (track 8)
- Hannah Peel – backing vocals (track 6)
- Shawn Joseph – mastering

Other

- Paul Agar – design

== Charts ==
| Chart (2018) | Peak position |
|---|---|
| UK Independent Albums Chart | 22 |
