= Commuter 23 =

Studio album by Blancmange
- Released: 11 March 2016
- Length: 58:24
- Label: Blanc Check Records
- Producer: Neil Arthur

Blancmange chronology
Nil by Mouth (2015)	Commuter 23 (2016)	Unfurnished Rooms (2017)

Commuter 23 is the eighth studio album by British Synth-pop band Blancmange, released in 2016. The album reached No. 38 in the UK Independent Albums Chart.

In December 2016, the album was followed by the EP Red Shift, which features a reworking of four tracks from Commuter 23: "Red Shift", "Judge Mental", "Jack Knife" and "Last Night (I Dreamt I Had a Job)".

== Critical reception ==
Professional ratings
Review scores
Source	Rating
The Arts Desk	3/5 stars
Louder Than War	9/10 stars
MusicOMH	3/5 stars
Record Collector	4/5 stars

Upon release, Graeme Marsh of MusicOMH commented: "Whilst Nil by Mouth was entirely instrumental, Commuter 23 walks a similar path but this time adds back in the odd vocal here and there. It dabbles in ambience and experimentation as before, as well as minimalism, synth soundscapes and occasional downright weirdness but with – in the main – a more humane feel." Paul Scott-Bates of Louder Than War wrote: "Commuter 23 sees Blancmange continue to mature. As Arthur continues well into his fifties, so the music develops beyond the perfect pop of the 80s and further into a more comfortable sounding, often experimental phase."

Ian Shirley of Record Collector described Commuter 23 as a "compelling earful [and] musically a wide-ranging collection". Thomas H Green of The Arts Desk commented that the album had a "classy retro-futurism, in the same way that OMD's last album English Electric did. Blancmange now successfully mine a territory somewhere between John Foxx, Kraftwerk and 1990s post-clubbing analogue ambience."

== Track listing ==
All tracks are written by Neil Arthur.

No.	Title	Length
1.	"Red Shift (Blame Thrower)"	5:17
2.	"Flight 2157"	2:10
3.	"Commuter 23"	4:07
4.	"I Wish I Was You"	4:45
5.	"Last Night (I Dreamt I Had a Job)"	4:58
6.	"Jack Knife"	5:51
7.	"Elemental Change"	3:49
8.	"Waiting All the Time"	5:14
9.	"NHS"	2:10
10.	"It'll Pass Maybe"	4:32
11.	"Judge Mental"	3:03
12.	"Scarred"	4:09
13.	"St Paul's"	2:26
14.	"Time Day_Night"	5:53

== Chart performance ==
Chart (2016)	Peak position
UK Independent Albums Chart	38

== Personnel ==
- Neil Arthur - lead vocals, keyboards, recording, mixing, artwork
- Joe Caithness - mastering

Other

- Adam Yeldham - artwork
- Helen Kincaid - asteroid painting
- Steve Malins - management
