= Nil by Mouth (album) =

Studio album by Blancmange
- Released: 25 September 2015
- Length: 45:23
- Label: Blanc Check Records
- Producer: Neil Arthur

Blancmange chronology
Semi Detached (2015)	Nil by Mouth (2015)	Commuter 23 (2016)

Nil by Mouth is the seventh studio album by English band Blancmange, released in 2015. The album is made up of instrumental tracks, including a 2005 re-recording of "Holiday Camp", a Blancmange track from the 1980 EP Irene & Mavis.

Nil by Mouth was originally made available at Blancmange's two concerts at the Red Gallery, London, on 15 and 16 May. The album was later given a full release digitally and on CD in September.

== Critical reception ==
Professional ratings
Review scores
Source	Rating
The Arts Desk	3/5 stars
MusicOMH	3.5/5 stars
Record Collector	3/5 stars

Upon release, Andy Jex of MusicOMH wrote: "Nil by Mouth is a reminder of where Blancmange originally came from; very much born of the DIY improvisation of the kitchen sink recording that typified their earlier years. This is stripped-down, bare bones Blancmange with music evoking films never written, scenes never soundtracked and popcorn never eaten." Caspar Gomez of The Arts Desk stated: "The results are more entertaining and gripping than Blancmange's last "proper" album. It's not essential fare, but it does put a smile on the face." Mark Elliott of Record Collector concluded: "Nil by Mouth offers no suggestion that Blancmange will be heading out on the revival circuit anytime soon."

== Track listing ==
All tracks are written by Neil Arthur, except "Holiday Camp (2005)" written by Arthur and Stephen Luscombe

No.	Title	Length
1.	"Eleanor"	3:33
2.	"Fall"	5:58
3.	"R and P"	3:11
4.	"Cistern"	3:24
5.	"Gone"	3:17
6.	"Crystals of Zircon"	4:01
7.	"The Son"	4:06
8.	"Matters of Life"	2:03
9.	"Holiday Camp (2005)"	3:27
10.	"Landsea"	2:53
11.	"So Long Ago"	5:56
12.	"Close Encounters"	3:39

== Personnel ==
- Neil Arthur - instrumentation, mixing, recording
- Stephen Luscombe - instrumentation (track 9)
- Dallas Simpson - mastering

Other

- Adam Yeldham - artwork
- Helen Kincaid - painting
- Steve Malins - management
