= Mange Tout =

Studio album by Blancmange
- Released: 18 May 1984
- Recorded: August–November 1983
- Studios: Marcus Music, London (Note: Except "Don't Tell Me" and "Time Became the Tide"); Sigma Sound, New York City; Island, London (Note: "Time Became the Tide"); Sarm East, London (Note: "Don't Tell Me")
- Genre: Synth-pop
- Length: 43:26
- Label: London
- Producers: Blancmange ("Game Above My Head"); Peter Collins ("Don't Tell Me"); John Luongo (all others); John Owen Williams ("Game Above My Head")

Blancmange chronology
Happy Families (1982)	Mange Tout (1984)	Believe You Me (1985)

Singles from Mange Tout
- 1. "Blind Vision" Released: 29 April 1983; 2. "That's Love, That It Is" Released: 18 November 1983; 3. "Don't Tell Me" Released: 6 April 1984; 4. "The Day Before You Came" Released: 6 July 1984

Professional ratings
Review scores
Source	Rating
AllMusic	3/5 stars
Record Mirror	3/5 stars
Smash Hits	9/10 stars

Mange Tout is the second studio album by the English synth-pop duo Blancmange, released on 18 May 1984 by London Records. It was Blancmange's most successful studio album, peaking at number eight on the UK Albums Chart and was certified Gold by the British Phonographic Industry (BPI) on 25 January 1985 for sales in excess of 100,000 copies. The album contained four UK top-40 singles, two of which reached the top 10. The fourth single to be released and final track on the album is a cover version of ABBA's song "The Day Before You Came".

In addition to the usual vinyl and cassette release, a limited-edition vinyl picture disc was also released. The album was later released on CD, and a remastered deluxe edition was released by Edsel Records in 2008, which featured a second disc of remixes and B-sides.

== Track listing ==
All tracks are written by Neil Arthur and Stephen Luscombe, except "The Day Before You Came", written by Benny Andersson and Björn Ulvaeus.

Side one
No.	Title	Length
1.	"Don't Tell Me"	3:31
2.	"Game Above My Head"	3:58
3.	"Blind Vision"	3:56
4.	"Time Became the Tide"	4:49
5.	"That's Love, That It Is"	4:22

Side two
No.	Title	Length
6.	"Murder"	5:58
7.	"See the Train"	2:04
8.	"All Things Are Nice"	4:59
9.	"My Baby"	3:59
10.	"The Day Before You Came"	5:50
Total length:		43:26

2008 CD reissue disc one (bonus track)
No.	Title	Length
11.	"Game Above My Head" (long version)	7:13

2008 CD reissue disc two
No.	Title	Length
1.	"Blind Vision" (long version)	9:39
2.	"Heaven Knows Where Heaven Is"	3:24
3.	"On Our Way To?"	5:37
4.	"That's Love That It Is" (extended)	6:35
5.	"Vishnu" (full length)	5:20
6.	"That's Love That It Is" (remix)	7:34
7.	"Vishnu" (instrumental)	4:52
8.	"Don't Tell Me" (extended)	6:25
9.	"Get Out of That"	4:26
10.	"Feel Me" (live version)	6:25
11.	"All Things Are Nice" (version)	4:24
12.	"The Day Before You Came" (extended)	7:59

== Personnel ==
Blancmange

- Neil Arthur – voice; drums; clarinet
- Stephen Luscombe – electric keyboards; piano; trumpet
- Blancmange – arrangement (track 4)

Additional musicians

- Pandit Dinesh – tabla (tracks 1, 6, 8, 10); madal (track 1); percussion (track 8)
- Deepak Khazanchi – sitar (tracks 1, 6); santoor (track 10)
- Bobby Collins – bass guitar (track 2)
- David Rhodes – guitars (tracks 3, 5, 6, 8, 9)
- The Uptown Horns – horns (track 3)
- Neil Jason – bass guitar (tracks 3, 9)
- Bashiri Johnson – percussion (tracks 3–5); bells (track 4)
- Dolette McDonald – background voices (tracks 3, 6)
- Brenda Jay Nelson – background voices (track 3)
- Jocelyn Brown – background voices (track 3)
- Gavyn Wright – violins (track 4)
- Roy Gillard – violins (track 4)
- Garf Jackson – viola (track 4)
- Nigel Warren Green – cello (track 4)
- Andy Findon – flute (track 4)
- Linton Naiff – arrangement (track 4)
- Joe Mosello – trumpet (tracks 5, 9)
- Vinnie Della-Rocca – saxophones (tracks 5, 9)
- Jim Clouse – saxophones (tracks 5, 9)
- Keith O'Quinn – trombone (tracks 5, 9)
- Jack Gale – trombone (tracks 5, 9)
- James Biondolillo – maestro (tracks 5, 9)
- Jerry Marotta – percussion (tracks 5, 9)
- Tawatha Agee – background voices (track 5)
- Brenda White – background voices (track 5)
- Vernice – background voices (track 5)
- Malcolm Ross – guitars (track 6)
- David McClymont – bass guitar (track 6)
- Michelle Cobbs – background voices (track 6)
- Janice Pendarvis – background voices (track 6)
- Dave Allen – bass guitar (track 8)
- Blair Cunningham – hi-hat (track 8); percussion (track 9)
- Valery Ponomarev – trumpet solo (track 10)

Technical

- Peter Collins – production (track 1)
- Blancmange – production (track 2)
- John Owen Williams – production (track 2); remix (track 9)
- John Luongo – production (tracks 3–10)
- Dennis Weinreich – remix (track 9)
- Jay Mark – engineering (tracks 2, 3, 5–10)
- Femi Jiya – engineering in London (tracks 2, 3, 5–10)
- Matthew Wallace – engineering assistance in London (tracks 2, 3, 5–10)
- Richard Digby Smith – engineering (track 4)
- Stephen Street – engineering assistance (track 4)
- Julian Mendelsohn – engineering (track 1)
- James Doherty – engineering in New York (tracks 2, 3, 5–10)
- Michael Hutchinson – engineering in New York (tracks 2, 3, 5–10)
- John Potoker – engineering in New York (tracks 2, 3, 5–10)
- Linda Randazzo – engineering assistance in New York (tracks 2, 3, 5–10)
- Jimmy Santis – engineering assistance in New York (tracks 2, 3, 5–10)
- Elisa Gura – engineering assistance in New York (tracks 2, 3, 5–10)
- Melanie West – engineering assistance in New York (tracks 2, 3, 5–10)
- Glenn Rosenstein – engineering assistance in New York (tracks 2, 3, 5–10)

Artwork

- Martyn Atkins – design
- Marcx – design

== Charts ==
=== Weekly charts ===
Weekly chart performance for Mange Tout
Chart (1984)	Peak position
Canada Top Albums/CDs (RPM)	41
Dutch Albums (Album Top 100)	16
European Albums (Music & Media)	21
German Albums (Offizielle Top 100)	28
New Zealand Albums (RMNZ)	46
UK Albums (Official Charts)	8

=== Year-end charts ===
Year-end chart performance for Mange Tout
Chart (1984)	Position
UK Albums (Gallup)	99

== Certifications ==
Region	Certification	Certified units/sales
United Kingdom (BPI)	Gold	100,000^{^}
^{^} Shipments figures based on certification alone.
