= Benge (musician) =

British musician (born 1967)

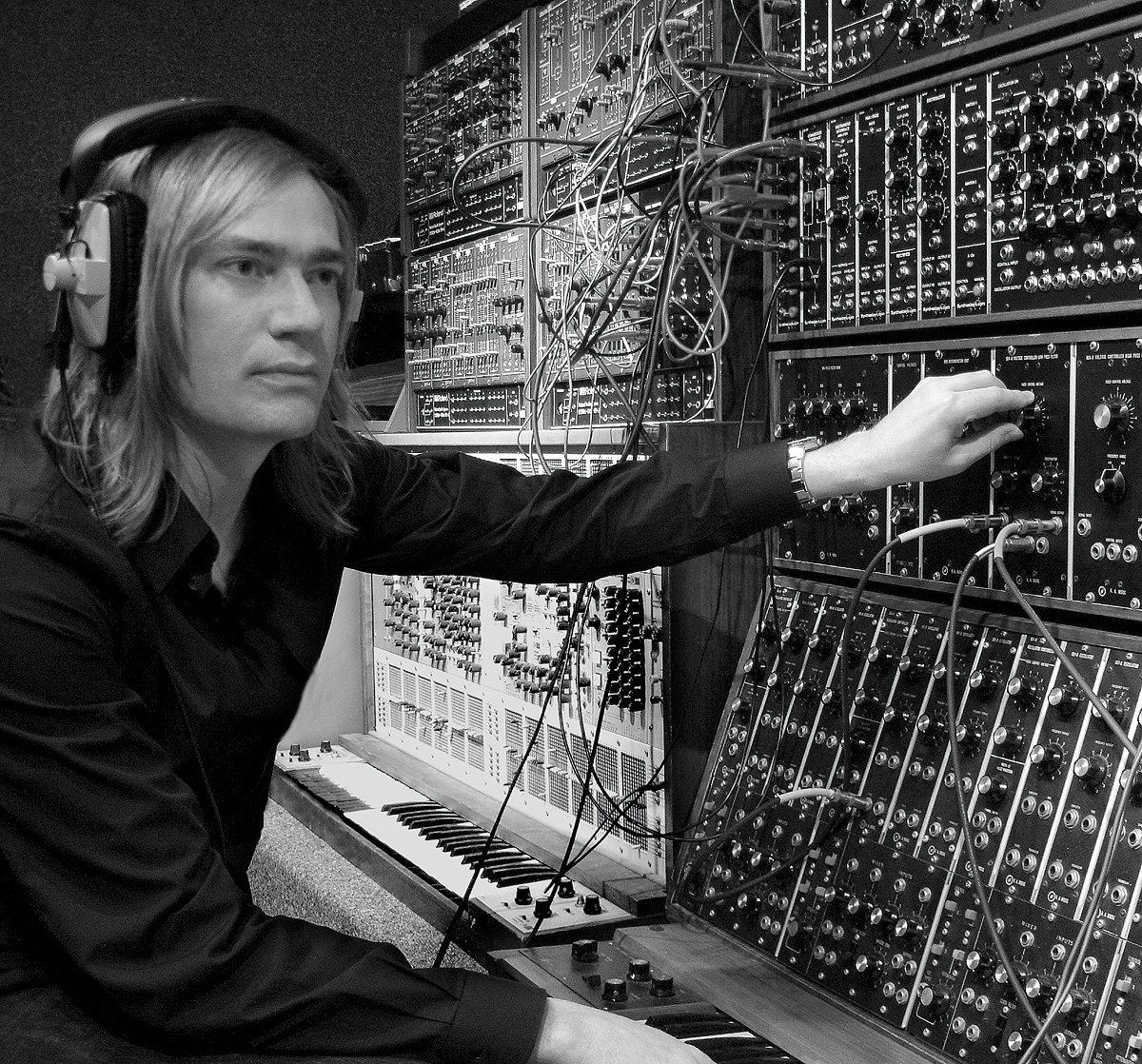
Benge in his electronic Memetune studio, London, 2008

Benjamin David Edwards (born 1967), known professionally as Benge, is an English musician and record producer based in Cornwall, England. The main focus of his work is within the experimental electronic music field.

== Solo career ==
Benge launched the record label Expanding Records as an outlet for his debut album Electro-orgoustic Music in 1995. The label, which focuses on instrumental electronic music, continued to grow to include a roster of approximately 20 artists from around the world. He also runs a music studio called Memetune Studios which houses a large collection of vintage electronic synthesisers and other recording equipment.

In 2008, Benge released his tenth studio album Twenty Systems, a concept album which featured twenty tracks made on twenty different synthesisers between the years 1968 and 1988 and an accompanying book describing the instruments and the development of the synthesiser in general. The album was called 'a brilliant contribution to the archaeology of electronic music' by Brian Eno.

Since 2012, Benge has released a regular series of online solo albums via his bandcamp and iTunes pages. These albums regularly feature his "one-synthesiser-per-album" concept, whereby he limits himself to creating a full album using a single electronic music system, thereby developing the idea he introduced with Twenty Systems in 2008.

== Benge solo albums ==
| Title | Record label | Year |
|---|---|---|
| Electro-orgoustic Music | Expanding Records | 1995 |
| Beautiful Electronic Music | Expanding Records | 1996 |
| Polyrythmic Electronica | Expanding Records | 1996 |
| I, Computor | Expanding Records | 1997 |
| Home Music | Expanding Records | 1998 |
| The Very Best of Benge | Sub Rosa / Quatermass | 1999 |
| Experimental Non-Vocal Electronic Pop | Expanding Records | 1999 |
| Silicon Valleys | Sub Rosa / Quatermass | 2000 |
| Meme Tunes | Expanding Records | 2002 |
| I Am 9 | Expanding Records | 2005 |
| Twenty Systems | Expanding Records | 2008 |
| Abstraxa | Expanding Records / iTunes | 2012 |
| Harmuna | Expanding Records / iTunes | 2012 |
| Minurtua | Expanding Records / iTunes | 2012 |
| Rebisus | Expanding Records / iTunes | 2012 |
| Chimeror | Expanding Records / iTunes | 2013 |
| Forms One | Expanding Records / iTunes | 2013 |
| Forms 2 - Earthmoves | Expanding Records / iTunes | 2013 |
| Forms 3 - Controls, Sources & Treatments | Expanding Records / iTunes | 2013 |
| Sulieo | Expanding Records / iTunes | 2014 |
| Loop Series One | Expanding Records / iTunes | 2014 |
| Minimalist Work (Sustained Tone Branch) | Expanding Records / iTunes | 2014 |
| Loop Series 2: Films, Layers | Expanding Records / iTunes | 2014 |
| Moor Music | Expanding Records / iTunes | 2015 |
| Forms Five: Shapes in Space | Expanding Records / iTunes | 2016 |
| Forms Six: Works on Paper | Expanding Records / iTunes | 2017 |
| Tone Flow | Expanding Records / iTunes | 2018 |
| Thirteen Systems | Self-released | 2020 |

== Production career and Memetune Studios ==
Over the years Benge has amassed a large collection of electronic synthesisers, drum machines and studio equipment which is housed in his 'Memetune Studio Complex', from where he writes and records his own music as well as his many collaborations.

Benge's first work as collaborator and producer was the 1999 synth-pop experiment entitled Volume (with Richard Lee and Paul Elliott). Since then he has regularly worked on collaborative projects, inviting people to co-write, record and mix studio albums and EPs.

He has also been involved in the production of other artist's records which were recorded at his Memetune studio. Albums by Tunng, Beth Jeans Houghton and Hannah Peel have all been recorded and mixed there with Benge's involvement (alongside Mike Lindsay of Tunng). Benge has also co-produced an album by singer songwriter Serafina Steer, Change is Good.

Benge co-wrote and produced an album with John Foxx (founder of Ultravox!) released in early 2011 under the name John Foxx & The Maths. The album Interplay gained wide critical acclaim. Benge has also performed live with John Foxx and The Maths, including a nine date UK tour, plus festivals in Poland and Belgium. A second album The Shape of Things by John Foxx and the Maths was released prior to the tour in October 2011, and was initially on sale at concerts only. A live performance with John Foxx and the Maths at The Roundhouse in London in June 2010 was captured on the CD/DVD release Analogue Circuit: Live At The Roundhouse (2012). Two further albums Evidence (2012) and Rhapsody (2013) have been released, the latter made up of recorded live at Benge's MemeTune Studios in November 2011. The band won the annual Artrocker Magazine award for Best Electronic Band in 2012.

He has further collaborated with John Foxx and classical violinist Diana Yukawa releasing the album Codex under the collective name of Ghost Harmonic in 2015.

2017 saw the release of five albums (John Foxx & the Maths - The Machine, Fader - First Light, I Speak Machine - Zombies 1985, Lone Taxidermist - Trifle, Blancmange - Unfurnished Rooms) and the recording of three more albums due for release in 2018 (Creep Show ft. John Grant - Mr Dynamite, Oblong - The Sea at Night, Wrangler - A Situation). The Lone Taxidermist LP reached No. 9 in The Quietus top 100 albums of 2017. The Blancmange, Fader, Lone Taxidermist and I Speak Machine albums all made the Electronic Sound magazine best-albums-of-2017 list, reaching No. 8, 13, 21 and 23 respectively.

As of 2018, Benge has recorded collaborative albums under the following names: Volume (with Richard Lee and Paul Elliott), Tennis (with Douglas Benford), Stendec (with Paul Merritt), Oblong (with Dave Nice and Sid Stronach), Wrangler (with Phil Winter of Tunng, and Stephen Mallinder), Fader (with Neil Arthur), Creep Show (with Wrangler and John Grant), as well as his continuing work with John Foxx as The Maths. His production and writing credits include Serafina Steer, The Magnetic North, Hannah Peel, Laura J Martin, Gazelle Twin, I Speak Machine, Lone Taxidermist and Blancmange. In 2017 Benge began working with John Grant on his fourth solo album. This album entitled Love Is Magic was released on 12 October 2018.

The trio of Benge, Vince Clarke and Neil Arthur as the supergroup Doublespeak released their self-titled debut album on 29 May 2026.

== Discography of collaborative albums ==
- Volume | Computer Gun | Expanding Records | 1999
- Volume | Evolver | Expanding Records | 2000
- Tennis | Wooden Sweets | Electro-Chemical Research | 2000
- Tennis | Europe on Horseback | Bip Hop | 2001
- Tennis | Furlines | Bip Hop | 2003
- Stendec | A Study of And | Expanding Records | 2004
- Smoke Fairies | Strange the Things | Concentrated People | 2005
- Oblong | Indicator | Expanding Records | 2006
- Serafina Steer | Change is Good | Static Caravan | 2010
- John Foxx & the Maths | Interplay | Metamatic Recordings | 2011
- John Foxx & the Maths | The Shape of Things | Metamatic Recordings | 2011
- John Foxx & the Maths | Evidence | Metamatic Recordings | 2012
- Wrangler | LA Spark | MemeTune | 2014
- Ghost Harmonic | Codex | Metamatic Records | 2015
- Wrangler | White Glue | MemeTune | 2016
- John Foxx & the Maths | The Bunker Tapes | Memetune | 2016
- John Foxx & the Maths | The Machine | Metamatic Recordings | 2017
- Fader | First Light | Blanc Check | 2017
- Lone Taxidermist | Trifle | MemeTune | 2017
- I Speak Machine | Zombies 1985 | Lex Records | 2017
- Blancmange | Unfurnished Rooms | Blanc Check | 2017
- Creep Show | Mr Dynamite | Bella Union | 2018
- John Grant | Love Is Magic | Bella Union | 2018
- Doublespeak | Doublespeak | 2026

== The Memetune Programme ==
In 2023 Benge launched a series of 40 minute documentary episodes on his YouTube channel (https://www.youtube.com/@memetunestudio) which focus on his Memetune studio activities. Each episode is broken down into different segments, covering areas of interest such as the history of synthesisers, modular synth patching, music production and the use of vintage video gear which Benge uses to make his videos.

As of 2026 there have been 3 series of the Memetune Programme, with a total of 18 episodes.

For each six-part series, Benge publishes a hard-back colour 'Annual' to accompany and summarise the content of the episodes, which also contains a link to a musical album.
