= What's Your Problem =

Single by Blancmange

from the album Believe You Me
- B-side: "Side Two"
- Released: 26 August 1985
- Genre: Synth-pop
- Length: 4:12
- Label: London
- Songwriters: Neil Arthur; Stephen Luscombe
- Producer: Stewart Levine

Blancmange singles chronology
"The Day Before You Came" (1984)	"What's Your Problem" (1985)	"Lose Your Love" (1985)

"What's Your Problem" is a song by the English synth-pop duo Blancmange, released on 26 August 1985 as the lead single from their third studio album Believe You Me (1985). It was written by Neil Arthur and Stephen Luscombe, and produced by Stewart Levine. "What's Your Problem" reached No. 40 in the UK and No. 30 in Ireland. A music video was filmed to promote the single, which received heavy action play on the European music TV channel Music Box.

== Background ==
In a 1985 interview with Smash Hits, Arthur said of the song's lyrics, "It's about me actually, though I tried to make it sound as if I was singing to someone else. The bit 'when you were flying high you never wanted to look down' is about when I was up there and I never wanted to look down, never wanted to keep in touch with friends. But what happens is that you reach rock bottom, low ebb, and suddenly you feel like you're going to explode because you realise what a bastard you've been to people."

== Critical reception ==
On its release, Dave Rimmer of Smash Hits selected the single as "single of the fortnight". He commented, "Thought this sounded sadly weedy at first, like a poor cross between a dated Abba job and a very old Eno song, but I was wrong. On further hearings I found myself warbling along with what turns out to be one of those rousing refrains that simply will not leave you alone." Karen Swayne of Number One said, "Blancmange re-emerge with a drab outing that sounds more like a Depeche Mode reject than a potential hit. Informed opinion reckons it's a grower, but I thought boring electro like this had died a painless death a few years back, though Neil and Stephen seem intent on reviving it."

Andy Strickland of Record Mirror wrote, "You'd have a job getting too excited about this one as it treads familiar and unspectacular ground. Even Neil's voice seems to have lost some of its old fire." Jerry Smith of Music Week considered the song to be a "pleasant, albeit predictable sampler" from their forthcoming studio album.

In a review of the 2017 deluxe edition of Believe You Me (1985), Paul Scott-Bates of Louder Than War said the song was "another typically Blancmange track with a chorus that really didn't kick in until the latter half of the track". The Electricity Club commented that the song was "serviceable synthpop, but perhaps lacks the dynamism that earlier Blancmange outings offered".

== Track listing ==
7" single

1. "What's Your Problem" – 4:12
2. "Side Two" – 3:39

2x 7" single (UK limited edition gatefold release)

1. "What's Your Problem" – 4:12
2. "Side Two" – 3:39
3. "Living on the Ceiling (12" Version)" – 5:35
4. "Feel Me (12" Version)" – 4:34

12" single

1. "What's Your Problem (Extended Version)" – 6:55
2. "Side Two" – 7:31
3. "Living on the Ceiling (12" Edit)" – 5:34

== Chart performance ==
Chart (1985)	Peak position
Irish Singles Chart	30
UK Singles Chart	40

== Personnel ==
Blancmange

- Neil Arthur – lead vocals, producer of "Side Two"
- Stephen Luscombe – keyboards, synthesizers

Additional personnel

- David Rhodes – guitar
- Stewart Levine – producer of "What's Your Problem"
- John Williams – producer of "Side Two"
- Mike Howlett – producer of "Living on the Ceiling" and "Feel Me"

Other

- Assorted Images – sleeve design
