= Don't Tell Me (Blancmange song) =

Single by Blancmange

from the album Mange Tout
- B-side: "Get Out of That"
- Released: 6 April 1984
- Genre: Synth-pop
- Length: 3:28
- Label: London; Sire (US)
- Songwriters: Neil Arthur; Stephen Luscombe
- Producer: Peter Collins

Blancmange singles chronology
"That's Love, That It Is" (1983)	"Don't Tell Me" (1984)	"The Day Before You Came" (1984)

Music video
- "Don't Tell Me" on YouTube

"Don't Tell Me" is a song by the English synth-pop duo Blancmange, released on 6 April 1984 as the third single from their second studio album Mange Tout (1984). Written by Neil Arthur and Stephen Luscombe, and produced by Peter Collins, "Don't Tell Me" reached No. 8 in the UK and remained in the charts for ten weeks. A music video was filmed in Valencia, Spain, to promote the single.

== Critical reception ==
Upon release, Debbi Voller of Number One stated: "Blancmange are back with a joyous and uplifting romp that could make them the flavour of the month. This song's so bouncy it sounds as if [it was] recorded on a highly sprung trampoline." Tom Hibbert of Smash Hits commented: "Neil Arthur sings of climbing mountains, touching skies and other unlikely physical feats to an energetic electro-pop backing that, if not thoroughly satisfying, contains a certain perky appeal." Billboard considered the song to have "an engaging melody with jagged and exotic studio effects".

In a retrospective review of Mange Tout (1984), Bill Cassel of AllMusic considered the song to be "nigh irresistible". Paul Scott-Bates of Louder Than War described the song as "poppy and catchy" with a "towering chorus". He added that it "maybe came the closest to repeating the Eastern sound of "Living on the Ceiling"."

== Track listings ==
7" single

1. "Don't Tell Me" – 3:28
2. "Get Out of That" – 4:22

12" single

1. "Don't Tell Me" – 6:28
2. "Get Out of That" – 4:22

12" single (US release)

1. "Don't Tell Me" (extended version) – 6:22
2. "Don't Tell Me" (edit) – 3:28
3. "Get Out of That" – 4:22

12" single (US promo)

1. "Don't Tell Me" (remix) – 6:45
2. "Don't Tell Me" (remix edit) – 3:09

== Chart performance ==
Chart (1984)	Peak position
Belgian Singles Chart	35
Canadian RPM Top 100	48
Dutch Singles Chart	26
German Singles Chart	34
Irish Singles Chart	10
Swiss Singles Chart	27
UK Singles Chart	8
US Billboard Hot Dance/Disco	44

=== Year-end charts ===
Year-end chart performance for " Don't Tell Me"
Chart (1984)	Position
UK Singles (Gallup)	96

== Personnel ==
Blancmange

- Neil Arthur – lead vocals
- Stephen Luscombe – keyboards, synthesizers

Additional musicians

- Deepak Khazanchi – sitar on "Don't Tell Me"
- Pandit Dinesh – tabla and madal on "Don't Tell Me"
- David Rhodes – guitar on "Get Out of That"
- Rick Phylip-Jones – double bass on "Get Out of That"
- Andy Richards – keyboards (uncredited) on "Don't Tell Me"
- J. J. Jeczalik – keyboards (uncredited) on "Don't Tell Me"

Production and artwork

- Peter Collins – producer of "Don't Tell Me"
- Julian Mendelsohn – engineer on "Don't Tell Me"
- John Luongo – producer of "Get Out of That"
- Harvey Goldberg, Mark Kamins – remixing on "Don't Tell Me (Remix)" and "Don't Tell Me (Remix Edit)"
- Simon Fowler – photography
