= That's Love, That It Is =

Single by Blancmange

from the album Mange Tout
- B-side: "Vishnu"
- Released: 18 November 1983
- Genre: Synth-pop; dance-pop
- Length: 4:18
- Label: London; Sire (US)
- Songwriters: Neil Arthur; Stephen Luscombe
- Producer: John Luongo

Blancmange singles chronology
"Blind Vision" (1983)	"That's Love, That It Is" (1983)	"Don't Tell Me" (1984)

Music video
- "That's Love, That It Is" on YouTube

"That's Love, That It Is" is a song by the English synth-pop duo Blancmange, released on 18 November 1983 as the second single from their second studio album Mange Tout (1984). It was written by Neil Arthur and Stephen Luscombe, and produced by John Luongo. "That's Love, That It Is" reached No. 33 in the UK and remained in the charts for eight weeks. In January 1985, the song, paired with "Game Above My Head", reached No. 16 on the US Billboard Hot Dance/Disco chart.

A music video was filmed to promote the single. It was directed by Tim Pope and achieved light rotation on MTV.

== Critical reception ==
Upon release, Jools Holland, reviewing for Number One, stated: "I like the song. The production, however, is a little bit 'standard contemporary'." Billboard commented: "Domestic issue of a single that saw some chart action as an import earlier this year; duo's electronic zest is good for a second listen."

In a retrospective review of Mange Tout (1984), Bill Cassel of AllMusic commented: "While the singles "Don't Tell Me" and "Blind Vision" are nigh irresistible, the similar "That's Love That It Is" gets to be a bit much." Paul Scott-Bates of Louder Than War commented: ""That's Love That It Is" remains one of their finest moments. It's often psychotic, over-the-top bombardment of sound and vocal really shouldn't have worked but it did, and with great success."

== Track listing ==
7" single

1. "That's Love, That It Is" – 4:18
2. "Vishnu" – 5:18

7" single (UK 2x vinyl, limited edition release)

1. "That's Love, That It Is" – 4:18
2. "Vishnu" – 5:18
3. "Blind Vision" – 3:58
4. "Heaven Knows Where" – 3:25

12" single

1. "That's Love, That It Is" – 6:34
2. "Vishnu" – 5:16

12" single (UK #2 release)

1. "That's Love, That It Is (Re-Mix)" – 6:56
2. "Vishnu" – 4:51

12" single (UK 2× vinyl, limited edition release)

1. "That's Love, That It Is (Remix)" – 6:56
2. "Vishnu" – 4:51
3. "Blind Vision" – 9:39
4. "Heaven Knows Where" – 3:25
5. "On Our Way To?" – 5:36

12" single (US release)

1. "That's Love, That It Is (Extended Remix Version)" – 7:30
2. "Game Above My Head (Extended Remix Version)" – 7:06
3. "Don't Tell Me (Dance Remix)" – 6:45

12" single (US promo)

1. "That's Love, That It Is (Extended Remix)" – 7:30
2. "That's Love That It Is (7" Version/Edit)" – 4:18
3. "That's Love That It Is (Instrumental)" – 8:09

== Personnel ==
Blancmange

- Neil Arthur – lead vocals, producer of "Game Above My Head", "Heaven Knows Where" and "On Our Way To?"
- Stephen Luscombe – keyboards, synthesizers, producer of "Game Above My Head"

Additional personnel

- Brenda White, Tawatha Agee, Vernice – backing vocals on "That's Love, That It Is"
- David Rhodes – guitar on "That's Love, That It Is"
- Jim Clouse, Vinnie Della-Rocca – saxophone on "That's Love, That It Is"
- Jack Gale, Keith O'Quinn – trombone on "That's Love, That It Is"
- Joe Mosello – trumpet on "That's Love, That It Is"
- Bashiri Johnson, Gerry Marotta – percussion on "That's Love, That It Is"
- James Biondolillo – maestro on "That's Love, That It Is"

Production and artwork

- John Luongo – producer of "That's Love, That It Is", "Vishnu" and "Blind Vision"
- John Owen Williams – producer of "Game Above My Head"
- Peter Collins – producer of "Don't Tell Me"
- Mark Kamins – remixing on "Don't Tell Me (Dance Remix)"
- Joseph Watt – editing on "That's Love, That It Is (Extended Remix Version)" and "Game Above My Head (Extended Remix Version)"
- Jay Mark – engineer on "That's Love, That It Is"
- Matthew Wallace, Elisa Gura, Glenn Rosenstein, Jimmy Santis, Linda Randazzo, Femi Jiya, James Doherty, John Potaka, Michael Hutchinson – assistant engineers on "That's Love, That It Is"
- John Fryer – engineer on "Heaven Knows Where Heaven Is" and "On Our Way To?"
- Sukita – photography

== Chart performance ==
Chart (1983)	Peak position
UK Singles Chart	33

Chart (1984–85)	Peak position
US Billboard Hot Dance/Disco	16
