= Blind Vision =

Single by Blancmange

from the album Mange Tout
- B-side: "Heaven Knows Where Heaven Is"
- Released: 29 April 1983
- Genre: Synth-pop; dance-pop; electropop; new wave
- Length: 3:58
- Label: London; Island (US)
- Songwriters: Neil Arthur; Stephen Luscombe
- Producer: John Luongo

Blancmange singles chronology
"Waves" (1983)	"Blind Vision" (1983)	"That's Love, That It Is" (1983)

Music video
- "Blind Vision" on YouTube

"Blind Vision" is a song by the English synth-pop band Blancmange, released on 29 April 1983 as the lead single from their second studio album Mange Tout (1984). Written by Neil Arthur and Stephen Luscombe, and produced by John Luongo, "Blind Vision" reached No. 10 in the UK and remained in the charts for eight weeks. A music video was filmed to promote the single, which received light rotation on MTV.

== Background ==
In a 1982 interview with Record Mirror, Arthur said of the song, "It's about people who are too blinkered to see what's staring them in the face, too stubborn to accept the truth. It's also about blind faith, accepting religion at face value."

== Critical reception ==
Upon release, Paul Simper of Number One stated: ""Living on the Ceiling" kept me firmly rooted to the ground. This is quite a bit better with John Luongo giving the song a tighter, brassier sound." John Shearlaw of Record Mirror commented: "Moody and more shouted than sung. A boinging bass and the odd brass trip keep the pressure on and that's just as well."

In a retrospective review of Mange Tout (1984), Bill Cassel of AllMusic considered the song to be "nigh irresistible". Paul Scott-Bates of Louder Than War commented: ""Blind Vision" gave us the almost iconic bass driven Blancmange sound. The funky guitar and remarkable percussion helped give the track a frenetic feel with a synth riff perfectly pairing up to the powerful sound of The Uptown Horns." The Electricity Club noted the song "introduced a brass element to Blancmange's palette of sounds, alongside a more muscular percussion".

== Track listing ==
7-inch single

1. "Blind Vision" – 3:58
2. "Heaven Knows Where Heaven Is" – 3:22

7-inch single (US release)

1. "Blind Vision" – 3:49
2. "Waves" – 4:10

7-inch single (US promo)

1. "Blind Vision" – 3:58
2. "Blind Vision" – 3:58

12-inch single

1. "Blind Vision" – 9:39
2. "Heaven Knows Where Heaven Is" – 3:25
3. "On Our Way To?" – 5:36

12-inch single (US release)

1. "Blind Vision (Long Version)" – 9:35
2. "Blind Vision (Edit)" – 3:49
3. "Waves" – 4:10

12-inch single (US promo)

1. "Blind Vision (Long Version)" – 9:35
2. "Blind Vision (Dub Version)" – 6:44
3. "Blind Vision (Edit)" – 3:49

== Personnel ==
Blancmange

- Neil Arthur – lead vocals, producer of "Heaven Knows Where Heaven Is" and "On Our Way To?"
- Stephen Luscombe – keyboards, synthesizers

Additional personnel

- Dolette McDonald, Brenda Jay Nelson, Jocelyn Brown – backing vocals on "Blind Vision"
- David Rhodes – guitar on "Blind Vision"
- James Bion Dolillo – maestro on "Blind Vision"
- Crispin Cioe, Arno Hecht – saxophone on "Blind Vision"
- Robert Funk – trumpet on "Blind Vision"
- Paul Litteral – trombone on "Blind Vision"
- Bashiri Johnson – percussion on "Blind Vision"
- Neil Jason – extra bass on "Blind Vision"

Production and artwork

- John Luongo – producer of "Blind Vision"
- Jay Mark – engineer on "Blind Vision"
- Linda Randazzo – assistant engineer on "Blind Vision"
- John Fryer – engineer on "Heaven Knows Where Heaven Is" and "On Our Way To?"
- Mike Howlett – producer of "Waves"
- Ashworth – photography

== Charts ==
Chart (1983)	Peak position
German Singles Chart	44
Irish Singles Chart	11
UK Singles Chart	10
US Billboard Hot Dance/Disco	3
