= Feel Me (Blancmange song) =

Single by Blancmange

from the album Happy Families
- B-side: "Feel Me (Instrumental)"
- Released: 16 July 1982
- Genre: Electro-funk; funk-pop; dance-pop
- Length: 5:05
- Label: London
- Songwriters: Neil Arthur; Stephen Luscombe
- Producer: Mike Howlett

Blancmange singles chronology
"God's Kitchen" (1982)	"Feel Me" (1982)	"Living on the Ceiling" (1982)

"Feel Me" is a song by the English synth-pop duo Blancmange, released on 16 July 1982 as the second single from their debut studio album Happy Families (1982). It was written by Neil Arthur and Stephen Luscombe, and produced by Mike Howlett. "Feel Me" reached No. 46 in the UK and remained on the charts for five weeks.

Speaking to The Spill Magazine in 2018, Arthur recalled of the song's writing: "Stephen came in with a groove — my input was the words and the topline melody."

== Critical reception ==
Upon its release, Dave Lewis of Sounds picked "Feel Me" as the "single of the week", calling it "exhilerating and exciting stuff". He summarised, "This is what good dance records are supposed to sound like, with talk/scream vocals David Byrne-style and great stabbing slabs of synth jutting in and out of the insistent percussive mantra that rattles away throughout." Vivien Goldman of the NME noted, "British white funksters Blancmange actually have the temerity to sing, in a very hammy neo-Ian Curtis strain, 'Feel the pain – take the blame – feel the same'. Leave it out, sailor! Of course, there's always the possibility that it's some kind of piss-take. Shame, because the rhythm track is quite good." In the US, Billboard picked the single as a "recommended" single under the "Dance/Disco" category. Keyboard wrote: "Much of Luscombe's work is sustained lines with muted tone colors, but on "Feel Me" he does a gutty synth bass figure."

In a retrospective review of Happy Families (1982), Bill Cassel of AllMusic considered "Feel Me" as one of the album's highlights. Ira Robbins of Trouser Press felt the song "suffer[s] from extreme monochromatic tediousness". John Bergstrom of PopMatters stated: "The nervous "I Can't Explain", and twisted electro-funk love song "Feel Me" still sound taut and sharp, and Arthur and Luscombe never bettered them." John Doran of The Quietus commented in a review of The Very Best of Blancmange (2012): "There is a marginally darker feel to other early singles with lurching, belligerent electronic funk pop evident on "Feel Me" and "I Can't Explain"."

== Track listing ==
7-inch single

1. "Feel Me" – 5:05
2. "Feel Me" (Instrumental) – 5:04

7-inch single (Philippines release)

1. "Feel Me" – 5:03
2. "God's Kitchen" – 2:51

12-inch single

1. "Feel Me (Extended Version)" – 7:03
2. "Feel Me (Instrumental)" – 5:08

== Personnel ==
Blancmange

- Neil Arthur – lead vocals
- Stephen Luscombe – keyboards, synthesizers

Additional personnel

- Madeline Bell, Stevie Lange – backing vocals
- David Rhodes – guitar
- Mike Howlett – producer
- Tim Young – mastering

== Charts ==
Chart (1982)	Peak position
UK singles chart	46
