= The Day Before You Came =

1982 song by ABBA

Single by ABBA

from the album The Singles: The First Ten Years
- B-side: "Cassandra"
- Released: 18 October 1982
- Recorded: 20 August 1982
- Studio: Polar Music Studios
- Genre: Synth-pop; art pop
- Length: 5:50
- Label: Polar
- Songwriters: Benny Andersson; Björn Ulvaeus
- Producers: Benny Andersson; Björn Ulvaeus

ABBA singles chronology
"The Visitors" (1982)	"The Day Before You Came" (1982)	"Under Attack" (1982)

Music video
- "The Day Before You Came" on YouTube

"The Day Before You Came" is a song recorded by Swedish pop group ABBA, released on 10 October 1982 as the lead single from their compilation album The Singles: The First Ten Years (1982) and their penultimate single (preceding "Under Attack") before the group ended. Described as a dark, sorrowful swan song, it features Agnetha Fältskog alone on lead vocals. Its sound was inspired by the sequencer-driven synths popular at the time by contemporary musicians and is heavy on the synth soundscape with a darkly ethereal output. While the song received mixed "lukewarm" reviews upon release, it has retrospectively garnered a high amount of praise and considered by some to be one of ABBA's finest songs. The song also appears on the greatest hits compilation More ABBA Gold: More ABBA Hits (1993).

== History ==
=== Development ===
Following the November 1981 release of ABBA's eighth album The Visitors, the four ABBA members took some time away from the group to focus on individual priorities. Björn Ulvaeus and Benny Andersson both became fathers again in January 1982, and wanted to spend some time with their wives and new born children; at the same time, they were beginning to develop ideas for their first musical, Chess, alongside Tim Rice. Meanwhile, Anni-Frid (Frida) Lyngstad recorded her first solo album in seven years, working with Phil Collins to produce Something's Going On, and Agnetha Fältskog took a break from music to spend time with her children.

Björn and Benny returned to work on a planned follow up album to The Visitors in April 1982, working together in songwriting sessions and coming up with three new songs, "You Owe Me One", "I Am the City" and "Just Like That". This was followed by recording sessions at Polar Studios in May 1982 with Agnetha and Frida to record the new songs. The sessions were tense, and the results disappointing. Of the three songs recorded, "You Owe Me One" was deemed fit to be a B-side at best; as for "I Am the City" and "Just Like That", the band felt the former "wasn't one of their better songs" and decided the verse and chorus of the latter did not fit together. All three songs were filed away for possible use at a later date. In the end, "I Am the City" would not see international release until its appearance on More ABBA Gold, and ABBA's recording of "Just Like That" has never been released in its entirety, though an excerpt was released in 1994. Concluding that a new full length album was not a realistic prospect for 1982, Polar Music decided instead to release a double-album compilation of ABBA’s most successful singles in autumn 1982, in which would be included some new recordings which could also be released as singles.

=== Composition ===
Having taken a break, on 2–4 August 1982 ABBA returned to the recording studio with two new songs written, "Cassandra" and "Under Attack". Both songs were recorded to Björn and Benny's satisfaction in these sessions, though they were sceptical that either would work as a single A-side. With the studio booked for the rest of the day, and nothing else ready for recording, they decided to work on some song ideas there and then. One idea Benny had was "a single melodic fragment that lent itself to being repeated in a series of ascending and descending phrases over several key changes". Working with Björn, he used this as the basis for an entire song. Within an hour they had written the whole melody, and had given the new song the working title ‘Den lidande fågeln’ (‘The Suffering Bird’). This song would be released under the title "The Day Before You Came".

I really like that song. It becomes extremely sad when you hear it like this. The recording is sad too, but the lyric itself is not sad, which is the genius of Björn (Ulvaeus). To me, when you read that lyric and take the music away it’s just someone saying what they did that day—'I read a book', 'I watched TV', 'I took the tube', whatever; it doesn’t say what it really is. But when you put that lyric onto that music you realise something not good has happened. It’s a very intelligent lyric.

— Benny Andersson, Interview with News.com

Björn wrote the lyrics at and following the 2–4 August sessions. His first task was to decide on a theme, and here he was inspired by the characteristics of the melody he and Benny had written: "The tune is narrative in itself, and relentless. That almost monotonous quality made me think of this girl who was living in a sort of gloominess and is now back in that same sense of gloom." His idea for a theme therefore was "a woman recounting all the dull, ordinary things she “guessed she must have done” the day before she had a highly charged encounter with a man" and began a relationship that would end unhappily: "He has left her, and her life has returned to how it ‘must have been’ before she met him.”

Once he had his theme, he started writing the lyrics. "When I started writing the lyrics I already knew that the melody was such that from a technical point of view they had to be constructed so that they would lead up to the 'day before you came' place in the melody," he said. "I wrote down all the everyday incidents and things I could think of, that would happen to someone leading a routine kind of life. It was very difficult from a grammatical point of view to get it all to fit together, because it would all have to be logical, there were no place for hitches."

=== Recording ===
This excerpt of "The Day Before You Came" (which includes the end of verse two and the start of the second refrain) illustrates Agnetha's lead vocals of the verse, Frida's operatic backing vocals of the refrain, and the synth landscape, all of which create an ominous and ethereal atmosphere.

With the melody and lyrics written, the group reconvened at Polar Studios on 20 August to lay down a track. As in all the 1982 recording sessions, the production was minimalist, Benny and Björn aiming to "keep...the arrangements as simple as possible and to create them electronically". As with the majority of other tracks produced around this time, there was no use of grand piano, and only limited hints of bass, electric, or acoustic guitars. Most of the instruments were played by Benny, synthetically produced on his GX-1 synthesiser and using a Linn drum machine for rhythmic accompaniment. He built up the music from a click track template, something which he later said "was probably not a good idea", despite his liking the track. Real drums were initially rejected in favour of a "synth-generated beat"; later in the session, Benny and Björn changed their minds, and percussionist Åke Sundqvist was called in to lay down a snare drum overdub for the track. The only other instrumentalist was Björn himself, who provided "a few licks of acoustic guitar".

The song has the same production style as "I Am The City", a song recorded earlier that year. Throughout the song, Benny litters the soundscape with a "surprising...mixed bag of synth sounds" which add texture to the piece. The production was influenced by the "sequencer-driven, shrill blipping sound" popular on the records of contemporary musicians such as Gary Numan, The Human League, Soft Cell and Depeche Mode. ABBA had never used a sequencer on their records before, but for this track their sound engineer Michael Tretow simulated the characteristic sequencer effect by 'gating' Benny's synthesizer-playing, the beat of the percussion determining at what moments in the song the sound of Benny's normal long-chord synthesizer playing would be heard or not. While the song has "long, sustained block chords" – a "given" for ABBA songs – it also has "a liberal smattering of percussive synth effects". An example is the "carefree", "spontaneous", and "conversational" synthetic twin flutes, which begin their "integral role in the soundscape [by] offering regular bouts of whimsical reassurance" at the very start of the track. These 'flutes' are "arguably [the song's] signature sound". Their riff "smooths out a series of sustained chordal layers" in the refrains, aided by the backing vocals.

Agnetha sang the lead vocal. The song is noteworthy as "Frida does not double or harmonise with Agnetha's vocal line", and instead only provides backing vocals. In an "intriguing new approach" that had rarely been done in previous ABBA recordings, where she usually sang the lower melody and harmony lines, Frida used a "vibrato-laden...operatic technique" when singing "the sustained high range melody line [of the] refrains". At the point in each refrain where the vocal line drops an octave "to a more manageable register", she "relaxes her vowel sound to a free-flowing and tender falsetto". A "series of subtle vocal and production re-enforcements" give verse three both a sense of empathy and heightened tension. It is at this point in the song that Frida provides a "delicate and brittle" backing vocal to Agnetha's lead. Björn joins in later in the verse, at "I must've gone to bed...", to add to this "smooth and genial major-key affirmation". Benny's riffs "level...out into a more synthetic plateau" at "And rattling on the roof...", Agnetha's second-last phrase. One more repeat of the "forlorn title hook", and the lead vocals end, the soundscape being swept up by the instruments and backing vocals in a "moving mosaic of sound colours" until the end of the song.

Björn commented that "you can tell in that song that we were straining towards musical theatre as we [he and Benny] got Agnetha to act the part of the person in that song". This creative choice meant Agnetha sang like an "ordinary woman" rather than a lead vocalist. Agnetha, Benny and Björn would all subsequently wonder if "the dramatic scope [would] have been far greater had Agnetha's natural instincts been allowed to take hold". Swedish novelist Jerker Virdborg noted in a newspaper piece 20 years later that the vocal is "sung by a dimmed and turned off...Agnetha Fältskog".

Many years after the song was recorded, Michael Tretow recalled Agnetha performing the lead with dimmed lights and said that the mood had become sad and everybody in the studio knew that 'this was the end'. On this rumour, Stephen Emms of The Guardian continues the story by saying "finishing her vocals, our heroine was to remove her headphones and walk solemnly out into the daylight, never to return".

=== Music video ===
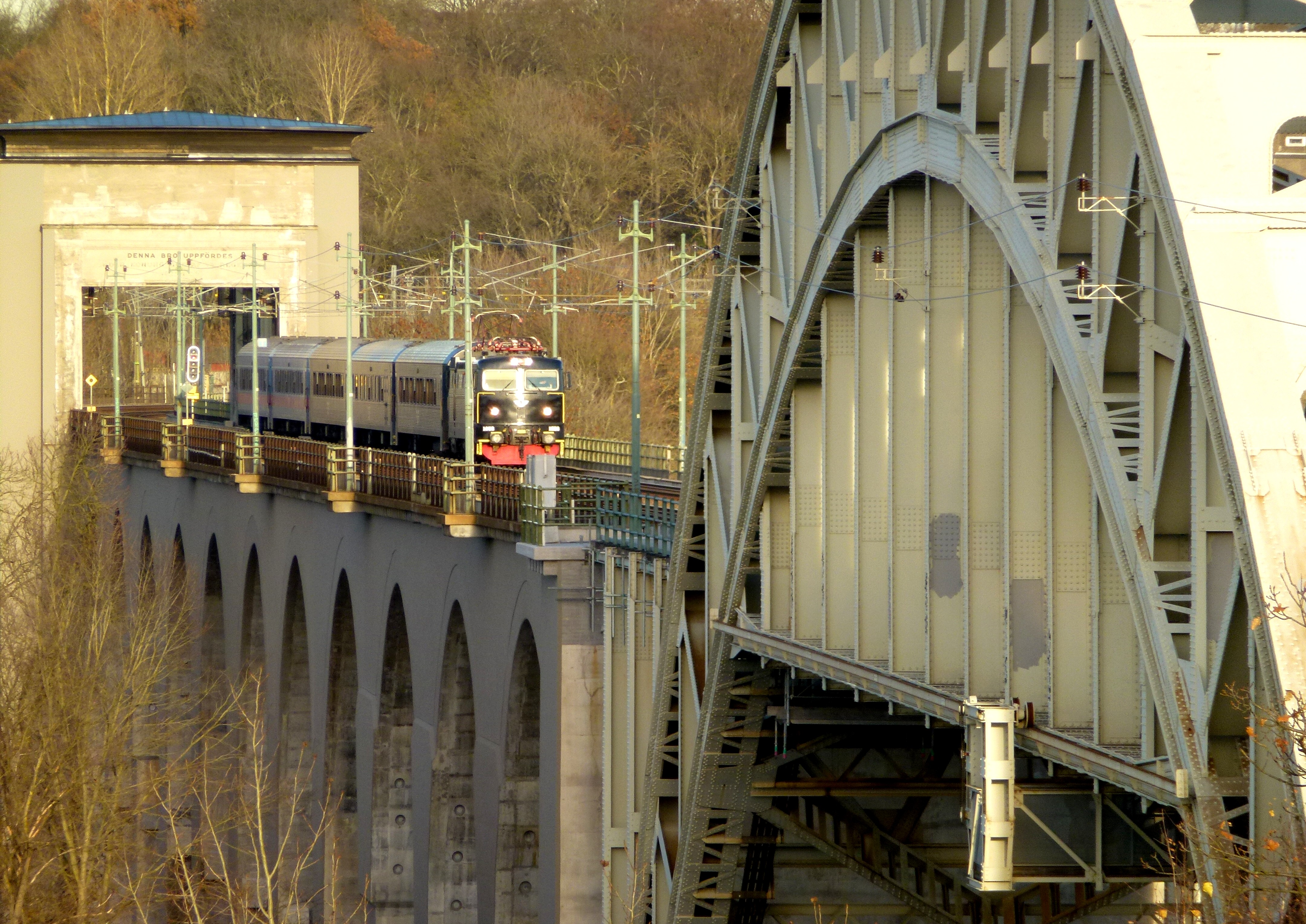
Train crossing the Eastern Årsta Bridge.

The song was promoted by a music video clip filmed on 21 September 1982, and produced by the team of director Kjell Sundvall and cinematographer Kjell-Åke Andersson, breaking ABBA's eight-year directing relationship with Lasse Hallström. The change in direction had been prompted by Polar Music and its affiliates, who believed Hallström's "sometimes unglamorous, almost documentary-style aesthetics" were out of step with the "spectacular, American-type, glossy video" becoming increasingly popular via MTV, and had decided a fresh focus was necessary. Sundvall and Andersson, regarded as an up-and-coming filmmaker team, were recruited by Björn to replace Hallström on the advice of his wife Lena Källersjö, who had worked with them on another project.

The video featured scenes filmed on location in and around Stockholm, showing Agnetha flirting with and developing a romantic relationship with a stranger on a train, played by Swedish actor Jonas Bergström, best known for his role in Jerry Lewis's unfinished and unreleased 1972 movie The Day the Clown Cried. The video included shots of the Årstabron bridge, located in the southern part of Stockholm. These shots were difficult for Sundvall and Andersson to capture, and almost resulted in tragedy: "There is a kind of cool helicopter shot when the train passes over the Årstabron bridge, but when we filmed it I almost fell out," Andersson later claimed. Within the context of the music video, the train on the bridge actually goes in the wrong direction. In the clip, Agnetha waits at Tumba station for the train and ends up in the city. However, in reality the train seen on the bridge goes from the city to Tumba.

The parts of the video featuring all the members of ABBA were filmed at the China Theatre in Berzelii Park, Stockholm, near the Polar Music offices. There were several photo sessions done during filming at the theatre. One of them, known as "the green session", was taken in the theatre's foyer. Overall, the video shoot went well - Kjell-Åke Andersson reported Agnetha was "incredibly easy to work with" - but Sundvall would later recall a strange atmosphere: “It didn’t really feel like we had been working with a group, but with four individuals.”

Christopher Patrick, in ABBA: Let the Music Speak, says the final sequence in the music video, in which "the train [where the narrator meets her lover] shunts off into oblivion, leaving in its wake a bleak and deserted railway station", is a fitting metaphor for ABBA, having reached the end of their creative partnership.

=== Release and chart performance ===
"The Day Before You Came" was released as a single on 18 October 1982, with "Cassandra", as the B-side. By this time, ABBA were experiencing a slow decline in single sales. Although the single hit the top 5 in Belgium, Finland, West Germany, the Netherlands, Norway, Poland, Sweden and Switzerland, and reached number five on the Adult Contemporary chart in Canada, it peaked at number 32 in the UK singles chart, making it one of their least successful singles ever and breaking "a string of 19 consecutive top 30 hits" which started in 1975 with "S.O.S."

Reflecting on the song's failure, Björn would later suggest, "If we at least had let Agnetha sing it more beautifully I believe people would have found it easier to take the song to their hearts." But the primary cause, he suggested was that the group was "simply starting to get out of touch with the pop music mainstream … You can only manage to be a part of that mainstream – that remarkable, mysterious force that is so hard to define – for a limited number of years." Instead, he believed, they were "heading into something more mature, more mysterious and more exciting", but that at that time it was "one step too far for [their] audience". He said that although Tim Rice really liked the song, he had warned them that it was "beyond what [the ABBA] fans expected". However, the Sydney Morning Herald article "Happily ABBA after" suggests this may be because ABBA only "promoted it in Britain with a couple of glum TV appearances". Benny said that in his opinion, "'The Day Before You Came' is the best lyric that Björn has written: it's a really good song, but not a good recording". He compared this to "Under Attack", recorded around the same time, which he described as "a wonderful recording, but not such a good song".

Christopher Patrick, in his work ABBA: Let The Music Speak, describes the song as "more unusual and atmospheric" than "Under Attack". He says that these two ABBA singles, the last before the group unofficially split up, "are crystal balls that provide a glimpse as to the intriguing future direction in which Benny and Björn were starting to take the group sound". Acoustic instruments had been slowly replaced by a more synth-sound ever since Super Trouper, and by this time, ABBA's final output would have "s[a]t very comfortably on either of the two albums Benny and Björn … produced for Swedish duo Gemini in the mid-'80s", as they are also "quite minimalist in arrangements and orchestration", and synth-orientated. He says that Agnetha's "lament", whether the boys' "stylistic directive" is taken into account, is made "heart-rendering". He argues this is the case as beyond ABBA she, like the narrator in the song, lived an "ordinary … life", far removed from celebrity and fame. He also argues that although ABBA's final moments had come by the time this song was released, "no-one was empowered to concede it", but also said that the "lukewarm" response toward the song by the public "had already made the decision for [the band over whether to stay together or split up]".

=== Reissues and compilations ===
On reissues of The Visitors on CD, "The Day Before You Came" has been added as track 11 (the second bonus track after "Should I Laugh Or Cry"). The song is also featured as track 3 on the 1993 compilation More ABBA Gold – More ABBA Hits, track 14 of disc 3 in the 1994 compilation Thank You for the Music, track 11 of disc 2 in the 1999 compilation The Complete Singles Collection, track 13 of disc 2 in the 2001 compilation The Definite Collection (also featured on the DVD release), and the fourth bonus track on The Visitors album in the 2005 compilation The Complete Studio Recordings (on which the music video is also featured). The song is also featured on The Visitors [Deluxe Edition].

The sheet music of the song has been released.

== Analysis ==
=== Interpretation ===
The lyrics chronicle an ordinary half-remembered day in the life of the protagonist, "before it is changed forever: By what, we never learn." The identity of the titular "You" was long regarded as a "pop mystery" like the "identity of the subject of Carly Simon's 'You're So Vain'". After being asked by The Times about this on 26 March 2010, Björn Ulvaeus "smiled enigmatically" and said: "You've spotted it, haven't you? The music is hinting at it". Subsequently, in 2012 Björn elaborated, "The tune is narrative in itself, and relentless. That almost monotonous quality made me think of this girl who was living in a sort of gloominess and is now back in that same sense of gloom. He has left her, and her life has returned to how it 'must have been' before she met him".

Others have described it as "the ordinary life of a woman the day before the arrival of her lover"; about "the wonder of falling in love by flatly documenting how banal life was before love struck"; as an illustration of a common ABBA theme, in which "the unremarkable woman [is] given purpose by a remarkable man...most often...through romance"; and as the "account of one ordinary woman's mundane and predictable daily existence", made sobering as it becomes evident that she does not have the lover she yearns for.

Prior to Björn's 2012 comments, some interpretations of the song presumed a more sinister narrative. The song's narrative has been described as epitomising a central ABBA theme, which is that "life is trivial and nothing happens, but the somethings that might happen are worse." The song, argued one article, conveys a sense that "there is something wrong", in that "instead of being a happy song about complete solitude", the song is driven forward "by an overwhelming sadness". It draws the conclusion that "when [the narrator] met the man [her life] became even worse", for unspecified reasons that might include "fear, confinement, [or] beatings". Some writers have even suggested the song's "spectral choirs", the "keening backing vocals of...dread" suggest the "You" referred to by the narrator could be "a murderer as much as a lover".

=== Lyrics ===
Stephen Emms for The Guardian argues that the "ordinariness [and] universality [of the] first-person account" of a depressing day is what draws the audience in, and "morphs [the song] into an unusually poignant parable of what modern life means". He points out that beyond the supposed simplicity, the lyrics are "oddly imprecise...in a vague recollective tone", and adds that the fact sentences include phrases such as "I must have...", "I'm pretty sure...", or "...or something in that style" implies that Agnetha is an "unreliable narrator" and give the entire song a veil of ambiguity. He says that sentences such as "at the time I never noticed I was blue" gives "her account a tinge of unreality, even fiction". Sometimes she may state something about her day (such as "I'm sure my life was well within its usual frame"), and we as the audience fear that in reality the opposite may be true.

Tom Ewing of Pitchfork refers to the lyrics as "awkward" and "conversational". He says that as non-native speakers, they rarely used metaphors or poetic imagery, and instead relied on a "matter-of-fact reportage of feeling", resulting in a "slight stiltedness" which, he argues "is what makes ABBA great lyricists". He says that this style of lyric writing, coupled with the female leads' "occasional...halting pronunciation... could make them sound devastatingly direct and vulnerable", as shown in The Day Before You Came.

Tony Hawks, in his work One Hit Wonderland, cites "The Day Before You Came" when commenting that despite the ABBA lyricists' genius, "there were occasions when [Benny and Björn] clearly had difficulty coming up with lines which provided the requisite number of syllables to complete a line", thereby causing the girls to sing things that no native English speaker would ever actually say. His "favourite line" due to its bizarreness is "there's not I think a single episode of Dallas that I didn't see", and responds with the equally bizarre sentence "...there's not I think a single example of better lyrics that I didn't see". He refers to these "nonsense lyric[s]" as gems, and argues "what does it matter when as long as it's got a catchy tune". He adds, via a dialogue with a character named Willie, that "[Euro-dance artists] just sing about whatever they want and don't worry in the slightest if it makes any sense or not".

Priya Elan of NME says "a deeper probe [into the lyrics] suggests something a bit darker at the core" than just a woman reflecting on her life before meeting her lover. He comments that the song's working title, The Suffering Bird, may be "hinting at a prison-like fragility". He also comments on the "disorientating ambiguity" of the lyrics, reminiscent of a "zombie sleepwalking through their life", and also notes the line "I need a lot of sleep", which suggests the narrator is suffering from depression.

Margaret-Mary Lieb, as part of the 13th Annual KOTESOL International Conference, suggested that a variety of "grammar lessons...can be based on popular songs", and states that "The Day Before You Came" "offers reinforcement of past modals".

=== Cultural references ===
There are some pop-culture references in the song, which are open to interpretation. For example, the narrator refers to never missing an episode of the TV show Dallas, very popular at that time due to the 1980 murder-themed storyline Who shot J.R.?. She also recalls reading something by Marilyn French, or within the same genre. French (1929–2009) was an American author, a radical feminist whose "primary subject was the subjugation of women". The "latest [novel] by Marilyn French", by the time the song was written, was the 1980 work The Bleeding Heart, which involves a couple who meet on the train, and "fall instantly in love, only to discover they agree on nothing...from the start [knowing] they have only one year together". This plot has been cited as having similarities to the song's narrative.

=== Repetitiveness and simplicity ===
The song follows in the footsteps of "The Winner Takes it All" as another ABBA song that had no "clearly defined verse/chorus structure". The song is deceptively complicated, perhaps due to its length, and is actually one of their simplest tunes melodically. Underneath the "rich tapestry" of the three-verse song is a "close-knit series of three-note building blocks", the last block in each statement being repeated at the start of the following one. For example, "I must have left my house/at eight because I always do" has the musical pattern 1-7-6/2-1-7 while the following phrase, "My train, I'm certain left/the station just when it was due" has a musical pattern of 2-1-7/3-2-1. These "descending three-note patterns" go up a note each time a new statement is sung. For example, as the verse is sung, the pattern could go from do-ti-la to re-do-ti to mi-re-do etc., with each new phrase. Starting with a "minor anchor power-of-three" (mi-re-do), this pattern "remains intact" during the entire song, with the tune "weaving its soulful way through the hues of its relative keys C minor and E flat major, and their collaborators". After the first two statements, the minor key swaps to the relative major, where it remains until the final few statements, just in time for the title hook. The only time the descending pattern is broken is in the eighth statement of each verse ("The usual place, the usual bunch" in the first verse – 6-5-4/5-6-5 went to 4-3-2).

In his work Thank You for the Music, Robert Davidson discusses the notion of "young pop stars" commenting on the "musical sophistication" of ABBA songs (which, he argues, would in turn have seemed simple to earlier artists), and the general trend of simpler music in recent times. He says that ABBA itself took part in this trend with its final output, and cites "The Day Before You Came" as one "in which texture takes primacy [over the] tunes".

== Reception ==
=== Critical reception ===
Contemporary reviews were initially mixed on the track. Mike Gardner, reviewing for Record Mirror, negatively described the single as a "morbid slice of crocodile tears" that "is tedium incarnate." Record Business, while reviewing the following single "Under Attack", called "The Day Before You Came" "disappointing" and much less stronger than the former track.

Retrospectively, the single has gone on to receive acclaim by music critics. In 2010, "The Day Before You Came" was positively reviewed by Stephen Emms for The Guardian. Emms opined that the song is a "forgotten masterpiece", and that the mixture of "the genuine sense of loss in Agnetha's voice, Frida's operatics, a moodily expressionist video and plaintive synths as omnipresent as the rain 'rattling' on the roof . . . carries a sense of foreboding almost unparalleled in pop music." Emms continued to state that "the track's power lies in its layering of boredom and grandeur, transience and doom. It combines a rising sense of melancholy, both in its melody and production, with wistful, nostalgic lyrics." Emms also interpreted that the pathos is "heightened by an extended funereal instrumental coda which acts as one big question mark, leaving us with the feeling that this is not just a meditation on the quotidian but something greater, existential even. Is this imagined relationship, like the band itself, doomed?" He argues in his review that, in his opinion, it is unlikely that the "complexity [in "The Day Before You Came" could be replicated in] ABBA's [then] rumoured comeback single"

In an interview done for the book Abba – Uncensored on the Record, music journalist Hugh Fielder says that the song is "built on banks of electronic instruments that provide a strong atmosphere for Frida's vocals". He comments that her vocals have been mixed into the background of the song, creating a "cold, objective" atmosphere, "almost as if she's looking down on the rest of us". He says the song has a "theatrical element", and puts this down to the fact that by this time Benny and Björn had started thinking beyond 5-minute pop songs and begun writing in terms of stage productions, the next frontier beyond ABBA.

Kultur says the song "is portrayed, sophisticated enough, simply by harmonies and minor cadences, topped off with Anni-Frid Lyngstad's obbligato that could just as easily belong in a baroque largo by Handel and Albinoni".

Virdborg describes it as ABBA's "darkest song" and their "very last--and best--recording". It noted that the "happy and well-behaved Abba in [its] last creative moment managed to portray how the romantic dream--which so incredibly strongly permeates our entire culture, especially through advertising--might as well mean destructiveness and suffocating nightmare, that was the last thing many expected [ABBA to do] a few years earlier".

The song has been described as: "mesmerising [and] hypnotic", "[a] stark, superb swansong", and "[the] strangest and maybe best of all [from ABBA's catalogue]". Evening Standard music critic John Aizlewood referred to the "detailed résumé of the ordinariness of someone's life" as "desperately unhappy".

In a critique of the 2012 album The Visitors [Deluxe Edition], in which "The Day Before You Came" is a bonus track, Tom Ewing of Pitchfork describes the song as the "career highlight" for ABBA. He says that the song "shares its themes with much of the album", despite being "on paper, a happier song" than the title track. He suggests that the song holds the view that "life is unstable, happiness may be fleeting, and your world can be instantly and forever overturned", and comments that these "strong, resonant ideas" are the perfect way for the band to have ended their career, and serves as an almost "spectral, uneasy premonition . . . of [ABBA's] own demise".

In his work ABBA: Let The Music Speak, Christopher Patrick refers to "The Day Before You Came" as "ABBA's swansong" and an "electronic masterpiece". He describes it as "one of the saddest ABBA songs of all" and "like a magnificent piece of embroidery". He states that "the melancholy is so deeply engrained in [the song's] fabric", and says the "meticulous attention to detail in the vocals and production" is "intricately beautiful". He comments that the approach, involving giving Agnetha lead vocal and make Frida essentially a backup singer, "serves the song very well", adding that "Agnetha's solitary vocal accentuates th[e] sense of loneliness and isolation". He says that "the resulting performance" is both emotional and effective, and "is perfectly matched to the production". He says that into the "dying fade", there is a "faint haze of farewell"

=== As poetry ===
In her paper The Return of Melodrama, Maaike Meijer explains that critic Guus Middag analysed "The Day Before You Came" within the context of examining how "unsophisticated texts [such as popular songs] were able to evoke [immediate emotion] in the reader". He appreciated how the song "creates an open space for the listener by effectively remaining silent about what had changed the grey life of the speaker", and cited a similar effect in Wisława Szymborska’s poem 16 May 1973. Although Middag claims the poem achieved it much better, Meijer says there still is some worth in comparing the song and the poem. She also comments on novelist Marcel Möring's reading of "The Day Before You Came" "as a serious poem", thereby "demonstrat[ing] how a song could be transformed into a complex, multi-layered and interesting text, thanks to an interpretative approach, which looks for these aspects". Möring saw the song as "small labyrinths of language, refined aquarelle paintings, complex clockworks of Swiss precision", which Meijer says is an analysis fitting of a "poem deserving careful reading". She adds that "Möring’s sophisticated modernist poetics transports the song to the realm of hermetic poetry". Möring also "compared the Abba song to the classics by Strauss, Mahler and Ives", and in response critic Pieter Steinz, while "declar[ing] the song to be a good one", also "questioned the necessity of Möring's complex academic hermeneutics".

=== Post-ABBA polls and competitions ===
In a "The Greatest Pop Songs in History" countdown conducted by NME, the song came in at #6. Priya Elan commented that the song was "arguably [ABBA's] finest". He says the song is "interesting" as it "totally breaks with the popular impression of the band as all showbiz smiles, massive harmonies, gaudy outfits...". In a career largely based in trying to stuff as much into one song as possible – a "more is better" philosophy – Elan noted that it is unusual for the "track [to] scuttle...along like a slow heartbreak, sparsely painting its picture with the sole palette of a synth and Agnetha’s lone vocal". However he also implied that the song is deceptively simple, and that "there are layers of sonics beneath the smooth surface". He says that ABBA's "mastery of this Cold Wave keyboard sound" could have seen the band "seamlessly ma[k]e the transition into the [1980s]", using "The Day Before You Came" as a template for the new sound. He concludes the analysis with: "the song is the ultimate tease, a door left ajar, a murder mystery with its final page torn out...which arguably makes it all the more wonderful".

On 5 December 2010 on British TV for ITV1 a poll was made where fans could vote for "The Nation's Favourite ABBA song". Despite its poor chart position of No. 32 in the UK back in 1982, "The Day Before You Came" was voted the third favourite ABBA song.

== Personnel ==
ABBA

- Agnetha Fältskog – lead vocals
- Anni-Frid Lyngstad – backing vocals
- Björn Ulvaeus – guitar
- Benny Andersson – keyboards, synthesizer

Additional musicians

- Åke Sundqvist – snare drums

== Charts ==
=== Weekly charts ===
Weekly chart performance for "The Day Before You Came"
Chart (1982)	Peak position
Argentina (CAPIF)	6
Australia (Kent Music Report)	48
Austria (Ö3 Austria Top 40)	16
Belgium (Ultratop 50 Flanders)	3
Bolivia (UPI)	9
Canada Adult Contemporary (RPM)	5
European Singles (Europarade)	2
Finland (Suomen virallinen lista)	1
Ireland (IRMA)	12
Netherlands (Dutch Top 40)	3
Netherlands (Single Top 100)	3
Norway (VG-lista)	5
Spain (AFYVE)	29
Sweden (Sverigetopplistan)	3
Switzerland (Schweizer Hitparade)	4
UK Singles (Official Charts)	32
West Germany (GfK)	5

=== Year-end charts ===
Year-end chart performance for "The Day Before You Came"
Chart (1982)	Position
Belgium (Ultratop 50 Flanders)	30
Netherlands (Dutch Top 40)	65
Netherlands (Single Top 100)	29

== Blancmange version ==
"The Day Before You Came"

Single by Blancmange

from the album Mange Tout
- B-side: "All Things Are Nice"
- Released: 6 July 1984
- Genre: Synth-pop
- Length: 4:20
- Label: London
- Songwriters: Benny Andersson; Björn Ulvaeus
- Producer: Peter Collins

Blancmange singles chronology
"Don't Tell Me" (1984)	"The Day Before You Came" (1984)	"What's Your Problem" (1985)

In 1984, two years after the song's original release, the first cover version of "The Day Before You Came" was released by British synth-pop duo Blancmange. In this version Marilyn French was changed to Barbara Cartland in the lyrics. This version includes a brief interpolation of the Coronation Street theme song after the line "there's not I think a single episode of Dallas that I didn't see." A further change was the addition of the line "It's a rich man's world" after an instrumental interlude, presumably a reference to the Abba song Money Money Money. The cover charted at No. 22 in the UK Singles Chart and was included on that year's Mange Tout album as the final track.

=== Track listings ===
- 7"
1. "The Day Before You Came" – 4:20
2. "All Things Are Nice" (Version) – 4:16
- 12"
1. "The Day Before You Came" (Extended Version) – 7:58
2. "Feel Me" (Live Version) – 6:24
3. "All Things Are Nice" (Version) – 4:12

=== Charts ===
Chart (1984)	Peak position
Belgium (VRT Top 30)	39
Germany (Media Control Charts)	52
Ireland (IRMA)	25
UK Singles (OCC)	22

== Cover versions ==
A Dutch-language version titled "Met kerst ben ik alleen" (Translation: I'm alone at Christmas) by André Hazes. The song peaked at number 3 in the Dutch Single Top 100 in 1982-1983. In 2004-2005, the song re-entered the Dutch Single Top 100 at number 5 and the Belgian Ultratop Singles Top 50 chart at number 47.

On her sixth studio album The Cappuccino Songs (1998), the British singer-songwriter Tanita Tikaram included a "music box" cover version of "The Day Before You Came" with a noticeably jazz-influenced arrangement.

"The Day Before You Came" was recorded by Meryl Streep for the soundtrack of Mamma Mia! Here We Go Again. Her version was released on 13 July 2018 alongside the rest of the soundtrack.

Pulp covered the song for their BBC Radio 2 Piano Room performance in February 2026 with the BBC Concert Orchestra.
