= God's Kitchen =

Single by Blancmange

from the album Happy Families
- A-side: "I've Seen the Word" (double A-side)
- Released: 26 March 1982
- Genre: Synth-pop; dance-pop
- Length: 2:55
- Label: London
- Songwriters: Neil Arthur; Stephen Luscombe
- Producer: Mike Howlett

Blancmange singles chronology
"Irene & Mavis" (1980)	"God's Kitchen" (1982)	"Feel Me" (1982)

"God's Kitchen" is a song by the English synth-pop duo Blancmange, released on 26 March 1982 as a double A-side with "I've Seen the Word". It was the lead single from the duo's debut studio album Happy Families (1982). "God's Kitchen" and "I've Seen the Word" were written by Neil Arthur and Stephen Luscombe, and produced by Mike Howlett. The single reached No. 65 in the UK and remained on the charts for two weeks.

In a 2011 interview with Penny Black Music, Arthur considered the song to be "fairly bleak". He recalled of the song to FutureMusic, "If I'd have only ever had one record with Blancmange, like 'God's Kitchen' then that would have sufficed. I remember hearing that track for the first time on Radio 1's Peter Powell Show and we drove across three lanes of the motorway we were so excited."

== Critical reception ==
Upon its release, Richard Cook of the NME called the single "nearly remarkable" as Blancmange "mark out a disquieting territory somewhere between the harder syntechnicians like Eyeless in Gaza and Tuxedomoon and the iron-throated unpleasantries of the likes of Bauhaus, though singer Neil Arthur's checked mania reminds me mostly of David Byrne". He added that "God's Kitchen" "bowls in on a recurrently massive bass keyboard, shakes in the harrowing grip of Arthur's voice and throws a wispy shroud of melodic detail over the outskirts of a stingingly clear production". He concluded, "I think it's slightly overstretched – still, a troubling and determined beginning." Dave Rimmer of Smash Hits was less positive, remarking that it was a "pity they didn't take time out to find a good tune", but added the single had a "brill sleeve though".

In a retrospective review of Happy Families (1982), Bill Cassel of AllMusic considered "God's Kitchen" as one of the album's highlights. Paul Scott-Bates of Louder Than War noted the song's "raunchy, dismembered sound" compared with the more "ballad-like" and "melodious" "I've Seen the Word".

== Track listings ==
7" single

1. "I've Seen the Word" – 3:01
2. "God's Kitchen" – 2:53

12" single

1. "God's Kitchen" – 4:27
2. "I've Seen the Word" – 3:01

== Personnel ==
Blancmange

- Neil Arthur – lead vocals
- Stephen Luscombe – keyboards, synthesizers

Additional personnel

- David Rhodes – guitar
- Mike Howlett – producer
- Tim Young – mastering

== Charts ==
Chart (1982)	Peak position
UK Singles Chart	65
