= Blancmange (band) =

English synth-pop band

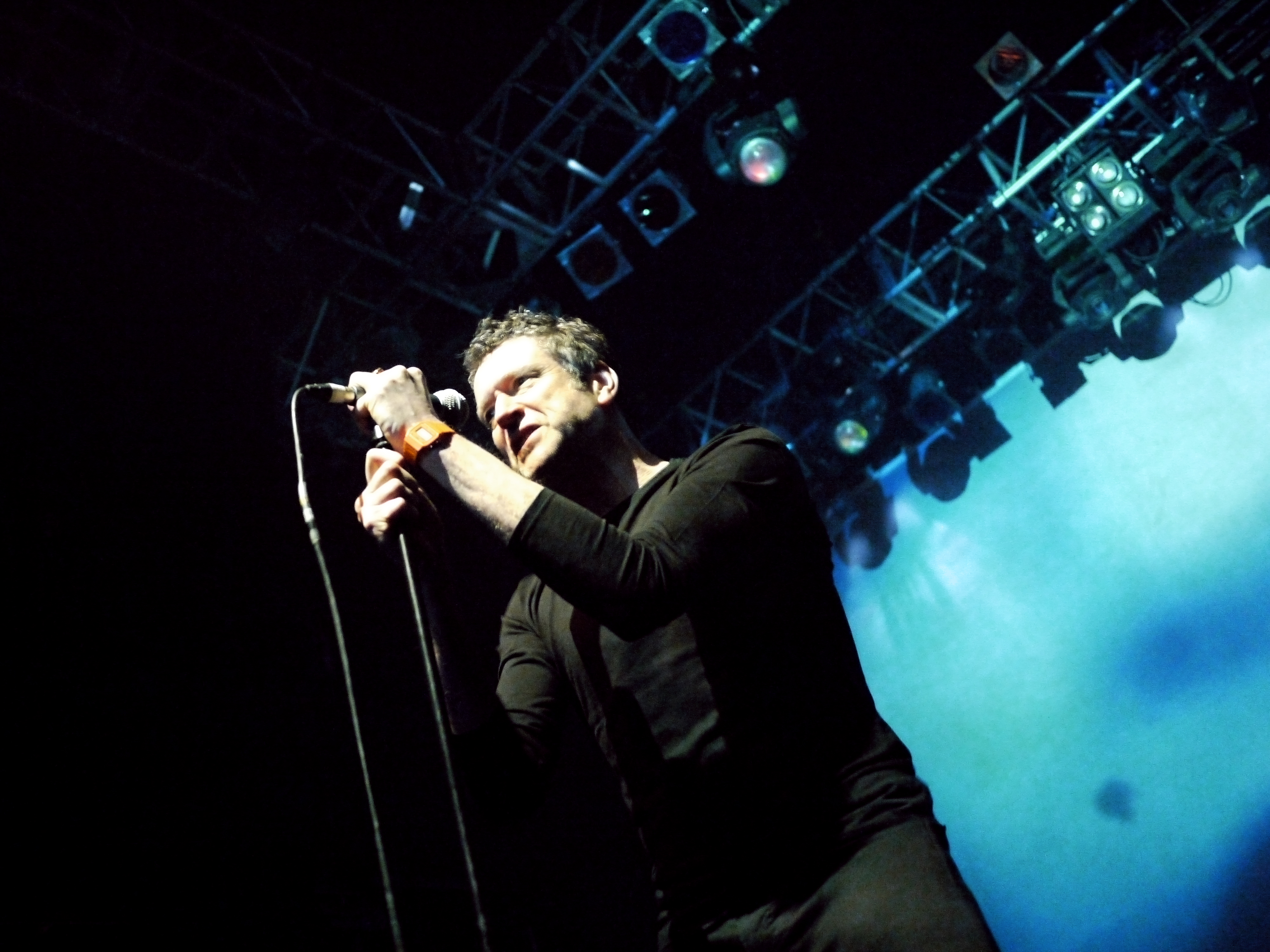
- Neil Arthur as Blancmange performing live at KOKO in London, 2011

Background information
- Origin: Harrow, London, England
- Genres: Synth-pop; new wave; alternative dance
- Years active: 1979–1986; 2006–present
- Labels: London; Proper; Sire; Warner; Blanc Check; Cherry Red
- Members: Neil Arthur
- Past members: Stephen Luscombe (died 2025); Laurence Stevens
- Website: blancmange.co.uk

Blancmange (/bləˈmɒ̃ʒ, -ˈmɑːnʒ, -ˈmɒnʒ/) are an English synth-pop band formed in Harrow, London, in 1979, and a two-piece for much of its existence, initially composed of Neil Arthur (vocals) and Stephen Luscombe (keyboards). It came to prominence in the early 1980s, releasing four UK top-20 singles: "Living on the Ceiling", "Waves", "Blind Vision" and "Don't Tell Me". Blancmange released three studio albums during that decade: Happy Families (1982), Mange Tout (1984) and Believe You Me (1985).

The duo amicably broke up in 1986 but reformed in the late 2000s, and in 2011 released their fourth studio album, Blanc Burn. Luscombe left following the release due to ill health, and died in 2025. Since then, Arthur alone has continued to perform under the Blancmange name, releasing over a dozen new studio albums and a re-recording of the band's debut studio album, titled Happy Families Too... (2013). He has also been involved in a further three collaborative albums as Fader (with Benge) and Near Future (with Jez Bernholz).

== Biography ==
=== Formation ===
Blancmange were formed in Harrow, London, in 1979 by lead vocalist Neil Arthur (born 15 June 1958, Darwen, Lancashire), instrumentalists Stephen Luscombe (born 29 October 1954, Hillingdon, Middlesex) and Laurence Stevens. Stevens left shortly after the band was formed, and Arthur and Luscombe continued as a duo. The group's name derived from the dessert of the same name. The duo released their first EP, Irene and Mavis, the following year, but their first real exposure came via the track "Sad Day" on the compilation album Some Bizzare Album (1981), alongside acts such as Soft Cell and Depeche Mode. This led to them signing a recording contract with London Records. In December 1981 they supported Japan on their "Visions of China" UK tour. Smash Hits described the band's sound as drawing on artists such as OMD, Simple Minds and Talking Heads.

=== Success ===
The duo found minor success with their 1982 double A-side single "God's Kitchen"/"I've Seen the Word", which peaked at No. 65 in the UK. This was followed by "Feel Me", which peaked at No. 46. Later that year, they broke through with "Living on the Ceiling", which reached No. 7 on the UK Singles Chart and was an international hit. Their debut studio album, Happy Families (which featured a sleeve painting in the style of Louis Wain and of the cover artwork of Enid Blyton's books), also reached the top 30.

Further hits followed with "Waves" (No. 19), "Blind Vision" (No. 10), "That's Love, That It Is" (No. 33) and "Don't Tell Me" (No. 8), while their second studio album Mange Tout (1984) also reached No. 8 on the UK Albums Chart. The album featured a cover version of ABBA's "The Day Before You Came", which reached No. 22 in the UK (ten places higher than Abba's original less than two years earlier). However, after this, the band's fortunes declined. Their 1985 single "What's Your Problem" only reached No. 40, and the subsequent studio album Believe You Me (1985) spent only two weeks on the UK Albums Chart, peaking at No. 54. The duo announced that they were breaking up in June 1986 after a Greenpeace concert at London's Royal Albert Hall. In 2008, Edsel re-released the three original studio albums as expanded versions.

Luscombe released an album of Indian-influenced music, New Demons, with Pandit Dinesh, Peter Culshaw, Priya Khajuria and Asha Bhosle under the name West India Company, in 1989. Meanwhile, Arthur released his debut solo studio album, Suitcase, in 1994, which spawned the singles "One Day, One Time" (UK No. 80, 1992) and "I Love I Hate" (UK No. 50, 1994).

=== Reformed ===
Following a gap of a quarter of a century, Blancmange reunited and released their fourth studio album, Blanc Burn, in March 2011. After suffering from an abdominal aortic aneurysm, Luscombe was forced to leave the band. Since then Arthur elected to continue recording and performing as Blancmange, with the assistance of session musicians.

Blancmange performed a UK tour in November 2013, during which they played their debut studio album Happy Families (1982) in its entirety at each show. They also released a new album, Happy Families Too..., featuring updated recordings of the original tracks from their 1982 debut album. Initially, the new album was only available to buy on the tour, but a digital download followed and a physical CD was released on 7 April 2014 which included four brand new remixes.

On 2 December 2014, the official Blancmange website announced details of a new studio album for release on 23 March 2015 on Cherry Red Records. The album, Semi Detached, contains ten tracks. On 9 March 2015, the first single from Semi Detached, "Paddington", was released as a digital download. The second single from the album, "Useless", was announced for release on 11 May 2015.

On 23 April 2015, Blancmange announced a new album of instrumental music titled Nil by Mouth. This release was initially only available for purchase at the band's two shows at London's Red Gallery in May 2015. It subsequently became available as a CD through the official Blancmange website on 25 September 2015. On 29 May 2015, Blancmange announced the release of their cover of Can's "I Want More" as a limited edition 12" record for Record Store Day, making it the third single from Semi Detached.

Commuter 23, a studio album containing 14 tracks, was released on 11 March 2016. On 20 March 2017, the band announced on their website that a new studio album, Unfurnished Rooms, would be released on 22 September 2017. On 23 June 2017, Fader, a new musical project between Neil Arthur and Benge, released their debut studio album, First Light. It was preceded by a single, "I Prefer Solitude", on 7 June 2017. In August 2017, Edsel Records released the 9-CD boxset The Blanc Tapes that expanded each of the three 1980s albums over three discs with additional material and liner notes by Neil Arthur.

In February 2018, Near Future, another side project comprising Neil Arthur and Jez Bernholz (from Gazelle Twin), announced that they would release their debut studio album, Ideal Home, on 25 May 2018. In April 2018, Blancmange announced a forthcoming studio album, Wanderlust, and a UK tour in November. In July 2019, In Shadow, the second studio album by the Fader project (Neil Arthur and Benge), was announced for release on 18 October 2019.

An instrumental album by Blancmange, Nil by Mouth II, was released on 22 November 2019 as a limited-edition run of 1000 copies. The album was released on a larger scale on CD in June 2020. A new album, titled Mindset, preceded by a single with the same title in February, was released in June 2020.

The trio of Arthur, Vince Clarke and Benge as the supergroup Doublespeak released their self-titled debut album on 29 May 2026.

== Discography ==
- Happy Families (1982)
- Mange Tout (1984)
- Believe You Me (1985)
- Blanc Burn (2011)
- Happy Families Too... (2013)
- Semi Detached (2015)
- Nil by Mouth (2015)
- Commuter 23 (2016)
- Unfurnished Rooms (2017)
- Wanderlust (2018)
- Nil by Mouth II (2019)
- Waiting Room (Volume 1) (2020)
- Mindset (2020)
- Expanded Mindset (2020)
- Nil by Mouth III (2021)
- Commercial Break (2021)
- Nil by Mouth IV/V (2022)
- Private View (2022)
- Nil by Mouth VI (2024)
- Waiting Room (Volume 2) (2025)
