= Waves (Blancmange song) =

Single by Blancmange

from the album Happy Families
- B-side: "Game Above My Head"
- Released: 11 February 1983
- Genre: Orchestral pop
- Length: 4:10
- Label: London
- Songwriters: Neil Arthur; Stephen Luscombe
- Producer: Mike Howlett

Blancmange singles chronology
"Living on the Ceiling" (1982)	"Waves" (1983)	"Blind Vision" (1983)

Music video
- "Waves" on YouTube

"Waves" is a song by the English synth-pop duo Blancmange, released on 11 February 1983 as the fourth and final single from their debut studio album Happy Families (1982). Written by Neil Arthur and Stephen Luscombe, and produced by Mike Howlett, "Waves" reached No. 19 in the UK and remained in the charts for nine weeks.

In a 2016 interview with M Magazine, Arthur recalled of writing the song: "I had a summer job where I had to sit in this caravan handing out concrete slabs to builders. Most of the day I did nothing. It was a glorious summer and I just sat and wrote "I've Seen the Word", "I Can't Explain", "Waves". They were so minimal but Stephen laid these lovely melodies over the top."

== Critical reception ==
Upon its release, Smash Hits wrote, "After the brilliant 'Living on the Ceiling', this is rotten. Neil Arthur puts on his Martin Fry tuxedo, dives head-first into the sea of strings... and drowns." Adrian Thrills of the NME was critical of the song's "over-production", calling it a "mournful single that revels in its contrived sense of 'epic' from the vocalist's Mario Lanza bellow to the opaque electronic curtains of sound that cascade massively from the back walls of the studio". He believed it would be a "big hit", but concluded, "Blancmange are trying very hard. They have even roped in Madeline Bell on backing vocals and introduced some 'real' strings, but it was all done so much more convincingly a few years ago on 'Atmosphere'." In a retrospective review of Happy Families (1982), John Bergstrom of PopMatters considered the song to be reminiscent of ABC and described it as "grandiose, orchestrated pop". Graeme Marsh of MusicOMH felt the song was "more serious sounding" and a "slower gem".

== Track listing ==
7" single

1. "Waves" – 4:10
2. "Game Above My Head" – 4:00

12" single

1. "Waves" – 4:06
2. "Business Steps" – 4:27
3. "Game Above My Head (Extended Version)" – 7:15

12" single (Australasian release)

1. "Waves (Full Length Dance Version)" – 8:34
2. "Living on the Ceiling" – 5:35

== Personnel ==
Blancmange

- Neil Arthur – lead vocals, producer of "Game Above My Head"
- Stephen Luscombe – keyboards, synthesizers, producer of "Game Above My Head" and "Business Steps"

Additional personnel

- Madeline Bell, Stevie Lange – backing vocals on "Waves"
- Bobby Collins – bass on "Game Above My Head"
- Mike Howlett – producer of "Waves"
- Linton Naiff – string arrangement on "Waves"
- Dennis Weinrich – remixing of "Waves"
- John Williams – remixing of "Waves", producer of "Game Above My Head"

Other

- Keith Breeden, Blancmange – sleeve design
- Helen Turner, Peter Ashworth – photography

== Charts ==
Chart (1983)	Peak position
Australian Singles Chart	99
Dutch Singles Chart	50
German Singles Chart	29
Irish Singles Chart	24
New Zealand Singles Chart	33
South African Singles Chart	24
UK Singles Chart	19
