= Pandit Dinesh =

Indian composer and percussionist (born 1955)

Pandit Dinesh (born 29 May 1955) is a music composer and percussionist specializing in Indian rhythms. He uses the tabla and conga drums. Dinesh is known for his collaborations with DJ Luck & MC Neat, The Outhere Brothers and West India Company, Dizrhythmia, The Pax Trio, and Blancmange. He is sometimes referred to as the "Godfather of Percussion".

== Film & TV scores ==
Dinesh composed the music for a number of films and TV series, including "London Life" and the BBC Four mini-series India's Frontier Railways.

== Live performances ==
Dinesh last performed at The Forge in Camden, London on 5 February 2015 at a night hosted by the Bagri Foundation.
