= Living on the Ceiling =

Single by Blancmange

from the album Happy Families and Happy Families Too...
- B-side: "Running Thin"; "I Would" (12" only)
- Released: 15 October 1982
- Genre: Synth-pop; dance-pop; new wave
- Length: 4:02
- Label: London
- Songwriters: Stephen Luscombe; Neil Arthur
- Producer: Mike Howlett

Blancmange singles chronology
"Feel Me" (1982)	"Living on the Ceiling" (1982)	"Waves" (1983)

Music video
- "Living on the Ceiling" on YouTube

"Living on the Ceiling" is a song by the English synth-pop band Blancmange. It was released as the band's third single on 15 October 1982, taken from their debut studio album Happy Families. It became the band's first (and biggest) UK top 40 hit, peaking at No. 7 on the UK Singles Chart and being certified silver by the BPI for sales in excess of 200,000 copies. The single also reached No. 5 on the Australian singles chart.

Blancmange performed the song on Top of the Pops, but for broadcast on the show as well as on BBC Radio, the track was edited to replace the lyric "Up the bloody tree" with "Up the cuckoo tree". However, in a subsequent episode of Top of the Pops where the song was used as the 'play-out track' without the band in the studio, the original "bloody" lyric was left in and was clearly audible.

The song was used in an episode of Limmy's Show in 2011, where Limmy looped the "up the bloody tree" lyric for comedic effect. In an interview with The Quietus in 2020, frontman Neil Arthur joked that Limmy's version was "better" than the original.

== Style ==
Reporting a 2011 interview with lead singer Neil Arthur, Sarah Nixey suggested that ".. it was the Indian influences of Pandit Dinesh on tablas and Deepak Khazauchi on sitar who had both given 'Living on the Ceiling' its alluring flavour" describing the single as "Middle Eastern tinged". Of the album from which it was drawn Nixey wrote: "Fusing the rhythmic dash of Talking Heads with the intensity of Joy Division plus the melodic framework of OMD and Yazoo on top, Arthur and Luscombe won critical admiration and respectable sales for their debut."

== Music video ==
The promotional video, made to accompany the song, was set in Cairo, Egypt, and was directed by Clive Richardson.

== Chart performance ==
=== Weekly charts ===
Chart (1982–1983)	Peak position
Australia (Kent Music Report)	5
Ireland (IRMA)	8
New Zealand (Recorded Music NZ)	41
South Africa (Springbok Radio)	3
UK Singles (Official Charts)	7
US Billboard Hot Dance Club Play	52

=== Year-end charts ===
Year-end chart performance for "Living on the Ceiling"
Chart (1983)	Position
Australia (Kent Music Report)	58
