= Stephen Luscombe =

British musician and songwriter (1954–2025)

- Born: 29 October 1954; Hillingdon, Middlesex, England
- Died: 13 September 2025 (aged 70)
- Occupations: Keyboardist; songwriter
- Years active: 1974−2011
- Musical career
- Origin: London, England
- Genres: Synth-pop; Indian pop

Stephen Luscombe (29 October 1954 – 13 September 2025) was an English instrumentalist and co-founder of the 1980s synth-pop band Blancmange.

== Early life ==
Stephen Luscombe was born in Hillingdon, Middlesex, England on 29 October 1954. He studied at the Harrow School of Art. When his music career took off, he was a longtime resident in London's Notting Hill.

== Career ==
In 1974, Luscombe joined an experimental orchestra named the Portsmouth Sinfonia. He played violin. Brian Eno played clarinet in the orchestra. The orchestra was founded by the composer Gavin Bryars at Portsmouth School of Art, who encouraged anyone to join, no matter their level of musicianship. The outfit recorded an album titled Portsmouth Sinfonia Plays The Popular Classics, produced by Brian Eno. They also performed a concert at London's Royal Albert Hall. The American conductor Leonard Bernstein was so enthusiastic about them, he invited them to perform at New York's Carnegie Hall.

Luscombe started his pop career playing gigs supporting bands in little pubs up and down the United Kingdom. Luscombe was best known for being an multi-instrumentalist in Blancmange alongside musician Neil Arthur and Laurence Stevens. They came to prominence in the early 1980s, releasing four UK top-20 singles: "Living on the Ceiling", "Waves", "Blind Vision" and "Don't Tell Me". Following a gap of a quarter of a century, Blancmange reunited and released their fourth studio album, Blanc Burn, in March 2011. After suffering from an abdominal aortic aneurysm, Luscombe was forced to leave the band. Subsequently, Arthur elected to continue recording and performing as Blancmange, with the assistance of session musicians. Luscombe's influences and interests included Brian Eno, Can, Captain Beefheart and Frank Zappa.

In 1990, after Blancmange had disbanded, Luscombe collaborated with Boy George to create The West India Company, a music project that explored and fused traditional Indian music with Western pop. Some of the recordings notably feature the legendary Indian vocalist Asha Bhosle. The pair also recorded a version of the ABBA classic, "I Have A Dream", which was never commercially released.

Luscombe also worked on many projects with the famed percussionist Pandit Dinesh.

== Film soundtracks ==
Luscombe was the music arranger for the movie soundtrack of the 1998 Indian movie, Prem Aggan. He also contributed music for the soundtrack of the documentary, The Legend of Leigh Bowery (2002), and composed music for 3 episodes of the 2010 miniseries, Indian Hill Railway.

Luscombe/Blancmange songs featured in movie soundtracks include:

- "Lose Your Love" was featured in the movie soundtrack of Flight of the Navigator (1986).
- "Don't Tell Me" was featured in the movie soundtrack of No Man's Land (1987).
- "Blind Vision" was featured in the movie soundtrack of The Voyeurs (2021).

== Illness and death ==
Luscombe suffered from heart problems which forced him to retire. In 2012, he said he was unable to play on the various Blancmange tour dates due to an abdominal aortic aneurysm adding: "It wouldn't have been too clever to ignore that, and not fair on the boys to have that at the back of their minds. Turns out it's hereditary – and the latest scan recently showed no change – SOOO I won't be coming on the next adventure unfortunately".

Luscombe died on 13 September 2025, at the age of 70. His fellow band member, Neil Arthur, and fans shared tributes on social media.
