= Mr. Mister discography =

- Studio albums: 4
- Compilation albums: 8
- Singles: 9
- Music videos: 8

The discography of Mr. Mister, an American pop rock band, consists of four studio albums, two compilation albums, nine singles, and eight music videos. Mr. Mister was formed in 1982 by Richard Page and Steve George. Once the other two members, Steve Farris and Pat Mastelotto, joined the band, they were signed by RCA Records. In 1984, Mr. Mister released their debut album, I Wear the Face. The album peaked at number 170 on the Billboard 200 and did not chart internationally. I Wear the Face contained the single "Hunters of the Night", which peaked at number 57 on the US Billboard Hot 100.

Welcome to the Real World (1985) was Mr. Mister's second and most successful album. It topped the Billboard 200 and was certified platinum by the Recording Industry Association of America (RIAA). Internationally, it charted within the top 10 on the Canadian, Norwegian, UK and Swiss Albums Chart. The album was certified three-times platinum by Music Canada and gold by the British Phonographic Industry. Welcome to the Real World produced four singles, including "Broken Wings" and "Kyrie" which topped the Billboard Hot 100 as well as the Canadian Singles Chart, and were certified gold by Music Canada.

Mr. Mister released their third studio album, Go On..., in 1987. It peaked at number 55 on the Billboard 200. It charted within the top 15 on the Swedish, Norwegian, and Swiss Albums Chart The album appeared on the Canadian Albums Chart and was certified gold by Music Canada. Go On... spawned four singles, but only "Something Real" appeared on music charts, appearing in the top 40 of the Billboard Hot 100 and the Canadian Singles Chart.

On the verge of releasing their fourth album, Pull, Steve Farris departed from the band and Mr. Mister broke up in 1989. From 1999 to 2010, seven compilation albums were released: Broken Wings: The Encore Collection (1999), Best Selection (1999), Broken Wings: Best of Mister Mister (1999), The Best of Mr. Mister (2001), Masters (2002), Broken Wings (2010). Pull was finally released in 2010. Mr. Mister followed the release of Pull with their eighth compilation album, Playlist: The Best of Mr. Mister (2011). None of the albums impacted any charts.

== Albums ==
=== Studio albums ===
List of studio albums, with selected chart positions
Title	Album details	Peak chart positions										Certifications
Title	Album details	US	AUS	GER	AUT	CAN	NOR	NZ	SWE	SWI	UK	Certifications
I Wear the Face	Released: March 27, 1984; Label: RCA; Format: CD, LP	170	—	—	—	—	—	—	—	—	—	
Welcome to the Real World	Released: June 20, 1985; Label: RCA; Format: CD, LP	1	17	8	12	2	2	21	13	10	6	RIAA: Platinum; MC: 3× Platinum; GLF: Gold; BPI: Gold
Go On...	Released: September 8, 1987; Label: RCA; Format: CD, LP	55	67	52	—	36	13	—	9	15	—	MC: Gold
Pull	Released: November 23, 2010; Label: Little Dume; Format: CD	—	—	—	—	—	—	—	—	—	—	
"—" denotes releases that did not chart or were not released in that territory.

=== Compilation albums ===
List of compilation albums
Title	Album details
Broken Wings: The Encore Collection	Released: March 30, 1999; Label: Bertelsmann; Format: CD, CS
Best Selection	Released: September 28, 1999; Label: MVP; Format: CD
Broken Wings: Best of Mister Mister	Released: December 28, 1999; Label: Import; Format: CD
The Best of Mr. Mister	Released: April 17, 2001; Label: Buddha; Format: CD
Masters	Released: May 1, 2002; Label: Eagle; Format: CD
Broken Wings	Released: April 27, 2010; Label: Collectables; Format: CD
Playlist: The Very Best of Mr. Mister	Released: January 25, 2011; Label: RCA; Format: CD

== Singles ==
List of singles, with selected chart positions
Title	Year	Peak chart positions										Certifications	Album
Title	Year	US	AUT	CAN	NOR	NZ	SWE	SWI	UK	GER	AUS	Certifications	Album
"Hunters of the Night"	1984	57	—	—	—	—	—	—	—	—	—		I Wear the Face
"Talk the Talk"	1984	—	—	—	—	—	—	—	—	—	—		I Wear the Face
"Broken Wings"	1985	1	17	1	4	13	14	4	4	8	4	MC: Gold; BPI: Gold	Welcome to the Real World
"Kyrie"	1985	1	5	1	1	30	6	3	11	7	11	MC: Gold; RMNZ: Gold	Welcome to the Real World
"Is It Love"	1986	8	—	20	—	—	—	—	87	42	91		Welcome to the Real World
"Black/White"	1986	—	—	93	—	—	—	—	—	—	—		Welcome to the Real World
"Something Real"	1987	29	—	38	—	—	—	—	—	—	—		Go On...
"Healing Waters"	1987	—	—	—	—	—	—	—	—	—	—		Go On...
"The Border"	1987	—	—	—	—	—	—	—	—	—	—		Go On...
"Stand and Deliver"	1988	—	—	—	—	—	—	—	—	—	—		Go On...
"—" denotes releases that did not chart or were not released in that territory.

== Music videos ==
List of music videos, with directors
Title	Year	Director(s)
"Hunters of the Night"	1984	—
"Broken Wings"	1985	Oley Sassone
"Kyrie"	1985	Nick Morris
"Is It Love"	1986	Oley Sassone
"Something Real"	1987	Zbigniew Rybczyński
"Healing Waters"	1987	Meiert Avis
"The Border"	1987	Meiert Avis
"Stand and Deliver"	1988	Tony Greco
"—" denotes unknown director due to a lack of sources.
