= Playlist: The Very Best of Mr. Mister =

Greatest hits album by Mr. Mister
- Released: January 25, 2011
- Recorded: 1984–2010
- Genre: Pop rock
- Length: 1:06:35
- Label: RCA; Legacy
- Producer: Mr. Mister; Peter McIan; Paul De Villiers; Kevin Killen

Mr. Mister chronology
Pull (2010)	Playlist: The Very Best of Mr. Mister (2011)

Playlist: The Very Best of Mr. Mister is a compilation album by American pop rock band Mr. Mister, released in 2011 by Legacy Recordings as part of their Playlist series. This compilation includes songs from the group's first four studio albums I Wear the Face, Welcome to the Real World, Go On... and Pull.

== Reception ==
Professional ratings
Review scores
Source	Rating
AllMusic	4/5 stars

Stephen Thomas Erlewine of AllMusic called the compilation "a worthwhile overview for all but the serious Mr. Mister fan".

== Track listing ==
No.	Title	Writer(s)	Album	Length
1.	"Hunters of the Night"	Richard Page, Steve George, John Lang, George Ghiz	I Wear the Face, 1984	5:10
2.	"I Get Lost Sometimes"	Richard Page, Steve George, John Lang	I Wear the Face, 1984	3:53
3.	"Life Goes On"	Richard Page, Steve George, John Lang, Pat Mastelotto	I Wear the Face, 1984	5:15
4.	"Broken Wings"	Richard Page, Steve George, John Lang	Welcome to the Real World, 1985	5:44
5.	"Kyrie"	Richard Page, Steve George, John Lang	Welcome to the Real World, 1985	4:26
6.	"Is It Love"	Richard Page, Steve George, John Lang, Pat Mastelotto	Welcome to the Real World, 1985	3:31
7.	"Black/White"	Richard Page, Steve George, John Lang, Pat Mastelotto, Steve Farris	Welcome to the Real World, 1985	4:20
8.	"Run to Her"	Richard Page, Steve George, Pat Mastelotto, Steve Farris	Welcome to the Real World, 1985	3:33
9.	"Healing Waters"	Richard Page, Steve George, John Lang	Go On..., 1987	5:06
10.	"The Border"	Richard Page, Steve George, John Lang	Go On..., 1987	5:41
11.	"Something Real (Inside Me/Inside You)"	Richard Page, Steve George, John Lang	Go On..., 1987	4:22
12.	"Waiting in My Dreams"	Richard Page, Steve George, John Lang	Pull, 2010	4:53
13.	"Learning to Crawl"	Richard Page, Steve George, John Lang, Pat Mastelotto	Pull, 2010	2:58
14.	"We Belong to No One"	Richard Page, Steve George, John Lang	Pull, 2010	3:41
15.	"[CD Rom Track]"
Total length:				1:06:35

== Release history ==
Country	Date	Label	Format	Catalog
United States	25 January 2011	SBME Special Markets	CD	888751506121
