= Broken Wings: The Encore Collection =

Compilation album by Mr. Mister
- Released: March 30, 1999
- Recorded: 1984–1987
- Genre: Pop rock
- Length: 47:48
- Label: RCA
- Producer: Paul De Villiers; Kevin Killen; Peter Mclan; Mr. Mister

Mr. Mister chronology
Go On... (1987)	Broken Wings: The Encore Collection (1999)	The Best of Mr. Mister (2001)

Broken Wings: The Encore Collection is the first US compilation album by American pop rock band Mr. Mister. It contains the hits "Broken Wings", "Kyrie", "Hunters of the Night", "Is It Love" and "Something Real (Inside Me/Inside You)". The album contains all full album versions of the songs except for "Broken Wings", which has its radio edit featured on this album.

== Track listing ==
All songs by Richard Page, Steve George and John Lang except where noted

1. "Broken Wings" (radio edit) – 4:39
2. "Is It Love" – 3:34
3. "Stand and Deliver" – 5:35
4. "Hunters of the Night" (Page, George, Lang, George Ghiz) – 5:10
5. "Welcome to the Real World" – 4:19
6. "Something Real (Inside Me/Inside You)" – 4:20
7. "The Border" – 5:40
8. "Kyrie" – 4:25
9. "I Wear the Face" – 4:54 (CD edition only)
10. "Life Goes On" – 5:12 (CD edition only)

== Personnel ==
- Richard Page – bass, double bass, vocals
- Steve Farris – guitars
- Pat Mastelotto – percussion
- Steve George – piano, synthesizer
