= The Best of Mr. Mister =

2001 greatest hits album by Mr. Mister

Greatest hits album by Mr. Mister
- Released: April 17, 2001 (US); October 7, 2002 (Japan)
- Recorded: 1984–1988
- Genre: Pop rock; soft rock
- Length: 52:57 (US); 78:16 (Japan)
- Label: Buddha (US); BMG (Japan)
- Producer: Paul De Villiers; Kevin Killen; Peter Mclan; Mr. Mister

Mr. Mister chronology
Broken Wings: The Encore Collection (1999)	The Best of Mr. Mister (2001)	Pull (2010)

Professional ratings
Review scores
Source	Rating
AllMusic	4/5 stars

The Best of Mr. Mister is a compilation album of American pop rock band Mr. Mister's hits and some of their other well-known songs. It contains the hits "Broken Wings", "Kyrie", "Hunters of the Night", "Is It Love", "Black/White" and "Something Real (Inside Me/Inside You)". It ends with the previously unreleased song entitled "Waiting in My Dreams" (which was originally intended for Pull, an album that would go unreleased until 2010).

All the tracks are single edits and are remastered from the original recordings.

== Track listing ==
All songs by Richard Page, Steve George and John Lang except where noted

=== US edition ===
1. "Broken Wings" – 4:44
2. "Is It Love" – 3:39
3. "Stand and Deliver" – 4:38
4. "Hunters of the Night" (Page, George, Lang, George Ghiz) – 4:07
5. "Run to Her" – 3:35
6. "Something Real (Inside Me/Inside You)" – 4:20
7. "Kyrie" – 4:14
8. "Black/White" – 4:18
9. "The Border" – 5:22
10. "Talk the Talk" – 4:11
11. "Healing Waters" – 4:56
12. "Waiting in My Dreams" – 4:53

=== Japan edition ===
1. "Broken Wings"
2. "Don't Slow Down"
3. "Kyrie"
4. "Something Real (Inside Me/Inside You)"
5. "Waiting in My Dreams"
6. "Partners in Crime"
7. "Watching the World"
8. "Hunters of the Night"
9. "Black/White"
10. "Power Over Me"
11. "Is It Love"
12. "Talk the Talk"
13. "Run to Her"
14. "Healing Waters"
15. "Welcome to the Real World"
16. "Control"
17. "The Border"

== Personnel ==
Mr. Mister

- Richard Page – bass, vocals, guitar on "Waiting in My Dreams"
- Steve George – keyboards, vocals
- Steve Farris – guitar (except on *"Waiting in My Dreams")
- Pat Mastelotto – drums

Additional personnel

- John Lang – lyrics
- Luis Conte – percussion on "Waiting in My Dreams"
- Buzz Feiten – *guitar
