= Pages (1981 album) =

Studio album by Pages
- Released: March 1981
- Recorded: May 1980 – January 1981
- Studios: Dawnbreaker Studios (Chatsworth); Garden Rake Studio (Studio City); Room 335 (Hollywood); Location Recorders (Burbank)
- Genres: Rock; soft rock
- Length: 37:58
- Label: Capitol
- Producers: Jay Graydon, Bobby Colomby

Pages chronology
Future Street (1979)	Pages (1981)

Singles from Pages
- 1. "You Need a Hero" Released: 1981; 2. "Come on Home" Released: 1981

Pages is the third and final studio album by American jazz rock band Pages. It was released in March 1981 by Capitol Records. It was their second self-titled album, after their debut.

== Background ==
In a turn of events paralleled to that of Donald Fagen and Walter Becker with Steely Dan, Pages had become less of a band by this album, featuring only Richard Page, Steve George, and lyricist John Lang as members. The rest of the musicians on the album were session players. Most of the album was produced, engineered, and mixed by guitarist and songwriter Jay Graydon between May and November 1980. Overdubs and mixing were done at Graydon's Garden Rake Studio. Bobby Colomby, who produced both of their previous albums, was brought in to record two more songs after most of the album was completed. Those songs, "You Need a Hero" and "Come on Home," were recorded between December 1980 and January 1981 with Colomby and his technical personnel.

== Reception ==
Two singles were released from the album, "You Need a Hero" and "Come on Home," neither of which charted. Page and George disbanded Pages later that year after a few live performances, and formed Mr. Mister in 1982.

== Track listing ==
All lyrics are written by John Lang and Richard Page, except "Automatic", written by John Lang; all music is composed by Richard Page and Steve George, with additional composers noted.

Side one
No.	Title	Music	Length
1.	"You Need a Hero"		3:43
2.	"Tell Me"		3:52
3.	"O.C.O.E. (Official Cat of the Eighties)"	Charles Johnson	5:00
4.	"Come on Home"	Jay Graydon	3:27

Side two
No.	Title	Music	Length
5.	"Sesatia"		4:37
6.	"Only a Dreamer"	Graydon	4:30
7.	"Automatic"	Johnson	3:59
8.	"Fearless"	Graydon	4:20
9.	"Midnight Angel"		4:30
Total length:			37:58

== Personnel ==
Credits adapted from the liner notes.

=== Pages ===
- Richard Page – lead vocals, background vocals, piano (9)
- Steve George – Fender Rhodes (1, 2, 4, 6, 8), Yamaha CS-80 (1–8), Minimoog (1, 2, 4, 6, 9), electric power oboe (2), piano (2, 3, 5, 7), Oberheim (4), Clavinet (5), ARP 2600 (7, 9), background vocals (1–6)

==== Additional musicians ====
- Steve Khan – guitar (1, 4)
- Charles Johnson – guitar (2, 3, 5, 7)
- Paul Jackson Jr. – guitar (4)
- Larry Carlton – guitar (6)
- Jay Graydon – guitar (6–8), programming (9)
- Neil Stubenhaus – bass (1–7)
- Abraham Laboriel – bass (8)
- Jeff Porcaro – drums (1, 4, 7)
- Ralph Humphrey – drums (2, 8)
- Vinnie Colaiuta – drums (3, 5)
- Mike Baird – drums (6)
- Paulinho da Costa – percussion (1, 4)
- Tom Scott – saxophone (4)
- Al Jarreau – vocal flute effect (9)

=== Technical ===
- Produced and mixed by Bobby Colomby (1, 4) and Jay Graydon (2, 3, 5–9)
- Engineered by Michael Verdick (1, 4), Jay Graydon and Joe Bogan (2, 3, 5–9), and Larry Carlton (6)
- Second engineers – Scott Singer (1, 4), Brian Behrns (2, 3, 5–9), and Steve Carlton (6)
- Mixed by Michael Verdick (1, 4)
- Mastered by Kevin Gray at The Cutting System (Burbank, CA)
- Art direction – Roy Kohara
- Photography – Phil Fewsmith
