= Shelter Me (Richard Page album) =

Debut studio album by American singer-songwriter Richard Page

Studio album by Richard Page
- Released: October 22, 1996
- Studio: Rumbo Studios; The Barn; (Los Angeles, California); The Little Dume Studios (Malibu, California)
- Genre: Adult contemporary
- Length: 45:19
- Label: Blue Thumb
- Producer: Richard Page; Kim Bullard

Richard Page chronology
Shelter Me (1996)	Peculiar Life (2010)

Singles from Shelter Me
- 1. "The Best Thing" Released: 1996; 2. "Shelter Me" Released: 1997; 3. "My Oxygen" Released: 1997

Shelter Me is the debut studio album by American singer-songwriter Richard Page, released on October 22, 1996, by Blue Thumb Records. It remained Page's only solo studio album until the release of Peculiar Life (2010), fourteen years later. Page dedicated the album to the memory of his mother, Joyce Horton Page, who died in the same year it was released.

As part of Shelter Me's promotion, a bonus extended play (EP) called Acoustic was also distributed by Blue Note Records.

== Background ==
According to Page, Shelter Me was a "bittersweet experience", because while the album was creatively fulfilling for him, Blue Thumb Records "fell apart" when he finished it:

So it was really kind of a horrible experience, and like I said it was a high and low experience — I loved the music, the creative part of it was fantastic. But then it was bungled, and literally just lost in the shuffle. It kind of left a bad taste in my mouth about what I wanted to do and how much more time I wanted to put into something that might not see the light of day.

All other Mr. Mister's members were involved in the album's production. "My Oxygen" was originally written by Nik Kershaw as "Oxygen", and was first recorded by Elaine Paige in her album Love Can Do That (1991). Page wrote three additional verses for his version, which was later covered by Avalon in their album Oxygen (2001). "A Simple Life" was also sung by John Farnham and released as a single from his album Romeo's Heart (1996). "Heaven Is 10 Zillion Light Years Away" is a cover version of a 1974 Stevie Wonder song.

== Reception ==
Professional ratings
Review scores
Source	Rating
Allmusic	3/5 stars

A reviewer from Billboard called Shelter Me's lead single "The Best Thing" a "breezy love song" which "captures [Page's] knack for fine pop songwriting" while being "a promising preview to the forthcoming album."

== Track listing ==
All tracks produced by Richard Page and Kim Bullard.

No.	Title	Writer(s)	Length
1.	"The Best Thing"	Richard Page; Marc Jordan	4:35
2.	"My Oxygen"	Nik Kershaw; Page	4:13
3.	"Even the Pain"	Page	5:50
4.	"Shelter Me"	Page	5:21
5.	"Let Me Down Easy"	Page; Jon Lind	3:26
6.	"A Simple Life"	Page; Lind	4:05
7.	"Dependence"	Page	5:25
8.	"Just to Love You"	Page	3:58
9.	"If All Else Fails"	Page	5:38
10.	"Heaven Is 10 Zillion Light Years Away"	Stevie Wonder	4:48
Total length:			45:19

== Personnel ==
Credits adapted from the album's liner notes.

=== Musicians ===
- Cecelia Bullard – backing vocals
- Kim Bullard – production, electric organ, electric piano, synthesizers, keyboards
- Carmen Carter – backing vocals
- Luis Conte – percussion
- Lance Eaton – backing vocals
- Steve Farris – electric guitar
- Denny Fongheiser – drums
- Steve George – backing vocals
- James Harrah – electric guitar, acoustic guitar, classic guitar
- Jimmy Johnson – bass
- Marc Jordan – songwriting
- Nik Kershaw – songwriting
- Jon Lind – songwriting
- Jerry Marotta – drums, percussion, ocarina
- Pat Mastelotto – percussion, drum machine programming
- Keith McCabe – mandolin
- Arnold McCuller – backing vocals
- Tollak Ollestad – harmonica
- Richard Page – lead vocals, backing vocals, songwriting, production, acoustic piano, electric piano, grand piano, acoustic guitar, keyboards
- John Pierce – bass
- Louis Price – backing vocals
- Rick Sailon – violin
- Suzanne Teng – flute
- Michael Thompson – electric guitar, acoustic guitar
- Stevie Wonder – songwriting

=== Technical ===
- Shawn Berman – engineering
- Kim Bullard – engineering
- Doug Sax – mastering
- Elliot Scheiner – mixing
- Bill Smith – engineering

=== Design ===
- Laurie Goldman – graphic design
- Dennis Keeley – photography
- E.J. Kempf – typography
- Robin Lynch – art direction

== Acoustic EP ==
Acoustic

EP by Richard Page
- Released: October 22, 1996
- Genre: Acoustic
- Length: 23:56
- Label: Blue Note
- Producer: Kim Bullard

Acoustic is a promotional bonus extended play (EP) by Richard Page, released on October 22, 1996, by Blue Note Records. For a limited time, the EP was given to customers who bought Shelter Me. It features four alternate versions of selected songs from its parent album, plus a solo acoustic version of Mr. Mister's "Broken Wings".

=== Track listing ===
All tracks produced by Kim Bullard.

No.	Title	Writer(s)	Length
1.	"Broken Wings" (Acoustic version)	Richard Page; John Lang; Steve George	5:18
2.	"The Best Thing" (Acoustic version)	Page; Marc Jordan	4:35
3.	"A Simple Life" (Acoustic version)	Page	3:57
4.	"Even the Pain" (Acoustic version)	Page	5:13
5.	"Shelter Me" (Acoustic version)	Page	5:33
Total length:			23:56

=== Personnel ===
Credits adapted from the EP's liner notes.

- Kim Bullard – production, engineering, organ
- Denny Fongheiser – drums, percussion
- Steve George – songwriting
- James Harrah – guitar
- Marc Jordan – songwriting
- Mike Landy – mastering
- John Lang – songwriting
- Richard Page – vocals, songwriting, acoustic guitar, acoustic piano
- John Pierce – bass
