= Pull (Mr. Mister album) =

Studio album by Mr. Mister
- Released: November 23, 2010
- Recorded: 1989–1990
- Studio: Sunset Sound (Hollywood); Ocean Way (Hollywood); Southcombe (Burbank); American Recorders (Calabasas); The Sound Factory (Hollywood); Soundcastle (Los Angeles); Record One (Los Angeles); Enterprise (Burbank)
- Genre: Rock
- Length: 51:30
- Label: Little Dume Recordings
- Producer: Mr. Mister; Paul De Villiers

Mr. Mister chronology
The Best of Mr. Mister (2001)	Pull (2010)	Playlist: The Very Best of Mr. Mister (2011)

Pull is the fourth and final studio album by American pop rock band Mr. Mister, and the only album not to feature founding guitarist Steve Farris, who had departed the band in 1988. It was recorded from 1989 to 1990, but the record company refrained from releasing this more introspective album. Due to the band's being left without a record company and a subsequent breakup, the album was left without an official release until 2010, when it was remixed and released by Richard Page's own Little Dume Recordings label.

The album was made available as a physical CD plus digital download.

No singles were released from this album, although one track ("We Belong to No One") was offered as a free download from the Little Dume website while the album was being prepped for release. Also, "Waiting in My Dreams" was first featured on the band's The Best of Mr. Mister compilation album.

== Background ==
After the band's 1987 album Go On... did not fare as well commercially as its predecessor Welcome to the Real World, the band returned to the studio in the fall of 1988 to record their fourth studio album, which became Pull. The band decided to record material that had "more air and acoustic" within them, essentially opting for a more organic approach. Producer Paul DeVilliers pushed the band to experiment with more piano, organ and real percussion. However, when the album was presented to RCA, which had just been taken over by BMG Ariola, the company responded "we don't know what to do with this". The label felt the album's material was too experimental, and therefore not commercial. This resulted in the label refusing to release the album, which still needed to undertake final mixing. The band did approach other labels with the record, but with no success they soon disbanded.

Before the album's official 2010 release, Pull was leaked unofficially, resulting in various bootleg copies of the album appearing on the Internet. These featured various fan-made album covers. After years of trying to release the album, Page was helped by Jeremy Holiday in getting the album released independently. Page wanted to make the album available to fans, who had been "hounding me about this album for years". Speaking to Mike Duquette in 2010, Page added: "The bootleg copies just don't cut it, and people have made up their own titles, so it's finally good to just set the record straight, to say, "here's how we wanted it to sound," and remaster it with Bob Ludwig."

In 2020, Mr. Mister released an "Expanded Edition" of Pull containing three additional tracks: "Wheel of Life", "Slip Through My Fingers", and "Faith Unbroken". These three tracks were initially recorded during the Pull sessions but not completed. During 2018 and 2019, the band members completed the songs for inclusion on the expanded edition of Pull, enlisting session guitarist Tim Pierce to record additional guitar overdubs.

== Track listing ==
All tracks are written by Richard Page, Steve George and John Lang except where noted.

No.	Title	Writer(s)	Length
1.	"Learning to Crawl"	Richard Page; Steve George; John Lang; Pat Mastelotto	5:48
2.	"Waiting in My Dreams"		4:55
3.	"Crazy Boy"		3:29
4.	"Close Your Eyes"		4:44
5.	"Lifetime"		4:36
6.	"I Don't Know Why"	Page; George; Lang; Mastelotto	4:52
7.	"We Belong to No One"		4:55
8.	"Burning Bridge"		4:03
9.	"No Words to Say"	Page; George	5:23
10.	"Surrender"	Page; George; Lang; Mastelotto	4:27
11.	"Awaya"	Page; George; Mastelotto	4:20

2020 expanded edition bonus tracks
No.	Title	Writer(s)	Length
12.	"Wheel of Life"	Page; George; Lang; Mastelotto	4:10
13.	"Slip Through My Fingers"		5:18
14.	"Faith Unbroken"		4:30

== Personnel ==
Mr. Mister

- Richard Page – vocals, guitars, bass guitar
- Steve George – vocals, keyboards, soprano saxophone
- Pat Mastelotto – drums, percussion

Additional musicians

- Buzz Feiten – guitars (1, 2, 4–7, 11)
- Trevor Rabin – guitars (1, 5, 6, 11), additional bass (1, 5, 11)
- Doug Macaskill – guitars (3, 11)
- Pete McRae – guitars (9, 10)
- Tim Pierce – guitars (12, 13, 14)
- Luis Conte – additional percussion (2, 5, 8, 11, 13)

=== Production ===
- Mr. Mister – producers, mixing
- Paul De Villiers – producer, engineer, mixing
- Kevin Killen – mixing (1–5, 8, 10)
- Lois Allen – assistant engineer
- Wayne O'Brian – assistant engineer
- Bob Ludwig – mastering
- Larry Vigon – art direction, design, illustration
- Leanne Nicholas – design
- Catanzaro and Mahdessian – photography
- George Ghiz – manager

Studios

- Recorded at Sunset Sound, The Sound Factory and Ocean Way Recording (Hollywood, CA); Record One, Soundcastle and Southcombe Studios (Los Angeles, CA); American Recorders (Calabasas, CA); The Enterprise (Burbank, CA).
- Mixed at Ocean Way Recording and Sunset Sound.
- Mastered at Gateway Mastering (Portland, ME).
