= Charles Foster Johnson =

American jazz musician and blogger

Charles Foster Johnson (born April 13, 1953) is an American blogger, software developer, and former jazz guitarist. He has played on 30 albums, sometimes credited as Icarus Johnson. He started the political blog Little Green Footballs in 2001.

== Biography ==
Johnson was born in New York and raised in Hawaii. He launched his first career (as a jazz guitarist) in the mid-1970s. Extensive recording credits include at least three albums that went gold: Reach For It by George Duke, School Days by Stanley Clarke, and Live in London by Al Jarreau. He was a member of Richard Page and Steve George's pre-Mr. Mister band, Pages and played on the band's biggest hit, "I Do Believe in You."

He later co-founded CodeHead Technologies, which marketed productivity and desktop publishing software (mostly written in assembly language) for the Atari ST personal computer. In 2001, Johnson founded a web design firm called "Little Green Footballs" with his brother Michael. Little Green Footballs began as a testbed on the company's website.

Johnson was raised Roman Catholic but now considers himself an agnostic.

Johnson is a co-founder of Pajamas Media, selling his stake in 2007.

== Killian memos ==
Charles Johnson's animated GIF comparison of purported 1970s era typewritten Killian memos with 2004-era Microsoft Word document using default settings

Johnson, and other bloggers, gained attention during the 2004 U.S. presidential election for their role in questioning the authenticity of several memos purporting to document irregularities in George W. Bush's National Guard service record. (See Killian documents and Killian documents authenticity issues.) CBS news anchor Dan Rather presented the memos as authentic in a September 8, 2004 report on 60 Minutes Wednesday, two months before the vote. Days after the broadcast, Johnson alleged the documents, supposedly typewritten in 1973, could have been created easily on a modern computer using Microsoft Word.

== Discography ==
- 1976 School Days with Stanley Clarke
- 1977 I'm Fine, How Are You with Airto Moreira
- 1977 Reach for It with George Duke
- 1977 Easy Living with Sonny Rollins
- 1976 Garden of Love Light with Narada Michael Walden
- 1978 Don't Let Go with George Duke
- 1978 Don't Ask My Neighbors with Raul de Souza
- 1979 Follow the Rainbow with George Duke
- 1979 Future Street with Pages
- 1980 Nielsen Pearson with Nielsen Pearson
- 1980 Rocks, Pebbles and Sand with Stanley Clarke
- 1981 Pages [1981] with Pages
- 1982 Dream On with George Duke
- 1983 Not the Boy Next Door with Peter Allen
- 1984 In London with Al Jarreau
- 1984 Live in London with Al Jarreau
- 1987 All In the Name of Love with Atlantic Starr
- 1988 Guitar Workshop: Tribute to with Otis Redding
- 1989 One Passion with Michael Paulo
- 1993 Art & Survival with Dianne Reeves
- 1994 L.A. with Hiroshima
- 1995 Piel Ajena with Eduardo Capetillo
- 1996 George Duke Greatest Hits with George Duke
- 1996 Is That the Way to Your Heart with Kazu Matsui
- 1998 A Song a Day
- 2000 When I Hold You in My Heart with Clay Mortensen
- 2000 Rare Collection with Jaco Pastorius
- 2001 Pages [2001] with Pages
- 2003 Punk Jazz: The Jaco Pastorius Anthology with Jaco Pastorius
- 2003 In Between the Heartaches with Phyllis Hyman
