= Pages (band) =

American pop musical group (1978–1981)

- Pages circa 1979; from left to right: Charles "Icarus" Johnson, Steve George, Jerry Manfredi, Richard Page and George Lawrence

Background information
- Origin: Los Angeles, California, U.S.
- Genres: Soft rock; pop rock
- Years active: 1978–1981
- Labels: Epic; Capitol
- Spinoffs: Mr. Mister
- Members: Richard Page; Steve George; Peter Leinheiser; Jerry Manfredi; Russ Battelene; John Lang; Charles "Icarus" Johnson; George Lawrence

Pages was an American band active during the late 1970s and the early 1980s. The band consisted of Richard Page and Steve George on vocals and keyboards supported by various studio musicians, some of whom from time to time were considered part of the band. Although Pages was highly regarded for its well-crafted pop and jazz-fusion sound, the group did not achieve commercial success, and disbanded after recording three studio albums. Pages is perhaps best known as the launching pad for the recording careers of Page and George, who later formed the band Mr. Mister who topped the charts during the mid-1980s with the hits "Broken Wings" and "Kyrie".

== Origins ==
Pages grew out of a long friendship between Richard Page and Steve George, dating back to their high school days in Phoenix, Arizona. After high school, the two occasionally played together in bands in Los Angeles and Las Vegas. For a time, Page relocated to San Diego to attend music school.

In 1977, emerging teen idol Andy Gibb, recently relocated in Los Angeles and as his first single, "I Just Want to Be Your Everything", was racing to the top of the charts, recruited Page and George to perform vocals and keyboards as part of his backing band along with Peter Leinheiser on lead guitar, Jerry Manfredi on bass, and Russ Battelene on drums.

Gibb toured with this group of musicians throughout 1977. Toward the end of the year, the group recorded a demo tape of original jazz-fusion material. This tape came to the attention of former Blood, Sweat & Tears drummer Bobby Colomby, who liked what he heard and signed the group, now called 'Pages', to Epic Records. The group also included Page's cousin John Lang. Although Lang could not play a musical instrument (he claimed he was tone deaf), he became Pages' chief lyricist.

== Career ==
Pages' eponymous debut album, released in October 1978, featured tracks ranging from light funk ("Clearly Kim"), calypso ("Love Dance") and driving rock ("Room at the Top") to smooth ballads ("This Is for the Girls", "I Get It from You") and instrumentals ("Interlude"). The album featured session musicians including Colomby, Philip Bailey (Earth, Wind & Fire), Steve Forman, Dave Grusin, Claudio Slon, Victor Feldman, and Michael Brecker. Although Page provided most of the lead vocals, George took the lead on "Let It Go" and "Listen for the Love". Colomby was quoted as saying that "Pages represents the mainstream of contemporary music. They utilize various elements and combine them into an original and tasty mixture that will appeal to all formats of radio." Despite Colomby's prediction, radio found it hard to place the group's sound. Neither Pages nor its single "If I Saw You Again" made the Billboard charts. The band embarked on a promotional tour in support of the album, which began at The Roxy in September 1978.

After the commercial failure of their debut album, Pages went back to the studio to record their 1979 follow-up, entitled Future Street. Charles "Icarus" Johnson replaced Leinheiser on guitar, and George Lawrence replaced Battelene on drums. According to Page, "Jerry, Steve, and myself were writing all the music but it just didn't sound right. Everybody knew it, but it was left unspoken for a long time because of that lingering bond. With Charles and George, everything went perfect for the first time. The potential was just staring us in the face." Once again produced by Colomby, the album blended the finely crafted overtones of the first album with a somewhat hard-edged pop-rock sound with progressive overtones. Additional musicians and artists on Future Street included Kenny Loggins (backing vocals and songwriting on "Who's Right Who's Wrong"), George Hawkins, Joey Trujillo, and Jai Winding. George took lead vocals on "Two People". Another detail is that the cover sleeve was designed by John Lang. The opening track, "I Do Believe in You", peaked at number 84 on the Billboard Hot 100 in December 1979.

Although Future Street displayed future commercial potential, the album failed to chart. Now down to a duo of Page and George (with long-time collaborator Lang still aboard as non-performing lyricist), the band switched to Capitol Records, and brought in producer Jay Graydon. The resulting album eponymous like their first album was released in March 1981. Two singles were released from the album, "You Need a Hero" and "Come on Home;" they were the only tracks produced by Bobby Colomby on the album. The players on this album consisted of Page (lead and background vocals, piano), George (backing vocals, keyboards, synthesizers, piano), Steve Khan and Charles Johnson (guitar), Neil Stubenhaus (bass), Ralph Humphrey, Jeff Porcaro, Vinnie Colaiuta, and Mike Baird (drums), Paulinho DaCosta (percussion), Tom Scott (saxophone), Jay Graydon (guitars, synthesizer programming, producer), and Al Jarreau (vocal flute). Despite this lineup of notable musicians, the album failed to chart.

With the commercial failure of yet a third album, Page and George decided to disband the group, returning to the session circuit as highly sought-after songwriters and backing vocalists. They recorded with well-known producers like David Foster and Quincy Jones. They performed on albums by Al Jarreau, Donna Summer, Chaka Khan, REO Speedwagon, Kenny Loggins, Pointer Sisters, Molly Hatchet, and Twisted Sister. Page and George also did the vocals for Village People, together with Chicago's Bill Champlin and Tom Kelly (songwriter of Madonna's hit "Like a Virgin"). Page was also part of the well-known back-up vocal trio who also included Kelly and Tommy Funderburk. By 1982, Page and George decided to form a more pop-oriented band with permanent members. As one-half of the four-piece band Mr. Mister, they would achieve commercial success with the number one singles "Broken Wings" and "Kyrie" in the mid-1980s.

== Covers of Pages songs ==
A number of artists have covered Pages songs:

Kenny Loggins recorded "Who's Right, Who's Wrong" on his 1979 album Keep the Fire, with Michael Jackson and Page providing backing vocals. The Four Tops also covered the song on their album Tonight! in 1981.

America recorded "I Do Believe in You" on their 1980 album, Alibi. Frank Stallone also covered the song on his self-titled debut album from 1984. Jorn Lande covered it on his 2020 album of cover tracks, Heavy Rock Radio II: Executing the Classics.

Herb Alpert recorded "I Get It from You" on his 1981 album, Magic Man. In 1979, Bobby Hutcherson covered "The Sailor's Song" as a vibraphone-driven instrumental on his Un Poco Loco album.

In 2011, multi-instrumentalist Zo! recorded a slow jam rendition of "Let It Go" on his EP ...Just Visiting Three with vocals by Nicholas Ryan Grant.

Also in 2011, electronic artist Vektroid released her album Floral Shoppe under the pseudonym Macintosh Plus, on which "If I Saw You Again" from Pages' first self-titled album and "You Need a Hero" from their second self-titled album are sampled.

Bassist Melvin Lee Davis covered "O.C.O.E" (Official Cat of the Eighties)" on his 2011 album Genre: Music.

== Discography ==
=== Studio albums ===
Year	Album	Peak position (Billboard 200)	Label
1978	Pages	—	Epic
1979	Future Street	—	Epic
1981	Pages	—	Capitol
"—" denotes releases that did not chart

=== Singles ===
Year	Single	Peak position (Hot 100)
1978	"If I Saw You Again"	—
1979	"I Do Believe in You"	84
1979	"Who's Right, Who's Wrong"	—
1981	"Come On Home"	—
1981	"You Need a Hero"	—
1983	"Caravan" (with Kitarō)	—
"—" denotes releases that did not chart
