= Zbigniew Rybczyński =

Polish film director

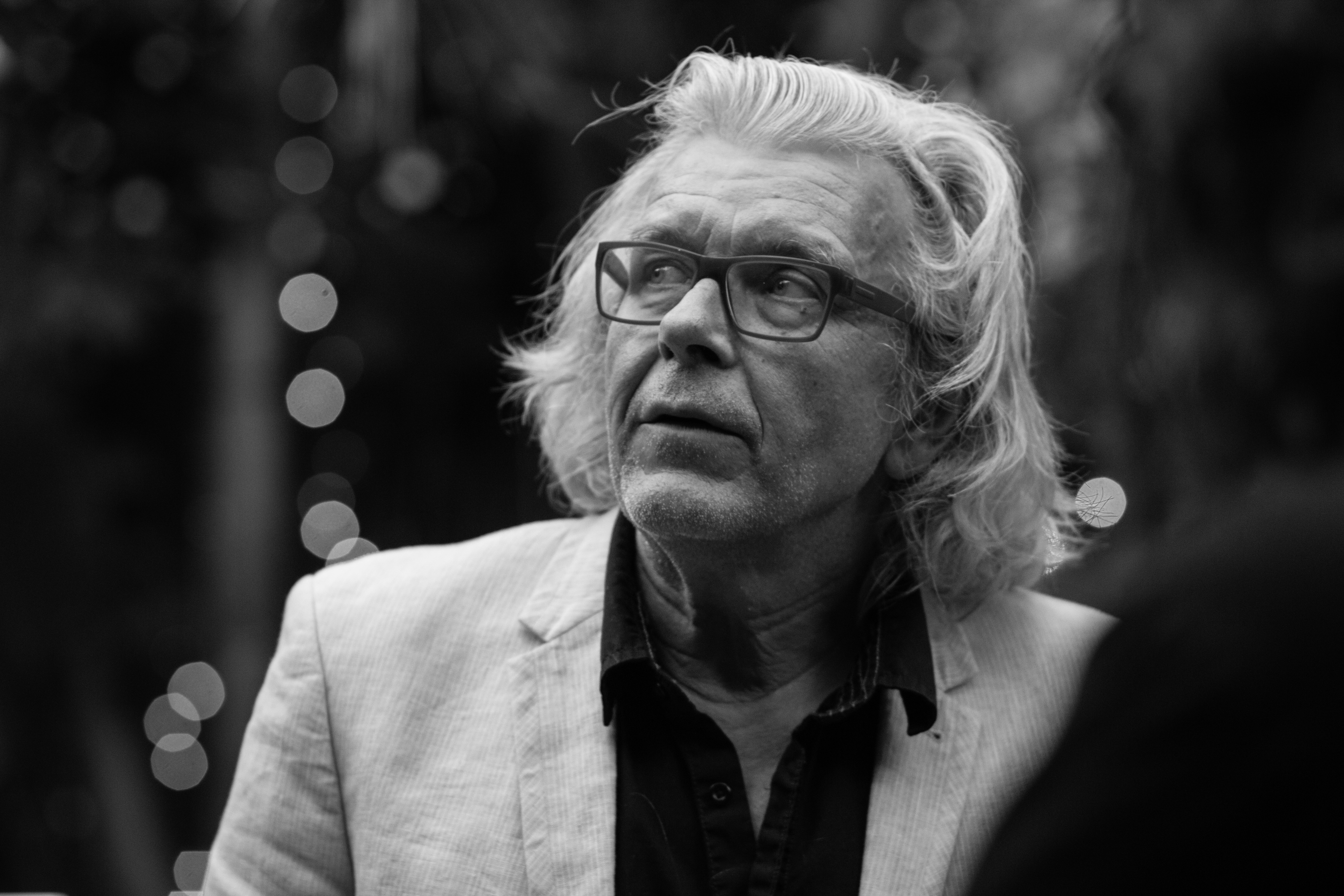
- Born: 27 January 1949 (age 77); Łódź, Poland
- Awards: Academy Award for Best Animated Short Film; 1982 Tango; Polish Film Festival; 1975 Zupa; Cannes Film Festival; 1987 Imagine

Zbigniew Rybczyński (Polish: [ˈzbiɡɲɛf rɨpˈt͡ʂɨj̃skʲi]; born 27 January 1949) is a Polish filmmaker, director, cinematographer, screenwriter, creator of experimental animated films, and multimedia artist who has won numerous prestigious industry awards both in the United States and internationally including the 1983 Academy Award for Best Animated Short Film for Tango.

He has taught cinematography and digital cinematography, and has worked as a researcher of blue and greenscreen compositing technology at Ultimatte Corporation. He is renowned for his innovative audiovisual techniques and for his pioneering experimentation in the field of new image technology.

In March 2009, Rybczyński returned to Poland. He took up residence in Wrocław, where he set up the Center for Audiovisual Technologies (CeTA) at the site of the city's historic Feature Film Studio. The center, which officially opened in January 2013, includes a state-of-the-art studio designed by Rybczyński for the production of multi-layer film images, and an institute for research into images and visual technologies.

After Rybczyński discovered and publicized corruption in CeTA, he was fired from the institution he founded and subsequently renounced his Polish citizenship in protest.

== Early life and career ==
Rybczyński was born in Łódź, Poland. He grew up in Warsaw, where he attended a secondary-level art school and then worked briefly at the |Studio Miniatur Filmowych (1968-1969). He studied cinematography at the Łódź Film School (1969-1973); his thesis films were Take Five and Plamuz. During his studies, he became a founding member of the Film Form Workshop (Warsztat Formy Filmowej), the most important Polish neo avant-garde group. He also honed his film-making skills working as a cinematographer for young directors like Andrzej Barański, Piotr Andrejew, Wojciech Wiszniewski, and Filip Bajon on shorts, documentaries and educational films, and on Grzegorz Królikiewicz's feature-length The Dancing Hawk (Tańczący Jastrząb). His films from the period include: The Talk (Rozmowa, TV) and Gropingly (Po Omacku) by Andrejew, Videocassette (Wideokaseta) by Bajon, and Wanda Gościmińska. Włókniarka by Wiszniewski. From 1973 to 1980, Rybczyński made his own films at the Se-Ma-For Studio in Łódź. He established the Dr. Stanzl special effects studio in Vienna for the Austrian public TV station ORF, and worked there from 1977 to 1980. During the political unrest in Poland in 1980, he was the head of the founders' committee of the Se-Ma-For studio branch of Solidarity.

== Emigration to the United States ==
In 1982, during the martial law period, he managed to arrange a job contract that enabled him to leave Poland for Vienna, where he applied for political asylum. The following year, he and his family emigrated to the US, where they lived in Los Angeles and then New York. The first works he made in the US were the short experimental videos "The Day Before" and "The Discreet Charm of the Diplomacy", both made in 1984 on a commission from NBC's The New Show. In 1985, he launched his own studio – ZBIG VISION – in New York, which he subsequently outfitted with the latest video, computer and HDTV technology. It was in this studio that he made his most important American films, including Steps (1987), The Fourth Dimension (1988), The Orchestra (1990), Manhattan (1991), and Kafka (1992), which were showered with enthusiastic critical acclaim and numerous awards. In the, US he also made short music-based pieces that added to his popularity and acclaim. Between 1984 and 1989, he made more than 30 music videos for such artists as Mick Jagger, Yoko Ono, Lou Reed, Simple Minds, Cameo, Art of Noise, Chuck Mangione, Pet Shop Boys, Lady Pank, The Alan Parsons Project, Supertramp, and Rush. One of them – "Imagine" (1986), made for John Lennon's composition – was the first music video ever made using high-definition technology.

In 1994, Rybczyński moved to Germany, where he co-founded the Centrum Für Neue Bildgestaltung, an experimental film center in Berlin, and later worked in Cologne. He returned to Los Angeles in 2001, where he worked for the Ultimatte Corporation and continued his research in the area where art, science, and digital technology intersect working out new standards for moving images. Among the results of Rybczyński's long-term research and experimentation are his inventions in the field of electronic-image technology, for which he holds several US patents, and which are widely used in the film and TV industries.

In March 2009, Rybczyński returned to Poland, taking up residence in Wrocław, where he set up the Center for Audiovisual Technologies (CeTa) at the site of the city's historic Feature Film Studio. The center, which officially opened in January 2013, includes a state-of-the-art studio designed by Rybczyński for the production of multi-layer film images, and an institute for research into images and visual technologies.

Rybczyński was a professor at the Academy of Media Arts Cologne (1998-2001), and has also taught at many other art and film schools, including the National Film School in Łódź, Columbia University in New York, and Yoshiba University of Art and Design in Tokyo.

In 2014, Rybczyński settled on a two acre ranch near Tucson, Arizona. Together with his wife, Dorota Zglobicka who is also a filmmaker, Zbig created Gila Monster Studios. Currently, they are in pre-production for their upcoming feature film, The Designer.

== Awards ==
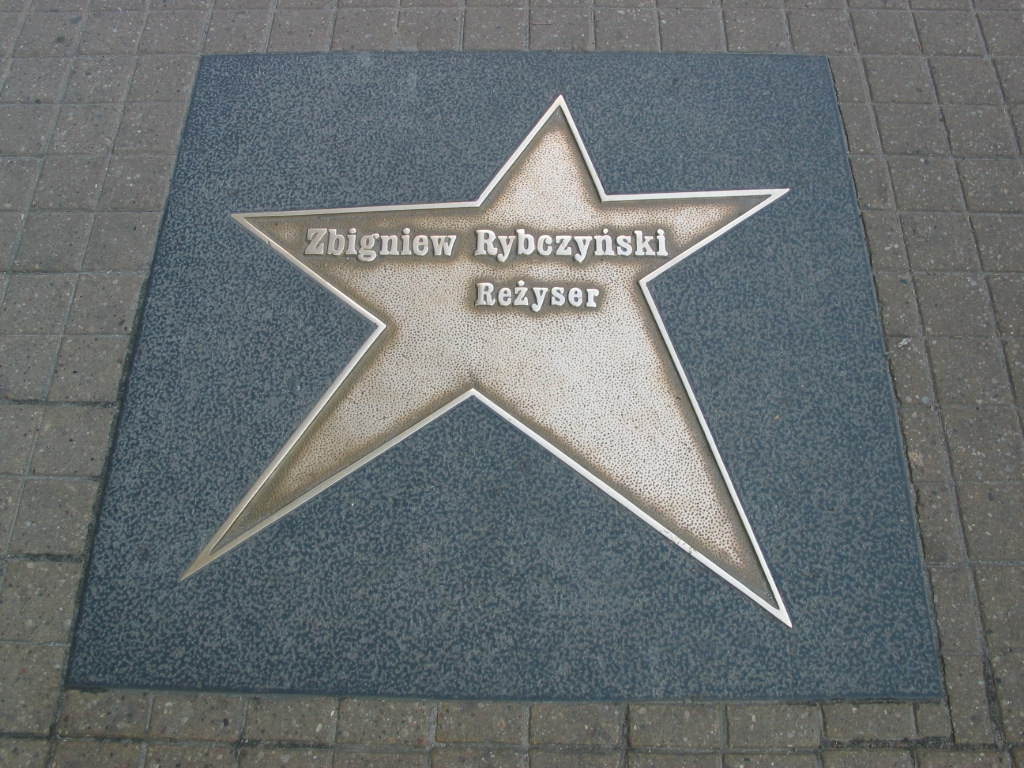
star on the Łódż walk of fame

Rybczyński has won numerous prestigious awards at international film festivals including Oberhausen (1981), Tampere (1982), Kraków (1981), and the Golden Gate Award at the San Francisco International Film Festival (1993). He won the Academy Award for Best Animated Short Film in 1983 for his film Tango, the first-ever Oscar awarded to a Polish artist. (The awards ceremony was notable for Rybczyński, as after he left the ceremony to step outside for a smoke, he was barred entry by a security guard even though he was holding an Oscar statuette. A scuffle ensued, and Rybczyński was arrested. His summation of the event was that "success and failure are quite intertwined.")

He has also received three MTV Video Music Awards, three American Video Awards, three Monitor Awards (1984-1987), an MTV Video Vanguard Award for "being visionary in the field of music video" (1985–86), a Billboard Music Video Award (1986), a Silver Lion at the Cannes Advertising Film Festival (1987), an Emmy Award (1990), a Prix Italia (1990), and the Grand Prize at the International Electronic Cinema Festival, Tokyo-Montreux (1990 and 1992). In 2010, he received a Lifetime Achievement Award for his contributions to the development of international cinematic art at the Batumi International Art-House Film Festival (BIAFF) in Georgia.

In 1999, Rybczyński was honored with a star in the Łódź Walk of Fame. In 2008, the Łódź Film School awarded him an honorary doctorate "for outstanding artistic skill and innovation in the cinematic arts and for the creative use of the potentials of art, technology and science". In the same year, Poland's Minister of Culture and National Heritage awarded him the Medal for Merit to Culture – Gloria Artis for Cultural Achievements, and he also received the prestigious Katarzyna Kobro Award for artistic achievement.

Rybczyński's first solo exhibition – "A Treatise on the Visual Image", shown in 2009 at Art Stations in Poznań, the WRO Art Center in Wrocław, and the Center of Contemporary Art Znaki Czasu in Toruń – focused attention on his unique artistic and scientific achievements, presenting his work in the context not only of film, but of contemporary fine arts.

Rybczyński was also active in an avant-garde group "Warsztat Formy Filmowej", and had cooperated with Se-Ma-For Studios in Łódź, where he authored a series of short films, including: Plamuz (1973), Zupa (1974) and Nowa książka (1975).

After winning the Academy Award for Tango, Rybczyński moved to New York and embarked on a career directing music videos in the early years of MTV. Rybczyński created dozens of music videos for artists including Art of Noise, Mick Jagger, Simple Minds, Pet Shop Boys, Chuck Mangione, The Alan Parsons Project, Yoko Ono, Lou Reed, Supertramp, Rush, Propaganda, and Lady Pank. His clip for John Lennon's Imagine was created as a showpiece for HDTV technology. Rybczyński won several MTV Awards, including the coveted Video Vanguard Award for his radical contributions to the form.

Rybczyński is a recognized pioneer in HDTV technology. In 1990, he produced the HDTV program The Orchestra for the Japanese market. This suite of classical music videos won many awards (including the Primetime Emmy Award for Outstanding Special Visual Effects). The program, created in HDTV, was broadcast in standard resolution by PBS as part of their Great Performances series in the US, as HDTV was not widely available to viewers until a decade later. Segments of this program are regularly featured on the Classic Arts Showcase channel in the U.S.

Frustrated with the quality of available chroma key technology — the process of removing a specific color frequency from film and video that had become essential to his work — Rybczyński began to author his own chromakey software in the 1990s. This led to an R&D position with the Los Angeles Ultimatte Corporation, longtime industry leaders in chromakey technology.

== Filmography ==
=== Poland period ===
Year	Film title	Duration	Film Type	Shoot Location
1972	Kwadrat (Square)	4:40	35 mm short film	PWSFTviT Łódź, Poland
1972	Take Five	3:36	35 mm short film	PWSFTviT Łódź, Poland
1973	Plamuz (Music Art)	9:38	35 mm short film	SMFF Se-Ma-For Łódź, Poland
1974	Zupa (Soup)	8:22	35 mm short film	SMFF Se-Ma-For Łódź, Poland
1975	Nowa Książka (New Book)	10:26	35 mm short film	SMFF Se-Ma-For Łódź, Poland
1975	Lokomotywa (Locomotive)	9:38	35 mm short film	SMFF Se-Ma-For Łódź, Poland
1975	Święto (Holiday)	9:38	35 mm short film	SMFF Se-Ma-For Łódź, Poland
1976	Oj! Nie Mogę Się Zatrzymać! (Oh, I Can't Stop!)	10:07	35 mm short film	SMFF Se-Ma-For Łódź, Poland
1976	Weg Zum Nachbarn (Way To Your Neighbor)	2:30	35 mm short film	SMFF Se-Ma-For Łódź, Poland
1977	Piątek - Sobota (Friday - Saturday)	3:00	35 mm short film	SMFF Se-Ma-For Łódź, Poland
1979	Mein Fenster (My Window)	2:26	35 mm short film	Vienna
1980	Tango	8:14	35 mm short film	SMFF Se-Ma-For Łódź, Poland
1980	Media	1:36	35 mm short film	SMFF Se-Ma-For Łódź, Poland
1980	Sceny Narciarskie z Franzem Klammeren (Ski Scenes with Franz Klammer)	9:38	35 mm documentary film	in collaboration with B. Dziworski, WFO Łódź, Poland and Signal Film, Vienna
1981	Wdech-Wydech (Inhale-Exhale)	2:26	35 mm short film	in collaboration with B. Dziworski, SMFF Se-Ma-For Łódź, for TVP, Poland

=== Later works ===
==== 1983 ====
- Angst - Austrian serial killer film starring Erwin Leder

==== 1984 ====
- "Sign of the Times" - music video for Grandmaster Flash from They Said It Couldn't Be Done, 4:25, Elektra/Asylum Records
- "The Real End" - music video for Rickie Lee Jones from The Magazine, 4:47, Warner Bros.
- "All That I Wanted" - music video for Belfegore from their eponymous album, 4:15, Elektra Records
- "Diana D" - music video for Chuck Mangione, 4 min, CBS Records
- "Close (to the Edit)" - music video for Art of Noise, 4:30, Island Records
- "The Discreet Charm of the Diplomacy" - experimental short video, 2:56, The New Show NBC TV
- "The Day Before" - experimental short video, 1:38, The New Show NBC TV

==== 1985 ====
- "Lose Your Love" - music video for Blancmange, 3:54, Warner Bros.
- "Alive and Kicking" - music video for Simple Minds, 5:25, A&M Records
- "Ultimo Ballo (The Last Dance)" - music video for Angel / Maimone Entreprise, 4:50, Virgin Records
- "Midnight Mover" - music video for Accept, 3:10, Epic Records
- "Minus Zero" - music video for Lady Pank, 3:55, MCA Records
- "She Went Pop" - music video for I Am Siam, 4:10, Columbia Records
- "Hot Shot" - music video for Jimmy Cliff, 3:55, CBS Records
- "p:Machinery" - music video for Propaganda, 3:45, Island Records
- "Who Do You Love" - music video for Bernard Wright, 4:15, Capitol Records

==== 1986 ====
- "Imagine" - experimental HDTV film, 4:20, music by John Lennon, Rebo/Rybczynski Productions
- "Candy" - HDTV music video for Cameo, 4:20, Polygram Records, Rebo Productions
- "The Original Wrapper" - music video for Lou Reed, 4:40, RCA Records
- "I Can't Think About Dancing" - music video for Missing Persons, 4 min, Capitol Records
- "Sex Machine" - music video for Fat Boys, 4 min, Tin Pan Apple/Sutra Records
- "All the Things She Said" - music video for Simple Minds, 4:15, Virgin Records
- "Hell in Paradise" - music video for Yoko Ono, 3:30, OnoVideo/Polygram Records
- "Stereotomy" - music video for The Alan Parsons Project, 4:10, Arista Records
- "OPPORTUNITIES" - music video for Pet Shop Boys, 3:40, EMI Records

==== 1987 ====
- "Let's Work" - HDTV music video for Mick Jagger, 4:05, CBS Records
- "Why Should I Cry?" - HDTV music video for Nona Hendryx, 4 min, EMI Records, Rebo Productions
- "Keep Your Eye On Me" - HDTV music video for Herb Alpert, 5:15, A&M RECORDS, Rebo Productions
- Steps - experimental video/35mm film, 26 min, Zbig Vision, KCTA-TV (PBS), Channel Four
- "I'm Beggin' You" - music video for Supertramp, 4 min, A&M Records
- "Time Stand Still" - music video for Rush, 3:30, Polygram Records
- "Something Real" - music video for Mr. Mister, 4:10, BMG Music
- "Dragnet 1987" - music video for Art of Noise, 3 min, Chrysalis Records

==== 1988 ====
- Fluff - opening sequence video, 1:47, HDTV, RAI
- The Duel - a tribute to G.Melies, 4:08, HDTV, Telegraph
- Blue Like You - HDTV music video for Étienne Daho, 3:41, Virgin Records
- The Fourth Dimension - experimental 35 mm film, 27 min, Zbig Vision, Rai 3, Canal+, and KTCA-TV (PBS)

==== 1989 ====
- Capriccio no.24 - experimental HDTV film, 6:18, TVE's The Art of Video
- You Better Dance - HDTV music video for The Jets, 3:34, MCA Records
- Cowbell - HDTV music video for Takeshi Itoh, 4 min, CBS Records
- GMF Groupe - promo, 2:03, HDTV, Zbig Vision and Ex Nihilo

==== 1990 ====
- The Orchestra - HDTV long film, 57:11, Zbig Vision and Ex Nihilo, coproduced by NHK, Canal+, and PBS Great Performances.
- Video Hits One - 17 network IDs for VH1

==== 1991 ====
- Manhattan - experimental HDTV film, 28 min, Zbig Vision and NHK Enterprises USA, Inc.
- Washington - experimental HDTV film, 28 min, Zbig Vision and NHK Enterprises USA, Inc.

==== 1992 ====
- Kafka - HDTV long film, 52:16, Télémax, Les Editions Audiovisuelles
- Curtains - opening sequence for Tonight Show, 0:34, HDTV, NBC TV

==== 2004 ====
- Une odyssée Tunisian movie

==== 2011 ====
- The Vision, 2011, co-director Dorota Zgłobicka, Zbig Vision, Polska

== See also ==
- List of Poles
- Cinema of Poland
- List of Polish Academy Award winners and nominees
