= Belfegore =

German band

Belfegore was a short-lived German gothic new wave band, formed in the early 1980s by Meikel Clauss. The group released several singles and two albums, initially for the German independent record label Pure Freude and later for Elektra Records. Belfegore are probably best known now for the US college radio hit "All That I Wanted", the video to which aired on MTV, VH1 and USA Network.

== History ==
Belfegore was a project and brainchild of the German singer and guitarist Michael (Meikel) David Clauss, formerly of Nichts and Der KFC, with Manfred "Charly" Terstappen (a.k.a. Charly T Charles) and Walter Jaeger, formerly with Die Krupps. The band was formed 1982 in Düsseldorf and quickly became part of the Neue Deutsche Welle (German New Wave) movement, playing a distinctly German style of new wave music that owed a lot to both the early UK goth scene as well as the European punk movement.

Their first album, A Dog Is Born was a mostly self-financed affair, gaining limited release in Germany through Pure Freude and imported into the UK by Rough Trade Records. This release was followed by the self-titled 12" EP Belfegore and the 7" live single "Marmor". In 1983, just as the group signed a record deal with Elektra, Jaeger left the band and was replaced by Raoul Walton. The resultant album, Belfegore, produced by Conny Plank and released with two different cover versions, saw a shift away from the more experimental new wave sound to something harder-edged.

The band supported U2 on the European part of the Unforgettable Fire Tour. In 1985, Clauss dissolved the band because he claimed he had had enough of the rock and roll lifestyle and he went on to study medicine in Germany. Raoul Walton later played with the German rock band Anyone's Daughter. In 1988, Charly Terstappen joined The Lords, one of Germany's longest-serving rock bands.

The video for "All That I Wanted", which was directed by Academy Award-winning director Zbigniew Rybczyński in one of his first forays into music video (he also directed promos for Art of Noise and Propaganda), was also aired on MuchMusic in Canada, to much acclaim.

On 30 September 2011, the band (Clauss/Walton/Terstappen) played a one-off reunion gig at 'Ratinger Hof' in Düsseldorf.

In 2011, acclaimed director David Fincher used "All That I Wanted" off of their second album in his adaption of Stieg Larsson's worldwide bestseller, The Girl with the Dragon Tattoo, the first novel in the Millennium series. It was featured in the background during a scene when the titular character, Lisbeth Salander, is hacking Mikael Blomkvist's computer and does background checks on Dirch Frode and Hans-Erik Wennerström. The latter becomes an important part of the plot in the series as the story progresses.

== Members ==
- Meikel Clauss - vocals/guitar/electronics
- Manfred Terstappen ("Charly T. Charles") - drums/backing vocals
- Raoul Walton - bass/backing vocals
- Walter Jaeger - synth/bass

== Discography ==
=== Albums ===
- A Dog Is Born - 1983 Pure Freude
- Belfegore - 1984 Elektra

=== Singles ===
- "Belfegore"/"Nacht in Sodom"/"Heilige Kriege" - 1983 Pure Freude
- "Belfegore in Roma: Marmor"/"Herz Atmet Echos" - 1984 Pure Freude
- "All That I Wanted" (Remix)/"All That I Wanted" (Single Version) - 1984 Elektra
- "All That I Wanted" (Extended Club Mix)/"Wake Up With Sirens" (Remix)/"Seabird Seamoan" (Remix) - 1984 Elektra
