= Third Matinee =

American rock band

Third Matinee (or 3rd Matinee) was an American rock band formed by vocalist and bassist Richard Page with keyboardist Patrick Leonard. The group formed after the breakup of Page's band, Mr. Mister, and the demise of Leonard's band, Toy Matinee. Third Matinee released one album, Meanwhile (1994), a progressive-pop rock album, through Warner Bros Records.

== Discography ==
All tracks are written by Patrick Leonard and Richard Page, except where noted.

Meanwhile (April 26, 1994) (Warner Bros / WEA)
No.	Title	Writer(s)	Length
1.	"I Don't Care"		4:31
2.	"Freedom Road"	Leonard, Page, Nick Laird-Clowes	4:55
3.	"Holiday for Sweet Louise"		4:50
4.	"She Dreams"	Leonard, Page, Laird-Clowes	6:01
5.	"Ordinary Day"		4:18
6.	"Family Tree"		4:43
7.	"Echo Hill"		4:16
8.	"All the Way Home"	Leonard, Page, Laird-Clowes	5:13
9.	"Silver Cage"		2:38
10.	"Trust Somebody"	Leonard, Page, Marc Jordan	4:36
11.	"Meanwhile"		4:52
Total length:			50:53

== Personnel ==
3rd Matinee

- Patrick Leonard – keyboards, backing vocals
- Richard Page – lead vocals, backing vocals, guitars, drums

Additional musicians

- Steve Porcaro – synthesizers (4)
- James Harrah – guitars (1–4, 6–9, 11)
- Marc Bonilla – guitars (5)
- Guy Pratt – bass guitar (1–3, 5–7, 10, 11)
- Brian MacLeod – drums (1–4, 6–8, 10, 11)
- Luis Conte – percussion (2, 4, 9–11), drum programming (9)
- Vinnie Colaiuta – drum programming (9)
- Jerry Jordan – backing vocals (2, 5)
- Nick Laird-Clowes – backing vocals (2)
- Valerie Pinkston-Mayo – backing vocals (3)
- Dorian Holley – backing vocals (6, 10, 11)
- Julie Delgado – backing vocals (10, 11)

=== Production ===
- Michael Ostin – executive producer
- Patrick Leonard – producer
- Richard Page – co-producer
- Jerry Jordan – recorded, mixing
- Marc Moreau – additional engineer, digital editing
- Johnny Yuma Recording (Burbank, California) – recording and mixing location
- Doug Sax – mastering at The Mastering Lab (Hollywood, California)
- Marcia Asuncion – production coordinator
- Jeri Heiden – art direction, design
- Mark Ryden – illustration
- Michael Wilson – photography
- Larimie Garcia – hand lettering
- The Fitzgerald Hartley Co. – management for Patrick Leonard
- George Ghiz for Mogul Entertainment Group – management for Richard Page
