= Tango (1981 film) =

- Directed by: Zbigniew Rybczyński
- Written by: Zbigniew Rybczyński
- Produced by: Zygmunt Smyczek
- Cinematography: Zbigniew Rybczyński
- Edited by: Barbara Sarnocinska
- Music by: Janusz Hajdun
- Production companies: Film Polski; Studio Se-Ma-For
- Release date: 1981
- Running time: 8 minutes
- Country: Poland

Tango is a 1981 Polish animated short film written and directed by Zbigniew Rybczyński. It won the Academy Award for Best Animated Short Film at the 55th Academy Awards. It required several hundred thousand exposures on an optical printer and sixteen hours a day over seven months to make the short.

== Summary ==
The film depicts an initially empty room. A ball bounces in through the window, and a boy enters to retrieve it and leaves. This series of actions repeats over and over, gradually accompanied by more and more repeating paths of different people through the room. The film ends with the people eventually leaving the room and the boy throws the ball through the window one last time, landing near an old woman lying down. She then gets up, picks up the ball and walks out the door near her, leaving the room completely empty again just like at the beginning.

== Accolades ==
- Academy Award for Best Animated Short Film

== See also ==
- Independent animation
- Cinema of Poland
- 1981 in film
