= Lose Your Love =

Single by Blancmange

from the album Believe You Me
- B-side: "John"
- Released: 28 October 1985
- Recorded: 1985
- Genre: Synth-pop
- Length: 3:58
- Label: London; Sire (US)
- Songwriters: Neil Arthur; Stephen Luscombe
- Producer: Stewart Levine

Blancmange singles chronology
"What's Your Problem" (1985)	"Lose Your Love" (1985)	"I Can See It" (1986)

Alternative cover
- Canadian cover of "Lose Your Love"

"Lose Your Love" is a song by the English synth-pop duo Blancmange, released on 28 October 1985 as the second single from their third studio album, Believe You Me (1985). It was written by Neil Arthur and Stephen Luscombe, and produced by Stewart Levine. "Lose Your Love" reached No. 77 in the UK, which was the duo's first single to fail to reach the Top 40 since 1982's "Feel Me". In the United States, it was a dance hit, reaching No. 2 on the Billboard Dance/Club Play Songs Chart.

== Release ==
For its release as a single, "Lose Your Love" was remixed. The B-side, "John", also appeared on Believe You Me (1985). The single was released in the UK, Canada, Japan and Europe by London Records, while it was released in America through Sire Records. In the UK only, a special double 7" vinyl gatefold release was issued. The bonus 7" vinyl featured an extended remix of the duo's 1983 hit single "That's Love, That It Is" and "Game Above My Head (Extended Remix)".

For 12" editions of the single, an extended version of "Lose Your Love" was created, along with "Mixing on the Ceiling", a 10 minute medley of various Blancmange songs. In the US, the 12" vinyl release featured the extended version of "Lose Your Love", while the B-side was an extended version of the West India Company track "Ave Maria", featuring Vince Clarke as guest musician on pyrotechnics. "Ave Maria (Om Ganesha)" was originally released as West India Company's debut single in 1984.

== Music video ==
The song's music video was directed by Zbigniew Rybczyński. On its release, it was banned by both UK broadcasting companies BBC and ITV due to violence. In the US, it achieved light rotation on MTV. The music video appeared in the 1986 Disney sci-fi film Flight of the Navigator.

In a 2011 interview, Arthur recalled the video: "We had great fun making the video for that, many years ago. We flew over to New York to film it. The video got banned by ITV and the BBC for 'inciting violence in the home'. Because we were smashing up things. It was ridiculous. We hired an old, abandoned terminal in Manhattan – each room was a different scenario. And then we went upstate and pulled a house down for the finale! An old house was going to be demolished and we filmed it being pulled down."

== Critical reception ==
Upon its release, Mike Mitchell of Record Mirror called "Lose Your Love" a "tuneful ditty" and a "good choice for the singles market". Dave Ling of Number One praised it as "an emphatic addition to their list of triumphs, boasting an odd two-fingered twiddly keyboard arrangement and a chorus of truly immense proportions". A reviewer for the Fife Free Press remarked that the "hooky" song "should effortlessly chalk up another big seller" for Blancmange. Paul Screeton of the Hartlepool Mail commented, "This is Blancmange's strongest offering this year after, I felt, they had been losing their way a bit." He noted Arthur's "fine voice" and that the duo's "characteristic" sound remained intact, predicting the song will "certainly [reach] the top ten".

John Lee, writing for the Huddersfield Daily Examiner, considered it to be a "slight improvement" on the duo's previous single, "What's Your Problem". He continued, "It has a stronger edge and, though by no means a chart certainty, it should gain some commercial recognition." Simon Mares of the Reading Evening Post felt it was "not quite as much fun as most of their tunes", but still "good stuff to bop along to on the car stereo". In the US, Billboard wrote, "Seminal British synthpop duo unevils one of its infrequent singles, sounding a good deal mellower and more relaxed than in its 'Living on the Ceiling' days." The magazine also noted about the 12-inch remix: "The epic-length remix suggests that a new, artier form of high-energy may be emerging..."

In a review of the 2017 deluxe edition of Believe You Me (1985), Paul Scott-Bates of Louder Than War described the song as an "immediate singalong track with a wall of sound and a toe-tapping chorus that is difficult to shake". The Electricity Club commented the song was "certainly one of the more punchy moments on the album". John Leland at Spin said it was, "smart synthesized DOR: clever instrumentation, sharp mix, and a relentless beat. It's also exhaustingly dull."

== Track listing ==
7" single

1. "Lose Your Love" – 3:58
2. "John" – 4:12

7" single (US promo)

1. "Lose Your Love (Edit)" – 3:59
2. "Lose Your Love (LP Version)" – 3:56

2x 7" single (UK gatefold release)

1. "Lose Your Love" – 4:07
2. "John" – 4:17
3. "That's Love, That It Is" – 7:30
4. "Game Above My Head (Extended Remix) " – 7:06

12" single (UK release)

1. "Lose Your Love (Extended Version)" – 10:12
2. "John" – 4:17
3. "Mixing on the Ceiling" – 10:38

12" single (UK promo)

1. "Lose Your Love (Extended Version)" – 10:11
2. "John" – 4:17
3. "Mixing on the Ceiling" – 10:39

12" single (US release)

1. "Lose Your Love (Extended Version)" – 10:05
2. "Ave Maria (Extended Version)" (West India Company) – 7:30

12" single (French release)

1. "(No, No, No) Lose Your Love (Extended Version)" – 10:12
2. "John" – 4:12
3. "Mixing on the Ceiling (Megamix)" – 10:35

12" single (German release)

1. "Lose Your Love (Extended Version)" – 10:12
2. "Mixing on the Ceiling" – 10:35

12" single (Canadian promo #1)

1. "Lose Your Love" – 3:58
2. "Lose Your Love" – 3:58

12" single (Canadian promo #2)

1. "Lose Your Love (This Club Mix)" – 6:45
2. "Lose Your Love" – 3:58

== Personnel ==
Blancmange

- Neil Arthur – lead vocals
- Stephen Luscombe – keyboards, synthesizers, producer of "John"

Additional personnel

- David Rhodes – guitar
- Katie Kissoon, Stevie Lange – backing vocals
- Justin Hildreth – drums
- Stewart Levine – producer of "Lose Your Love"
- John Luongo – mixer, editor, remixer

== Charts ==
Chart (1985–86)	Peak position
UK Singles Chart	77
US Billboard Dance/Club Play Songs	2
US Billboard Hot Dance Music/Maxi-Singles Sales	36
