= Hunters of the Night (song) =

Single by Mr. Mister

from the album I Wear the Face
- B-side: "I Get Lost Sometimes"
- Released: February 1984 (US)
- Recorded: 1983
- Genre: Pop rock
- Length: 5:07
- Label: RCA
- Songwriters: Richard Page; Steve George; John Lang; George Ghiz
- Producers: Mr. Mister; Peter Mclan

Mr. Mister singles chronology
"Talk the Talk" (1984)	"Hunters of the Night" (1984)	"Broken Wings" (1985)

"Hunters of the Night" is a song by American rock band Mr. Mister, released as their first single via RCA Records in February 1984. It was included as the lead track on their 1984 debut album, I Wear the Face.

== Background and music ==
The power ballad was written by bassist Richard Page and keyboardist Steve George. It was co-written with lyricist John Lang and George Ghiz, who was the band's manager at the time. The single was released in 1984 along with a music video. The early exposure lead to a chart peak of number 57 on the Billboard Hot 100 and buoyed the success of their follow-up album, Welcome to the Real World.

== Track listing ==
7" single

1. "Hunters of the Night" (radio edit) – 4:08
2. "I Get Lost Sometimes" – 3:50

== Charts ==
Chart (1984)	Peak position
US Billboard Hot 100	57
