= I Can See It =

Single by Blancmange

from the album Believe You Me
- B-side: "Scream Down the House"
- Released: 21 April 1986
- Studio: Eel Pie Studios (London)
- Genre: Synth-pop
- Length: 4:12
- Label: London
- Songwriters: Neil Arthur; Stephen Luscombe
- Producer: Greg Walsh

Blancmange singles chronology
| "Lose Your Love" (1985) | "I Can See It" (1986) | "Drive Me" (2011) |

Music video
- "I Can See It" on YouTube

"I Can See It" is a song by the English synth-pop duo Blancmange, released by London on 21 April 1986 as a non-album single. The song is a re-recorded version of "Why Don't They Leave Things Alone?", which appeared on the duo's third studio album Believe You Me (1985). It was written by Neil Arthur and Stephen Luscombe, and produced by Greg Walsh. "I Can See It" reached number 71 in the UK Singles Chart and remains the duo's last appearance in the chart. Shortly after the single's release, Blancmange decided to disband.

"I Can See It" was recorded at Eel Pie Studios in London, while the B-side, "Scream Down the House", was recorded at the Strongroom, London. The song's music video was directed by Gerald Casale of new wave band Devo.

== Critical reception ==
Upon its release, Ian Cranna of Smash Hits described "Why Don't They Leave Things Alone?" as the "best song on the disappointing Believe You Me" and said that as "I Can See It", the song had been "reworked into an absolute cracker". He added, "Blancmange are fairly hit-and-miss, mostly due to their healthy madness being channelled into rhythms rather than tunes - but this has the best of both worlds." Betty Page of Record Mirror commented, "Gently persuasive, but needs a few concentrated listens before its charms become apparent. The Neil Arthur here is nothing like the Neil Arthur we used to know and lurve from 'Living on the Ceiling' days."

Dave Ling of Number One felt the song was "stunningly average" and "hardly an obvious hit for Blancmange". He added, "This newie is quite an anonymous offering by comparison [to "Lose Your Love"]. In fact, without knowing who the artist was beforehand you'd be hard pushed to guess correctly." John Lee of the Huddersfield Daily Examiner described it as "fairly meritorious" but added that it "lacks the bite to change things for the better for this downward spiralling duo". Paul Benbow of the Reading Evening Post noted Walsh's "lavish production" but added that the "tedious vocals add up to hot air only used well to get a natty break from a trumpet". Neil Spencer of Sounds wrote, "A handy example of that authentic 1980s sound. As inspiring as a pair of curtains swishing open, only heard via an emulator and with a set of electronic drums farting along in the background."

In a review of the 2017 deluxe edition of Believe You Me (1985), Paul Scott-Bates of Louder Than War described the original version as a "medium paced tune about the state of the World". He praised the single version as "arguably the band's finest single" and added that the extended version was "nothing short of superb". The Electricity Club commented that the song was one of the album's "finer moments", adding that "the use of cello and flute lends the finished piece a quiet quality". In a retrospective review of Believe You Me, Bill Cassel of AllMusic described it as the "loveliest, saddest ballad Blancmange ever recorded".

== Track listing ==
7" single

1. "I Can See It" – 4:07
2. "Scream Down the House" – 4:08

12" single

1. "I Can See It (Extended)" – 7:58
2. "Scream Down the House" – 4:08

12" single (UK promo)

1. "I Can See It (Bonus Beats)" – 10:15
2. "Scream Down the House" – 4:08

== Personnel ==
Blancmange

- Neil Arthur – lead vocals, arranger on "I Can See It", producer of "Scream Down the House"
- Stephen Luscombe – keyboards, synthesizers

Additional personnel

- Greg Walsh – producer and arranger of "I Can See It"
- Brian Evans – engineer on "I Can See It"
- Phil Bodger – engineer on "Scream Down the House"
- Tony Bridge – mastering on "I Can See It"

Other

- Stylorouge – design
- Mick Brownfield – illustration

== Charts ==
| Chart (1986) | Peak position |
|---|---|
| UK Singles Chart | 71 |
