= Belfegore (album) =

Studio album by Belfegore
- Released: 1984
- Recorded: 1984
- Label: Elektra
- Producer: Conny Plank

Belfegore chronology
A Dog Is Born (1983)	Belfegore (1984)

Singles from Belfegore
- 1. "All That I Wanted" Released: 1984

Professional ratings
Review scores
Source	Rating
Allmusic	link

Belfegore was the second album by the German band Belfegore. This was Belfegore's first and last major studio release. Despite decent sales, the band split up one year later.

All lyrics are sung in English unlike their previous album. The album was available with two separate covers. It was released again on CD with several bonus tracks September 2013.

== Track listing ==
(all lyrics written by Meikel Clauss)

1. "All That I Wanted"
2. "Questions"
3. "Love"
4. "Wake Up With Sirens"
5. "Seabird, Seamoan"
6. "Don't You Run"
7. "Comic With Rats Now"
8. "Into The Dungeon"
9. "Belfegore"

== Personnel ==
- Meikel Clauss – vocals, guitar, electronics
- Charly T. Charles – drums, backing vocals
- Raoul Walton – bass, backing vocals
- Walter Jaeger – synth, bass
