= Nichts =

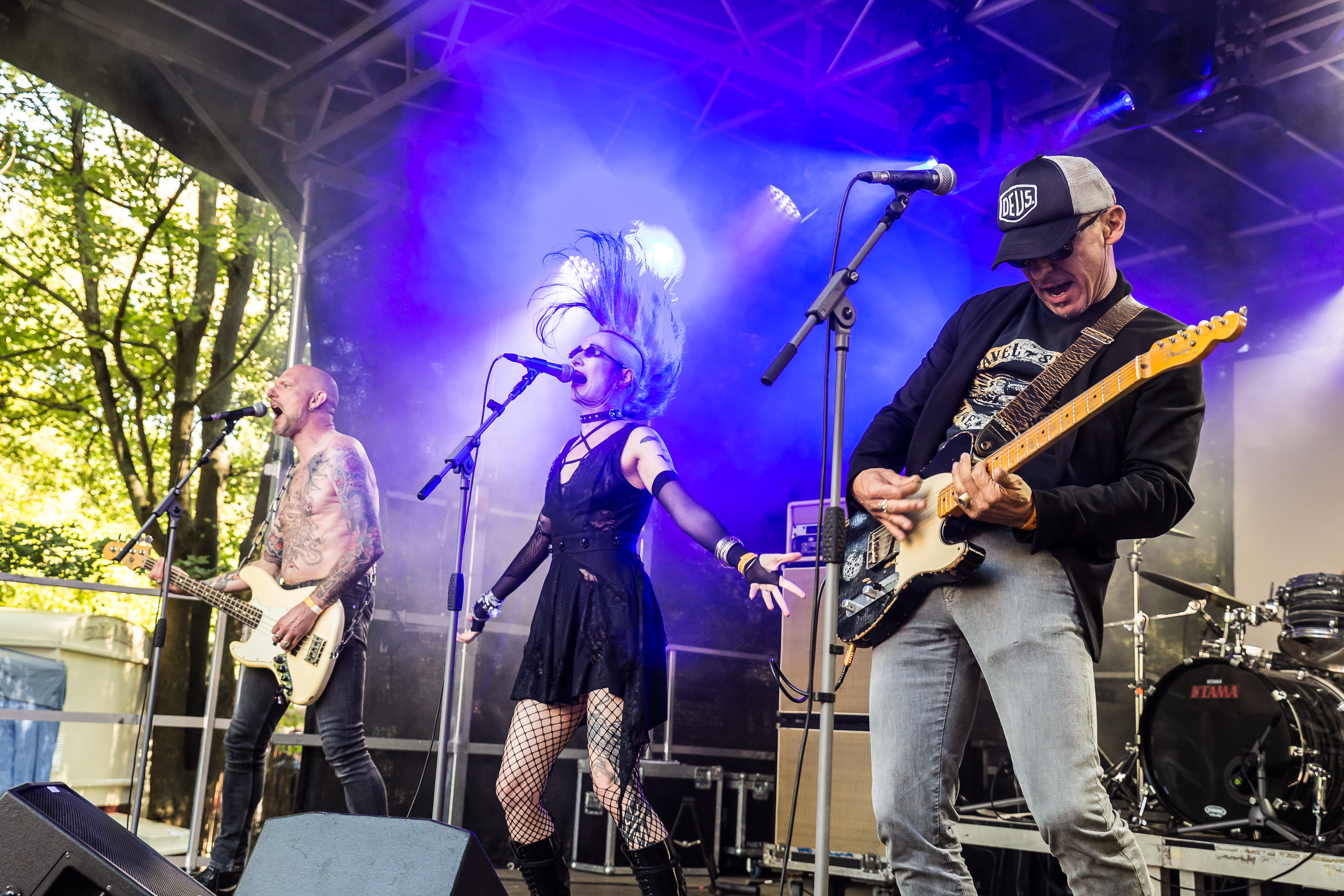

Background information
- Origin: Germany
- Genres: Neue Deutsche Welle, post-punk
- Years active: 1980–1983, 2009-present

Nichts (English: "nothing") is a German rock band from Düsseldorf that saw success with the Neue Deutsche Welle post-punk movement. Originally active from 1981 to 1983, it re-formed in 2009.

== History ==
The band formed in 1981 with Tobias Brink on drums, Michael Clauss on guitar, Andrea Mothes on vocals and Chris Scarbeck on bass. Brink and Clauss had previously played together in local punk band KFC.

They released their first LP Made in Eile ("Made in a hurry") in 1981 on independent record label Schallmauer Records. The sleeve listed the band members as "Micky Matschkopf", "Fritz Fotze", "Prunella Pustekuchen" and "Paul Popperkind", with Clauss and Brink using their pseudonyms whilst with KFC. The album track Radio became their first single.

Their second album Tango 2000 was released in 1982 and saw some commercial success. It included the singles Tango 2000 and Ein deutsches Lied ("A German Song").

In autumn 1982 Michael Clauss and bassist Chris Scarbeck left the band. For the third LP Aus Dem Jenseits ("From the other side"), released in 1983, they brought in two new musicians. The band split up in 1983.

Michael Clauss reformed Nichts with a new line-up to play concerts in Germany and Austria in 2009 and 2010. In 2011 they released an album entitled "Zeichen auf Sturm" (Signs of a storm).

== Discography ==
- Made in Eile (Schallmauer Records 1981)
- Tango 2000 (Schallmauer Records/WEA, 1982)
- Aus dem Jenseits (Schallmauer Records/WEA, 1983)
- Zeichen auf Sturm (Electrique Mud, 2011)
