= I Wear the Face =

Studio album by Mr. Mister
- Released: March 27, 1984
- Recorded: 1983
- Genre: Pop rock
- Length: 45:27
- Label: RCA Victor
- Producer: Peter McIan

Mr. Mister chronology
I Wear the Face (1984)	Welcome to the Real World (1985)

Alternative cover
- Cover for re-release

Singles from I Wear the Face
- 1. "Hunters of the Night" Released: February 1984; 2. "Talk the Talk" Released: June 1984

I Wear the Face is the debut studio album by American rock band Mr. Mister. It was released on March 27, 1984, by RCA Records. It reached #170 on the Billboard Top 200 chart. It was originally issued with a different cover photograph that was changed after the success of their second RCA album. The lead single from the album, "Hunters of the Night" reached a peak of #57 on the Billboard Hot 100 chart.

In 2016, the album was digitally remastered and released in Japan, using the original artwork.

== Track listing ==
All songs written by Richard Page, Steve George and John Lang except as noted:

1. "Hunters of the Night" (Page, George, Lang, George Ghiz) – 5:13
2. "Code of Love" – 4:34
3. "Partners in Crime" – 4:23
4. "32" – 4:41
5. "Runaway" – 4:15
6. "Talk the Talk" – 4:27
7. "I'll Let You Drive" – 4:10
8. "I Get Lost Sometimes" – 3:55
9. "I Wear the Face" – 4:56
10. "Life Goes On" (Page, George, Lang, Pat Mastelotto) – 5:15

== Personnel ==
Mr. Mister

- Richard Page – lead vocals, bass guitar
- Steve George – keyboards, saxophone, backing vocals
- Steve Farris – guitars
- Pat Mastelotto – drums

Production

- Peter McIan – producer, engineer
- Ric Butz – recording
- Paul Ray – assistant engineer
- Stephen Marcussen – remastering
- Joe Stelmach – art direction
- Aaron Rapoport – cover photograph
- Rob Brown – inner sleeve photograph
