= Something Real (Inside Me/Inside You) =

Single by Mr. Mister

from the album Go On...
- B-side: "Bare My Soul"
- Released: August 1987
- Recorded: 1985
- Genre: Pop rock
- Length: 4:19
- Label: RCA
- Songwriters: Richard Page; Steve George; John Lang
- Producers: Mr. Mister; Kevin Killen

Mr. Mister singles chronology
"Black/White" (1986)	"Something Real (Inside Me/Inside You)" (1987)	"Healing Waters" (1987)

"Something Real" is a 1987 single by American pop rock band Mr. Mister and the first single from Go On.... The song hit No. 29 on the Billboard Hot 100 in 1987, making it their final top 40 hit in the United States. An earlier version of the song was featured on the soundtrack to the 1986 film, Youngblood.

== Track listing ==
7" single

1. "Something Real (Inside Me/Inside You)" – 4:19
2. "Bare My Soul" – 4:31

12" single

1. "Something Real (Inside Me/Inside You)" (rock dance mix) – 6:24
2. "Something Real (Inside Me/Inside You)" (instrumental) – 6:04
3. "Bare My Soul" – 4:31

== Charts ==
Chart (1987)	Peak position
Belgium (Ultratop 50 Flanders)	35
Canada Top Singles (RPM)	38
Italy Airplay (Music & Media)	10
US Billboard Hot 100	29
US Cash Box Top 100 Singles	33
US Mainstream Rock (Billboard)	27
