= Go On... =

1987 studio album by Mr. Mister

Studio album by Mr. Mister
- Released: September 8, 1987
- Studio: Village Recorder (Los Angeles)
- Genre: Pop rock
- Length: 55:51
- Label: RCA Victor
- Producers: Mr. Mister; Kevin Killen

Mr. Mister chronology
Welcome to the Real World (1985)	Go On... (1987)	Broken Wings: The Encore Collection (1999)

Singles from Go On...
- 1. "Something Real (Inside Me/Inside You)" Released: August 1987; 2. "Healing Waters" Released: November 1987; 3. "The Border" Released: November 1987; 4. "Stand and Deliver" Released: March 1988

Go On... is the third album by American pop rock band Mr. Mister, released on September 8, 1987, by RCA Records. It features a more serious tone than their previous album Welcome to the Real World, which was commercially successful. This album did not fare as well commercially and would become the last publicly released album by the band before they broke up in 1990.

== Reception ==
Professional ratings
Review scores
Source	Rating
AllMusic	2/5 stars

In their retrospective review, AllMusic contended that Go On... retained the same themes, stylistics, and quality of work as their previous releases, and that "[t]he only significant change was in record sales". They particularly praised the album's lyrics, commenting, "during the height of the materialistic '80s, Go On was an example of a band using its pop culture bully pulpit to suggest that the "greed is good" philosophy was leaving a spiritual vacuum in American culture."

== Track listing ==
=== CD ===
All songs by Richard Page, Steve George and John Lang except where noted:

1. "Stand and Deliver" – 5:33
2. "Healing Waters" – 5:07 (Note: Mistakenly printed as 5:45 on physical disc (CD).) (Page, George, Lang, Farris, Mastelotto)
3. "Dust" – 6:35
4. "Something Real (Inside Me/Inside You)" – 4:24
5. "The Tube" – 5:23
6. "Bare My Soul" – 4:32 (Page, George, Steve Farris)*
7. "Control" – 4:20
8. "Watching the World" – 4:25
9. "Power over Me" – 5:04
10. "Man of a Thousand Dances" – 4:51 (Page, George, Lang, Farris)
11. "The Border" – 5:42

Note:

* Track only available on CD and "Something Real" vinyl single.

=== LP/cassette ===
- Side one
1. "Stand and Deliver" – 5:33
2. "Healing Waters" – 5:07
3. "Dust" – 6:35
4. "Something Real (Inside Me/Inside You)" – 4:24
5. "The Tube" – 5:23
- Side two
1. "Control" – 4:20
2. "Watching the World" – 4:25
3. "Power over Me" – 5:04
4. "Man of a Thousand Dances" – 4:51
5. "The Border" – 5:42

== Personnel ==
Mr. Mister

- Richard Page – bass, vocals
- Steve George – keyboards, Synclavier, soprano saxophone, vocals
- Steve Farris – guitars
- Pat Mastelotto – drums

Additional personnel

- John Lang – lyrics
- Alex Acuña – percussion
- Lenny Castro – percussion
- Alan Estes – percussion
- Bill Champlin – backing vocals (track 10)
- Tamara Champlin – backing vocals (track 10)
- Phil Perry – backing vocals (track 10)
- The Stan Lee Revue – backing vocals (track 2)
- Carmen Twillie – backing vocals (track 10)

== Production ==
- Kevin Killen – producer, engineer, mixing
- Jimmy Hoyson – second engineer
- Bob Ludwig – mastering at Masterdisk (New York City)
- Jonathan Owen MA (RCA) – cover illustration
- Ria Lewerke – art direction
- Norman Moore – art direction, design
- Tracy Veal – design
- Reed Anderson – liner photography
- Georg Kushner – sleeve photography
- Susan Gilman – production coordinator
- Sherry Rettig – production coordinator

== Charts ==
Chart performance for Go On...
Chart (1987)	Peak position
Australian Albums (Australian Music Report)	67
Canada Top Albums/CDs (RPM)	36
Dutch Albums (Album Top 100)	39
European Albums (Music & Media)	37
Finnish Albums (Suomen virallinen lista)	31
German Albums (Offizielle Top 100)	52
Norwegian Albums (VG-lista)	13
Swedish Albums (Sverigetopplistan)	9
Swiss Albums (Schweizer Hitparade)	15
US Billboard 200	55

== Certifications ==
Certifications for Go On...
Region	Certification	Certified units/sales
Canada (Music Canada)	Gold	50,000^{^}
^{^} Shipments figures based on certification alone.
