= Is It Love (Mr. Mister song) =

- US picture sleeve

Single by Mr. Mister

from the album Welcome to the Real World
- B-side: "Broken Wings"
- Released: March 1986 (US)
- Genre: Pop rock
- Length: 3:35
- Label: RCA
- Songwriters: Richard Page; Steve George; John Lang; Pat Mastelotto
- Producers: Mr. Mister; Paul De Villiers

Mr. Mister singles chronology
"Kyrie" (1985)	"Is It Love" (1986)	"Black/White" (1986)

"Is It Love" is a 1986 single by the band Mr. Mister and the third released from Welcome to the Real World. The song peaked at number 8 on the Billboard Hot 100 in June 1986, being their last major hit in charts. The song is used during the end credits of the 1987 film Stakeout.

Cash Box said that the song "has Mr. Mister's distinctive production sheen and the chorus will eventually catch the mass ear."

== Track listing ==
7" single

1. "Is It Love" – 3:32
2. "32" – 4:37

12" single

1. "Is It Love" (dance mix) – 6:24
2. "Broken Wings" – 5:45
3. "Is It Love" (dub mix) – 4:12

== Charts ==
Chart performance for "Is It Love"
Chart (1986)	Peak position
Belgium (Ultratop 50 Flanders)	29
Canada Top Singles (RPM)	20
Netherlands (Dutch Top 40 Tipparade)	4
Netherlands (Single Top 100)	32
UK Singles (Official Charts)	87
US Billboard Hot 100	8
US Mainstream Rock (Billboard)	17
US Cash Box Top 100 Singles	11
West Germany (GfK)	42
