= Paul DeVilliers =

- Born: United States
- Genres: Rock, pop music
- Occupations: Sound engineer, record producer

Paul DeVilliers is a sound engineer and record producer whose credits include Mr. Mister's best-selling 1985 album Welcome to the Real World and Yes's 1987 album Big Generator, which reached number 15 on the Billboard 200 albums chart.

== Career ==
DeVilliers' first appearance on a charting album was as a sound engineer for Yes's 1985 live album 9012Live: The Solos, which reached number 81 on the Billboard 200. Also in 1985, Mr. Mister's Welcome to the Real World was released, on which De Villiers received a co-producer credit. Welcome to the Real World topped the Billboard 200 chart, and spawned the hit singles "Broken Wings" (No. 1 on the Billboard Hot 100 for two weeks in 1985), "Kyrie" (No. 1 on the Hot 100 for two weeks in 1986), and "Is It Love" (No. 8 on the Hot 100).

In 1986, the DeVilliers-produced Mr. Mister song "Run To Her" was included on the soundtrack to the movie American Anthem, which also featured songs by Stevie Nicks, John Parr, INXS, and Duran Duran guitarist Andy Taylor. The soundtrack reached number 91 on the Billboard 200 albums chart.

DeVilliers resumed his involvement with Yes on the Big Generator album, taking over co-production duties with Yes guitarist Trevor Rabin after Trevor Horn, who had produced Yes' previous studio album, 90125, left the project. Big Generator, released in 1987, reached number 15 on the Billboard 200, and spawned the Top 40 singles "Rhythm of Love" and "Love Will Find a Way".

Since 1987, DeVilliers has also worked with Marc Jordan, Kim Mitchell, The Boomers and King Crimson.
