= Welcome to the Real World (Mr. Mister album) =

Studio album by Mr. Mister
- Released: June 20, 1985
- Recorded: October 1984 – April 1985
- Genres: Pop rock; New wave
- Length: 43:35
- Label: RCA Victor
- Producers: Mr. Mister; Paul DeVilliers

Mr. Mister chronology
| I Wear the Face (1984) | Welcome to the Real World (1985) | Go On... (1987) |

Singles from Welcome to the Real World
- 1. "Broken Wings" Released: June 1985; 2. "Kyrie" Released: December 1985; 3. "Is It Love" Released: March 1986; 4. "Black/White" Released: July 1986

Professional ratings
Review scores
| Source | Rating |
|---|---|
| AllMusic | 4/5 stars |
| Kerrang! | 5/5 stars |

Welcome to the Real World is the second studio album by American pop rock band Mr. Mister, released on June 20, 1985, by RCA Records. Two singles from the album, "Broken Wings" and "Kyrie", topped the US Billboard Hot 100 chart, while "Is It Love" peaked at number eight. Welcome to the Real World topped the Billboard 200 in March 1986, become RCA's first number one album since Jefferson Starship's album Red Octopus in November 1975. A remastered 25th-anniversary edition of Welcome to the Real World was released as a digipak on April 20, 2010.

== Reception ==
In 2024, Paul Elliott of Classic Rock called it "a classic melodic rock album featuring two of the defining songs of that era" and "a brilliant synthesis of AOR and new wave, comparable to the Cars' classic Heartbeat City."

== Track listing ==
All tracks written by Richard Page, Steve George and John Lang, with additional writers noted.

Side one
| No. | Title | Writer(s) | Length |
|---|---|---|---|
| 1. | "Black/White" | Steve Farris; Pat Mastelotto | 4:19 |
| 2. | "Uniform of Youth" | Farris; Mastelotto | 4:27 |
| 3. | "Don't Slow Down" | Farris | 4:29 |
| 4. | "Run to Her" | Farris; Mastelotto | 3:39 |
| 5. | "Into My Own Hands" | Farris | 5:10 |

Side two
| No. | Title | Writer(s) | Length |
|---|---|---|---|
| 6. | "Is It Love" | Mastelotto | 3:38 |
| 7. | "Kyrie" | | 4:26 |
| 8. | "Broken Wings" | | 5:44 |
| 9. | "Tangent Tears" | | 3:24 |
| 10. | "Welcome to the Real World" | Farris | 4:20 |
| Total length: | | | 43:35 |

2015 remastered reissue bonus tracks
| No. | Title | Writer(s) | Length |
|---|---|---|---|
| 11. | "Kyrie" (extended version) | | 4:15 |
| 12. | "Broken Wings" (live) | | 6:18 |
| 13. | "Uniform of Youth" (live) | Farris; Mastelotto | 4:48 |
| 14. | "Is It Love" (dance mix) | Mastelotto | 6:29 |
| 15. | "Is It Love" (dub mix) | Mastelotto | 4:17 |
| 16. | "Broken Wings" (extended version) | | 5:45 |
| Total length: | | | 75:27 |

== Personnel ==
Credits adapted from the liner notes of Welcome to the Real World.

=== Mr. Mister ===
- Richard Page – lead vocals, bass
- Pat Mastelotto – drums
- Steve Farris – guitar
- Steve George – keyboards, vocals

=== Additional musicians ===
- Jack Manning – additional programming
- Casey Young – additional programming

=== Technical ===
- Mr. Mister – production
- Paul DeVilliers – production, engineering
- Lois Oki – engineering
- Mick Guzauski – mixing
- Mike Shipley – mixing
- Bill Freesh – additional engineering
- Tony Peluso – additional engineering
- Tchad Blake, Judy Clapp, Carolyn Collins, Eddie Delena, Dave Egerton, Stuart Furusho, Heidi Hanscher, Coke Johnson, Stan Katayama, Daren Klein, Steve MacMillan, Richard Mekernan, Sebastian Thorer – engineering assistance
- Marge Meoli – production coordination

=== Artwork ===
- Joe Stelmach – art direction
- Jonathan Owen – front cover
- Rob Page – graphics
- Four Eyes – photography
- KK – graffiti

== Charts ==
=== Weekly charts ===
Weekly chart performance for Welcome to the Real World
| Chart (1986) | Peak position |
|---|---|
| Australian Albums (Kent Music Report) | 17 |
| Austrian Albums (Ö3 Austria) | 12 |
| Canada Top Albums/CDs (RPM) | 2 |
| Dutch Albums (Album Top 100) | 7 |
| European Albums (Music & Media) | 6 |
| Finnish Albums (Suomen virallinen lista) | 7 |
| German Albums (Offizielle Top 100) | 8 |
| Icelandic Albums (Tónlist) | 8 |
| Italian Albums (Musica e dischi) | 16 |
| Japanese Albums (Music Labo) | 17 |
| New Zealand Albums (RMNZ) | 21 |
| Norwegian Albums (VG-lista) | 2 |
| Swedish Albums (Sverigetopplistan) | 13 |
| Swiss Albums (Schweizer Hitparade) | 10 |
| UK Albums (Official Charts) | 6 |
| US Billboard 200 | 1 |

=== Year-end charts ===
Year-end chart performance for Welcome to the Real World
| Chart (1986) | Position |
|---|---|
| Australian Albums (Kent Music Report) | 79 |
| Canada Top Albums/CDs (RPM) | 5 |
| Dutch Albums (Album Top 100) | 27 |
| European Albums (Music & Media) | 30 |
| German Albums (Offizielle Top 100) | 40 |
| UK Albums (Gallup) | 61 |
| US Billboard 200 | 7 |

== Certifications ==
Certifications for Welcome to the Real World
| Region | Certification | Certified units/sales |
|---|---|---|
| Canada (Music Canada) | 3× Platinum | 300,000^{^} |
| Sweden (GLF) | Gold | 50,000^{^} |
| United Kingdom (BPI) | Gold | 100,000^{^} |
| United States (RIAA) | Platinum | 1,000,000^{^} |
^{^} Shipments figures based on certification alone.
