= Kyrie (song) =

Single by Mr. Mister

from the album Welcome to the Real World
- B-side: "Run to Her"; "Hunters of the Night"
- Released: December 1985
- Recorded: 1985
- Studio: Ocean Way Recording, Hollywood
- Genre: Pop rock
- Length: 4:25 (album version); 4:10 (single/video version)
- Label: RCA
- Songwriters: Richard Page; Steve George; John Lang
- Producers: Mr. Mister; Paul De Villiers

Mr. Mister singles chronology
"Broken Wings" (1985)	"Kyrie" (1985)	"Is It Love" (1986)

Music video
- "Kyrie" on YouTube

"Kyrie" is a 1985 song by American pop rock band Mr. Mister, from their album Welcome to the Real World. Released around Christmas in 1985, it hit the top spot on the Billboard Hot 100 in March 1986, where it was number 1 for two weeks. It also hit the top spot on the Billboard Top Rock Tracks chart for one week. In Australia and the UK, the song peaked at number 11 in 1986.

== Background and writing ==
The lyrics to "Kyrie" were written by John Lang, who co-wrote the songs on all of Mr. Mister's albums. The music was composed by Richard Page and Steve George while on tour with Adam Ant.

In Greek, Kýrie, eléison means "Lord, have mercy" and is a part of many liturgical rites in both Eastern and Western Christianity. Kýrie, eléison; Christé, eléison; Kýrie, eléison is a prayer that asks "Lord, have mercy; Christ, have mercy; Lord, have mercy." According to Page's statements, he was initially skeptical about singing the Christian text Lang had written because he didn't want to make a "religious statement".

"Kyrie" was recorded in Studios A and B of Ocean Way Recording in Hollywood with Paul De Villiers serving as producer. Upon hearing a demo of "Kyrie", De Villers was satisfied, but felt that it could be improved, so the band attempted to recut the song entirely live. This was deemed unsatisfactory, so Mr. Mister instead assembled the song in a piecemeal manner by recording each instrument individually into an API mixing console, with the intent of retaining a live feel.

The vocals were recorded using multitracking techniques by Page and George into an AKG-12 microphone. With the intention of recreating the sound of a choir, Page and George sang their parts on x marks that were placed around the studio by De Villers, who explained:

I didn’t have to pan things. It took a lot of tracks and a lot of bouncing. Steve and Rich would do a track and I would say, 'Great, move to the next X.' 'Great, next one.' 'Great, next X.' The last one was about 20 feet away from the mic. The mic stayed in the same [place], so it was as if each individual person in the choir came out and stood in their place and sang, and then we put it all together.

== Release ==
The single edit of "Kyrie" features an a cappella ending, differing from the fadeout on the version found on Welcome to the Real World. This decision was made to shorten the song's run-time for the purpose of making it more suitable for radio airplay.

In the United States, "Kyrie" debuted at No. 61 on the Billboard Hot 100, having received airplay from around half of all contemporary hit radio stations reporting to the publication within one week of its release. The following week, "Kyrie" ascended eleven spots on the chart and had amassed airplay on 80 percent of all Hot 100 reporting stations. During the week ending 25 January 1986, "Kyrie" had appeared on 213 out of 219 Hot 100 radio stations, more than any other song at the time. "Kyrie" ultimately topped both the Billboard Hot 100 and Album Rock Tracks chart and peaked at No. 3 on the Adult Contemporary chart.

The video, which was directed by Nick Morris and produced by Fiona O'Mahoney, shows the band in performance mixed with footage taken at the tail end of their Autumn 1985 tour with Tina Turner.

"Kyrie" was used in the hit U.S. TV series Miami Vice during season two, episode fourteen "One-Way Ticket". It was also used in the Netflix series GLOW as well as the ABC sitcom The Goldbergs. The U.S. 7" single can be found pressed on transparent purple vinyl or polystyrene, depending on where it was manufactured.

== Reception ==
Cashbox called "Kyrie" a "booming track" with "top musicianship and a soaring chorus hook." Billboard described the single as "seasonally appropriate, loosely spiritual and grandly performed".

== Personnel ==
Credits sourced from Mix

- Richard Page – lead and backing vocals, bass guitar
- Steve George – Yamaha DX7 and Prophet-5 synthesizers, backing vocals
- Steve Farris – electric guitars
- Pat Mastelotto – drum kit, Simmons SDSV electronic drums, LinnDrum programming

== Track listings ==
Non-UK 7-inch single

A. "Kyrie" – 4:10
B. "Run to Her" – 3:36

UK 7-inch single

A. "Kyrie" (edited version) – 3:38
B. "Kyrie" – 4:10

UK 12-inch single

A1. "Kyrie" – 4:10
B1. "Kyrie" (edited version) – 3:38
B2. "Hunters of the Night" – 4:07

European and Japanese 12-inch single

A1. "Kyrie" – 4:24
B1. "Run to Her" – 3:36
B2. "Hunters of the Night" – 5:07

The single edit (which was also used for the video version) ends with the a cappella phrase "Kýrie, eléison, down the road that I must travel", while the album version simply fades out.

== Charts ==
=== Weekly charts ===
Weekly chart performance for "Kyrie"
Chart (1986)	Peak position
Australia (Kent Music Report)	11
Austria (Ö3 Austria Top 40)	5
Belgium (Ultratop 50 Flanders)	7
Canada (The Record)	2
Canada Top Singles (RPM)	1
Canada Adult Contemporary (RPM)	3
Europe (European Hot 100 Singles)	4
Finland (Suomen virallinen lista)	14
Ireland (IRMA)	6
Netherlands (Dutch Top 40)	6
Netherlands (Single Top 100)	7
New Zealand (Recorded Music NZ)	30
Norway (VG-lista)	1
Sweden (Sverigetopplistan)	6
Switzerland (Schweizer Hitparade)	3
UK Singles (Official Charts)	11
US Billboard Hot 100	1
US Adult Contemporary (Billboard)	11
US Mainstream Rock Airplay (Billboard)	1
US Cash Box Top 100	1
West Germany (GfK)	7

=== Year-end charts ===
Year-end chart performance for "Kyrie"
Chart (1986)	Position
Australia (Kent Music Report)	80
Belgium (Ultratop 50 Flanders)	62
Canada Top Singles (RPM)	26
Europe (European Hot 100 Singles)	74
Netherlands (Dutch Top 40)	53
Netherlands (Single Top 100)	66
US Billboard Hot 100	9
US Album Rock Tracks (Billboard)	22
US Cash Box Top 100	15
West Germany (Media Control)	54

== Certifications ==
Region	Certification	Certified units/sales
New Zealand (RMNZ)	Gold	15,000^{‡}
^{‡} Sales+streaming figures based on certification alone.

== Cover versions ==
In 1993, Acappella Vocal Band, a traditional Southern gospel group, included a version of the song on their album U and Me and God Make 5 (Word). The group later recorded a Spanish version of the song as well. Also in 1993, the song, retitled as "Kyrie Eleison", was covered by Contemporary Christian music duo East to West on their self-titled debut album.

Contemporary Christian artist Mark Schultz recorded it for his 2001 album Song Cinema.
