= Broken Wings (Mr. Mister song) =

1985 song

- Picture sleeves used in some European territories

Single by Mr. Mister

from the album Welcome to the Real World
- B-side: "Uniform of Youth"
- Released: June 6, 1985
- Recorded: November 1984
- Genre: Pop rock; new wave
- Length: 5:42 (album version); 4:43 (radio/video edit); 4:30 (7" edit)
- Label: RCA
- Songwriters: Richard Page; Steve George; John Lang
- Producers: Mr. Mister; Paul De Villiers

Mr. Mister singles chronology
"Hunters of the Night" (1984)	"Broken Wings" (1985)	"Kyrie" (1985)

Music video
- "Broken Wings" on YouTube

Alternative release
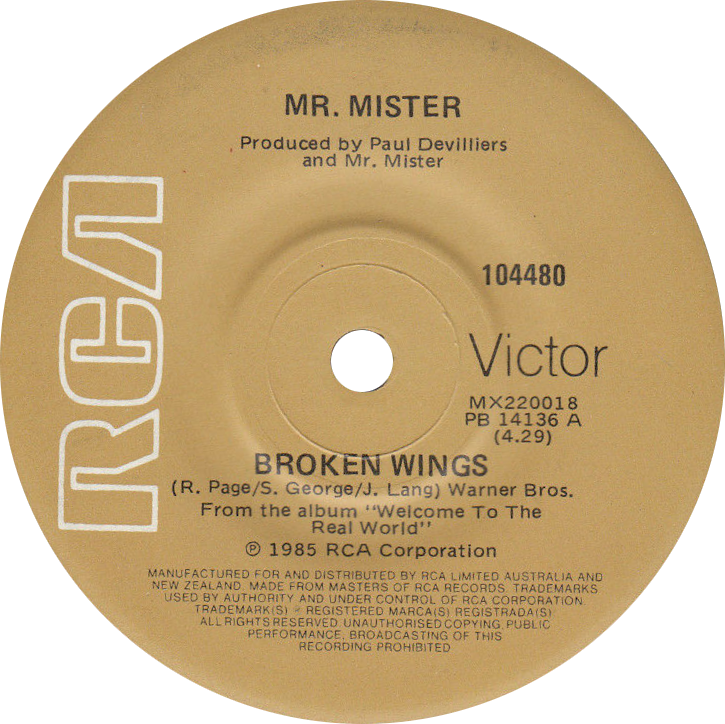
- Side A of Australian single

"Broken Wings" is a 1985 song recorded by American pop rock band Mr. Mister. It was released in June 1985 as the lead single from their second album Welcome to the Real World. The song peaked at number one on the Billboard Hot 100 in December 1985, where it remained for two weeks. "Broken Wings" became the first of two consecutive number ones of the band on the American charts, the other chart-topper being "Kyrie".

Outside of the United States, "Broken Wings" topped the charts in Canada, peaked within the top ten of the charts in Australia, Belgium (Flanders), Italy, the Netherlands, Norway, the Republic of Ireland, Switzerland, the United Kingdom and West Germany, and the top twenty of the charts in Austria, New Zealand, Spain and Sweden.

== Background and music ==
"Broken Wings" was written by Steve George, Richard Page, and his cousin John Lang in about twenty minutes at Page's home in Southern California. Page commented that "we weren't there to write. The drum machine was going. I started with the bass line. Before I knew it, the song was done. It just sort of happened and luckily I had the tape machine on."

Although the 1968 Beatles song "Blackbird" contains an identical lyric, "Take these broken wings and learn to fly", Richard Page has described this as "a mindless unintentional reference" attributable to his composition being influenced by the Gibran novel.

The album mix for "Broken Wings" exceeded five minutes, and the band wanted to create a radio edit for the single hoping that radio stations would find it more palatable for airplay. According to Page, one of the members suggested that they label the duration of the single at around 4 minutes and 30 seconds in hopes that no radio programmers would notice.

== Release ==
In the United States, "Broken Wings" did not enter the charts until roughly 12-13 weeks after its release. The song first became popular in Minneapolis and Denver before crossing over to other markets. By the week of September 28, 1985, "Broken Wings" was among the most added songs to Hot 100 radio stations reporting to Billboard.

"Broken Wings" began to receive airplay in Europe around the time that the single reached the top ten in the United States. Music & Media reported in their November 18, 1985 edition of the publication that "the German market was "very receptive" to the band and that the song was bubbling under the European Airplay Top 50 the previous week. The following month, "Broken Wings" had entered the European Airplay listing and was the most played song in Holland for the week of December 16, 1985.

== Music video ==
The music video for "Broken Wings" was directed by Oley Sassone and filmed in black and white. It features lead vocalist/bassist Richard Page driving through the desert in a classic Ford Thunderbird, the first allusion to birds. There is a scene where Page is sitting in a church when a Harris's hawk flies in through the window and lands next to him on the pew and they exchange a gaze. The full band is also featured in performance scenes. Also appearing in the video are an unknown man and woman dancing tango. They are only shown from the waist down. At the end of the video Page is seen next to the Thunderbird with the vehicle's hood open.

== Critical reception ==
Cash Box called "Broken Wings" a "softly textured track which plays off the group's ranging vocal abilities on what is clearly a CHR pick." Billboard thought that the song was "tastefully done". Music & Media characterized "Broken Wings" as a "dramatic and subtle ballad".

Stereogum wrote about the song:

Lyrically, "Broken Wings" is an attempt to keep a relationship together through the magic of flowery language: "Take these broken wings/ And learn to fly again, learn to live so free/ When we hear the voices sing/ The book of love will open up and let us in." Those words are grandiloquent enough to be self-parody, but Page delivers them all perfectly straight-faced. He means every bit of it. In Page's mouth, the word "take" becomes a desperate animal yelp. I love it. I also love how overproduced "Broken Wings" is. The song is all ominous churn, and it never really kicks in. Instead, it captures a state of sustained anticipation.

== Track listing ==
7" single

1. "Broken Wings" (single edit) – 4:29
2. "Uniform of Youth" – 4:25

12" maxi single

1. "Broken Wings" (album version) – 5:45
2. "Uniform of Youth" – 4:25
3. "Welcome to the Real World" – 4:18

== Charts ==
=== Weekly charts ===
Weekly chart performance for "Broken Wings"
Chart (1985–1986)	Peak position
Australia (Kent Music Report)	4
Austria (Ö3 Austria Top 40)	17
Belgium (Ultratop 50 Flanders)	2
Canada Top Singles (RPM)	1
Canada Adult Contemporary (RPM)	2
Europe (European Hot 100 Singles)	3
Ireland (IRMA)	3
Italy (Musica e dischi)	6
Netherlands (Dutch Top 40)	3
Netherlands (Single Top 100)	2
New Zealand (Recorded Music NZ)	13
Norway (VG-lista)	4
South Africa (Springbok Radio)	20
Spain (AFYVE)	13
Sweden (Sverigetopplistan)	14
Switzerland (Schweizer Hitparade)	4
UK Singles (Official Charts)	4
US Billboard Hot 100	1
US Adult Contemporary (Billboard)	3
US Mainstream Rock Airplay (Billboard)	4
US Cash Box Top 100	1
West Germany (GfK)	8

=== Year-end charts ===
1985 year-end chart performance for "Broken Wings"
Chart (1985)	Position
Canada Top Singles (RPM)	37
US Cash Box Top 100	52

1986 year-end chart performance for "Broken Wings"
Chart (1986)	Position
Australia (Kent Music Report)	44
Belgium (Ultratop 50 Flanders)	50
Canada Top Singles (RPM)	76
Europe (European Hot 100 Singles)	43
Netherlands (Dutch Top 40)	40
Netherlands (Single Top 100)	62
UK Singles (Gallup)	99
US Billboard Hot 100	5
US Adult Contemporary (Billboard)	25
US Cash Box Top 100	72
West Germany (Media Control)	57

== Certifications ==
Certifications for "Broken Wings"
Region	Certification	Certified units/sales
Canada (Music Canada)	Gold	50,000^{^}
United Kingdom (BPI)	Gold	400,000^{‡}
^{^} Shipments figures based on certification alone.^{‡} Sales+streaming figures based on certification alone.

== K'Lee version ==
New Zealand pop singer K'Lee covered "Broken Wings" and released it as a single on June 11, 2001. Her version peaked at number two on the New Zealand Singles Chart, becoming her highest-charting single there along with 2002's "Can You Feel Me?"

=== Charts ===
Chart performance for "Broken Wings"
Chart (2001)	Peak position
New Zealand (Recorded Music NZ)	2

== Samples ==
"Broken Wings" was sampled in the posthumous Tupac song "Until the End of Time". The song reached No. 4 in the UK.
