= Richard Page (musician) =

American musician (born 1953)

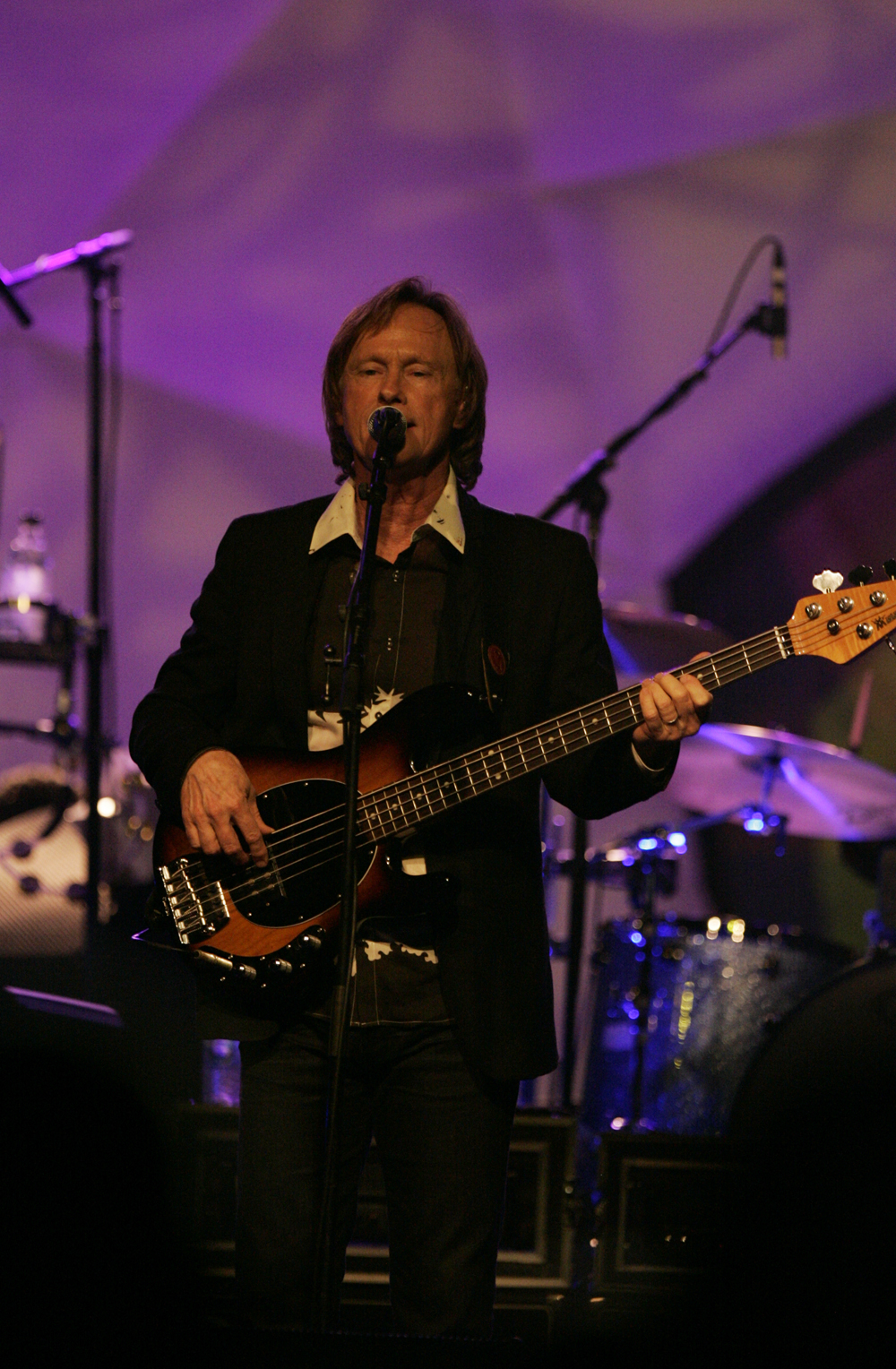
- Page performing in 2013

Background information
- Born: Richard James Page; May 16, 1953 (age 73); Keokuk, Iowa, U.S.
- Origin: Los Angeles, California, U.S.
- Genres: Rock; pop
- Occupations: Musician; singer; songwriter
- Instruments: Vocals; bass; guitar; keyboards
- Years active: 1977–present
- Label: RCA
- Formerly of: Pages; Mr. Mister; Third Matinee
- Website: richardpagemusic.com

Richard James Page (born May 16, 1953) is an American musician who is best known as the lead singer and bassist of 1980s band Mr. Mister. The band's hits include "Broken Wings" and "Kyrie". Page has also sung in other bands, been a solo artist, written songs for other artists, and worked as a background singer for other artists.

== Early life ==
Page graduated from Central High School in Phoenix, Arizona. His mother worked as the Assistant Director of the Phoenix Boys Choir, while his father was a musical director at a Phoenix church. During high school, Page performed in school musicals such as Oliver! Page cited that his musical influences at this stage included The Beatles and The Beach Boys. Immediately following his high school graduation, he moved to Hollywood.

== Career ==
In Los Angeles, Page and Steve George, a friend from Phoenix, "knocked around the LA music scene, eventually working with topflight acts like REO Speedwagon, Andy Gibb, Al Jarreau, and Kenny Loggins". Page turned down offers to be the lead singer for the bands Chicago and Toto. Page's first major band, Pages, was formed with Steve George in the late 1970s.

After producing three Pages albums, Page and George formed Mr. Mister along with Steve Farris and Pat Mastelotto. Page was on vocals/bass, George handled keyboards, Farris played guitar, and Mastelotto was on drums. Page is best known for his work with Mr. Mister. The band's first album was I Wear the Face (1984). Page has said that in this album the band was "just getting together and figuring out" how they wanted to sound.

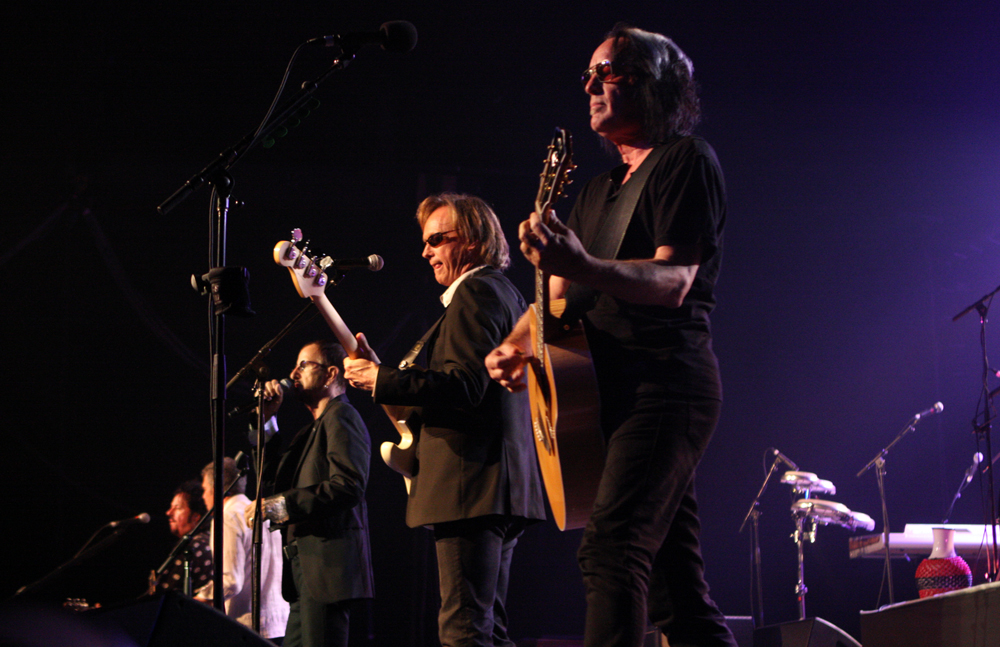
Page (middle) performing with Ringo Starr and Todd Rundgren in 2013

As frontman for Mr. Mister, Page scored two consecutive Billboard Hot 100 number ones with the singles "Broken Wings" and "Kyrie", both of which Page composed in collaboration with his cousin, John Lang. In 1985, both songs appeared on Mr. Mister's breakthrough second album, Welcome to the Real World, which reached number 1 on the album charts. The group was nominated for several Grammy Awards, including Best Pop Band in 1986. The band scored another hit with "Is It Love" (1986), which reached number 8 in the charts.

Mr. Mister's third album, Go On... was released in 1987. In an interview, Page said that the band "tried many new and different sounds and ideas" and that it included some of the band's best songwriting. Before breaking up on September 25, 1990, the group recorded a fourth album, Pull, in 1989. The album was not released until 2010. Page has described Pull as the group's "most experimental album".

Many of Page's songs for Mr. Mister, and many of his solo numbers, were co-written with Steve George and John Lang.

Page has also been a solo artist, and he has worked as a background singer for other artists and bands. He has written songs for popular artists such as Barbra Streisand, Celine Dion, Dionne Warwick, and Josh Groban, among others. Page also co-wrote one Madonna hit “I’ll Remember”” in 1994. With Jay Graydon, he wrote the theme for the 1980s television sitcom Gimme a Break! Performed by series star Nell Carter, this theme replaced the original after two seasons.

Page released his first solo album, Shelter Me, in 1996. It featured the singles "The Best Thing" and "My Oxygen", written by Nik Kershaw.

Based on a recommendation by his friend, songwriter Richard Marx, Ringo Starr approached Page to join his 11th All-Starr Band and, in the summer of 2010, they embarked on a 32-date U.S. tour; in 2011 they embarked on a 40-date Europe tour. Page also toured with Ringo's 12th All-Starr Band in the summer of 2012, 2013, and 2017.

== Personal life ==
Page and his wife, Linda, have four children.

== Discography ==
=== Solo albums ===
- Shelter Me (1996)
- Peculiar Life (2010)
- Songs from the Sketchbook (2012)
- Goin' South (2015)

=== Live albums ===
- Solo Acoustic (2011) (DVD/CD)

=== Extended plays ===
- Acoustic (1996)
- 5 Songs for Christmas (2010)

=== with Pages ===
- Pages (1978)
- Future Street (1979)
- Pages (1981)

=== with Mr. Mister ===
- I Wear the Face (1984)
- Welcome to the Real World (1985)
- Go On... (1987)
- Pull (2010)

=== with 3rd Matinee ===
- Meanwhile (1994)

=== Notable album appearances ===
- 1979: Keep the Fire – Kenny Loggins (background vocals)
- 1980: Hi Infidelity – REO Speedwagon (background vocals)
- 1981: Runaway – Bill Champlin; on "Satisfaction" and "Gotta Get Back to Love" (background vocals)
- 1981: Breakin' Away – Al Jarreau (background vocals)
- 1981: Sometimes Late at Night – Carole Bayer Sager (background vocals)
- 1982: Friends in Love – Dionne Warwick (background vocals)
- 1982: Jon Stevens – Jon Stevens (background vocals)
- 1982: Three Lock Box – Sammy Hagar (background vocals)
- 1983: Caught in the Game – Survivor (background vocals)
- 1983: Shout at the Devil – Mötley Crüe (background vocals)
- 1983: A Christmas Album – Amy Grant (background vocals)
- 1983: Bent Out of Shape – Rainbow (backing vocals) "Street of Dreams"
- 1984: Primitive – Neil Diamond
- 1984: Isolation – Toto (background vocals)
- 1984: Stay Hungry – Twisted Sister (background vocals)
- 1984: "High Crime" – Al Jarreau (background vocals)
- 1984: Straight Ahead – Amy Grant (background vocals); on "It's Not a Song"
- 1985: Finder of Lost Loves – Dionne Warwick (background vocals)
- 1985: Vox Humana – Kenny Loggins (background vocals and accompanying vocals)
- 1985: Rhythm of the Night – DeBarge; on "Who's Holding Donna Now" (background vocals)
- 1985: Unguarded – Amy Grant; on "I Love You" and "Sharayah" (background vocals)
- 1986: Something to Talk About – Anne Murray; on "Now and Forever (You and Me)" (background vocals)
- 1986: The Collection – Amy Grant; on "Stay for Awhile" (background vocals)
- 1986: David Foster – David Foster; on "Who's Gonna Love You Tonight"
- 1986: Can't Hold Back – Eddie Money; on "One Chance" (background vocals)
- 1987: Reservations for Two – Dionne Warwick; on "No One in the World" (background vocals)
- 1988: Back to Avalon – Kenny Loggins (background vocals)
- 1988: Shadow and Light – Joe Zawinul; (lead vocal on "The Immigrants")
- 1988: Rock of Life – Rick Springfield; (Background vocals on "One Reason")
- 1989: Slip of the Tongue – Whitesnake; on "Now You're Gone" (background vocals)
- 1990: Conserve Our World – Marc Jordan (background vocals)
- 1991: Love Hurts – Cher; accompanying vocals on "One Small Step"
- 1992: Kingdom of Desire – Toto; on "2 Hearts" and "Kingdom of Desire" (background vocals)
- 1995: I'll Lead You Home – Michael W. Smith (background vocals)
- 1999: Mindfields – Toto; on "Mindfields" (background vocals)
- 2000: Birdland – Masanori & LA Allstars (lead vocal on "Green Flower Street")
- 2001: Until the End of Time – Tupac Shakur (accompanying vocals on "Until the End of Time")
- 2002: Familiar to Me – Joe Zawinul; (lead vocal on "Faces and Places")
- 2003: Closer – Josh Groban (background vocals)
- 2005: The Day After Yesterday; duet with Rick Springfield on his cover of "Broken Wings"
