= Mr. Mister =

American rock band

- Origin: Phoenix, Arizona, U.S.
- Genres: Pop rock; new wave
- Years active: 1982–1990 (one-off reunions: 2023, 2025)
- Labels: RCA; Little Dume
- Spinoff of: Pages
- Past members: Richard Page; Steve George; Pat Mastelotto; Steve Farris

Mr. Mister was an American rock band from Phoenix, Arizona, active from 1982 until 1990. The band consisted of Richard Page on lead vocals/bass guitar, Steve George on keyboards/backing vocals, Pat Mastelotto on drums/percussion, and Steve Farris on guitars/backing vocals.

The band is best known for their second album Welcome to the Real World (1985), which reached No. 1 in the US, and the three US Top 10 singles from the album, "Broken Wings", "Kyrie", and "Is It Love", the first two of which reached No. 1.

== 1978-1982: Formation ==
Although formed in Phoenix, Arizona, United States, Mr. Mister was based in Los Angeles, California. Richard Page had previously worked as a session musician (for Quincy Jones) and had composed for Michael Jackson, Rick Springfield, Donna Summer, Kenny Loggins, Al Jarreau, and many more.

In 1978, Page and his childhood friend Steve George founded the band Pages in Phoenix, Arizona. Pages explored a pop fusion sound, with a changing lineup of session musicians. Although Pages had a minor hit single with "I Do Believe in You", and its three albums garnered favorable reviews, the group had little commercial success. After disbanding Pages in 1981, Page and George focused on songwriting and studio session work for pop artists ranging from Laura Branigan to Village People.

By 1982, Page and George began putting together a more pop-oriented group with a permanent lineup, rounded out by drummer Pat Mastelotto and guitarist Steve Farris. All four members had done extensive session work for other artists and brought numerous influences to the band. The initial plan was to bring in a fifth member, a bass guitarist, but after realizing that Page, who was originally slated to be solely the lead singer, could also play bass, the members decided to remain a four-piece.

== 1983-1988: Mainstream ==
When the first Mr. Mister album, I Wear the Face, was released by RCA Records in 1984, Page was offered the chance to replace Bobby Kimball as lead singer of Toto, and later was offered Peter Cetera's place in Chicago; he refused both offers.

Their second album, 1985's Welcome to the Real World—with lyrics from Page's cousin John Lang—was the breakthrough for Mr. Mister. All three singles were in the top 10, two of which hit No. 1 on the U.S. pop charts—"Broken Wings" and "Kyrie". The former was inspired by the book of the same title by Kahlil Gibran. They had several No. 1 MTV videos, and performed at the first MTV Spring Break show in 1986.

Mr. Mister was nominated for two Grammy Awards, including Best Pop Band. However, they lost the 28th Annual Grammy Awards to the global phenomenon "We Are the World" ensemble, USA for Africa.

During this time, Mr. Mister toured with other popular acts including Don Henley, The Bangles, Eurythmics, Tina Turner, Heart, and Adam Ant. The band's third album was Go On..., which was not a large commercial success, and delivered only one top 40 hit in the U.S.

During the 1980s, the group wrote and/or performed songs for several movies, including the title song for Stand and Deliver, and "Is It Love" as the outro track for Stakeout. "Don't Slow Down" appeared in A Fine Mess. The band also made concert appearances with the pop rock band the Bangles.

Guitarist Steve Farris left in 1988. The remaining band members teamed up with Christian recording artist Paul Clark and acted as his backup band for Clark's 1988 indie release Awakening from the Western Dream.

=== Final album and breakup ===
The band began working on a fourth album, Pull, with session guitarists Buzz Feiten, Trevor Rabin, Doug Macaskill and Peter McRea. The album was completed in 1990, but RCA Records decided not to release it.

Soon afterward, the band broke up in 1990 generally credited to the commercial disappointment of Go On..., and a subsequent regime change at RCA Records who declined to release Pull.

== 1990-2025: Legacy ==
On 23 November 2010, the remastered fourth album, Pull, was finally released in collaboration with Sony Music, on Richard Page's independent label, Little Dume Recordings. Although one track ("Waiting in My Dreams") appeared on a 2001 greatest hits collection by the band.

In 2009 the band was referred to in the chorus of platinum-selling song "Hey, Soul Sister" by Train, with the line "Ain't that Mr. Mister on the radio, stereo?". Hey, Soul Sister went on to win a Best Pop Performance by Group with Vocals at the 53rd Annual Grammy Awards.

On 16 May 2023 - for Page's 70th birthday - all four members of Mr. Mister performed "Broken Wings" together. This was their first performance together in over 34 years.

In late September 2025, all four members once again got together, this time to celebrate Pat Mastelotto's 70th birthday. They performed several songs together at Mastelotto's Thrak Shack studio, with a video of the "Broken Wings" performance being released on 7 December 2025 to celebrate the song's 40th anniversary. Another video from the same session, of the "Kyrie" performance, was released shortly after on the 25 December along with Christmas greetings.

The members also did an interview in September 2025 with Anil Prasad about the band's history.

== Band members ==
- Richard Page – lead vocals, bass (1982–1990, 2023, 2025), guitar (1988–1990)
- Steve George – keyboards, saxophone, backing vocals (1982–1990, 2023, 2025)
- Pat Mastelotto – drums, percussion (1982–1990, 2023, 2025)
- Steve Farris – guitar, backing vocals (1982–1988, 2023, 2025)

Collaborations

- John Lang - lyrics

While not a formal member of Mr. Mister, John Lang, Richard Page's cousin, wrote most lyrics on all of their albums.

== Discography ==
=== Studio albums ===
- I Wear the Face (1984)
- Welcome to the Real World (1985)
- Go On... (1987)
- Pull (2010)

== Awards and nominations ==
Year	Association	Category	Work	Result
1986	Grammy Awards	Best Pop Performance by a Duo or Group	"Broken Wings"	Nominated
1987	Grammy Awards	Grammy Award for Best Gospel Performance	"Healing Waters"	Nominated
