= Steve George (keyboardist) =

American musician (born 1955)

- Born: May 20, 1955 (age 71); Bloomington, Illinois, U.S.
- Origin: Los Angeles, California, U.S.
- Genres: Rock; pop
- Occupations: Musician; singer; songwriter
- Instruments: Vocals; keyboards; saxophone
- Years active: 1977–present
- Label: RCA

Steve George (born May 20, 1955) is an American keyboard player, saxophone player and singer who is perhaps best known as the keyboardist and (for the most part) background vocalist for the 1980s band, Mr. Mister. He co-wrote all of the Mr. Mister songs, together with his childhood friend, Mr. Mister frontman Richard Page, with whom he also played in Pages prior to forming Mr. Mister.

In the 1980s and 1990s he was a sought-after songwriter, studio musician and singer in the Los Angeles session scene. As a songwriter, he has co-written hits for artists such as Al Jarreau, The Pointer Sisters, Patti Labelle and Meatloaf. He has sung backup for various artists including:

- Peter Allen on the Bi-Coastal album
- Al Jarreau, various albums
- Cher, various albums
- Amy Grant, various albums
- Barry Manilow on Oh Julie (EP) and his 1982 album
- Kenny Loggins, various albums (on which he also played keyboards and co-wrote).
- Marc Jordan, on his Hole in the Wall (1983) and 'C.O.W. (Conserve Our World) (1990) albums
- Richard Marx, on his Rush Street album (1991)
- Toto, on the Kingdom of Desire album (1992)
- Richard Page, on the 'Shelter Me' album (1996).

Aside from three new Mr. Mister songs released in January 2020, his most recent collaboration in the studio was with Moonbound, featuring on piano and saxophone on the Uncomfortable News from the Moon album (2015). Fellow Mr. Mister bandmates Pat Mastelotto and Steve Farris also contributed to the album.

Mr. Mister having disbanded in September 1990, Steve George briefly resurfaced as a session singer for artists such as Toto, Richard Marx and Marc Jordan before joining Kenny Loggins as musical director from 1991 to 1997, contributing keyboards and background vocals on several albums and tours. He then toured with Jewel, as her keyboardist and background singer from 1998 to 2003. Having since retired from the music industry, he currently resides in Sedona, Arizona and occasionally sits in with local bands, most recently The Naughty Bits.

In an online chat with Inside Musicast in April 2020, Mr. Mister's manager George Ghiz stated, "Steve lives up in Northern Arizona with his lovely wife, who we grew up with, and their two children - one of them's living in Hawaii now - a son and a daughter who are both very musical and very smart kids. He's not in the music business anymore. He does music but I wouldn't say he's in the music business anymore. He's retired. But what a genius, what an amazing genius he is!". Ghiz also expressed that he'd "love to see him [Richard Page] and Steve George do something together, you know, even if it's just the two of them, I would love that, you know". Inside Musicast correspondent Scott Gross remarked to Ghiz that, "I remember back when we had lunch, you would mention and Richard had mentioned some interest in revisiting the Pages music and kind of bringing that up to date and re-recording some stuff live, that he couldn't get Steve George to want to do it", to which Ghiz replied, "I have nothing further to add to that, you said it all". He elaborated, "Steve is just so smart, you know, and he just doesn't want to look back, that's the simplest way to put it. He just doesn't have any interest in looking back". However, Ghiz revealed that "I have it on my calendar every eighteen months to ask him and it's coming up... I wouldn't look at it as looking back, I would look at it as enjoying the fact that this is your stuff, you know. At this point you never know. It's on the calendar for another ask. You know, the great news is we, again with all these guys I've a good relationship, so it's not like I'm afraid to talk to them about it. What bums me out is that the years go by".
