= Sail Away (Urban Cookie Collective song) =

1994 single by Urban Cookie Collective

Single by Urban Cookie Collective

from the album High on a Happy Vibe
- Released: 7 February 1994
- Studio: Moonraker (Manchester, England)
- Genre: Dance
- Length: 3:23
- Label: Pulse-8
- Songwriter: Rohan Heath
- Producer: Rohan Heath

Urban Cookie Collective singles chronology
"Feels Like Heaven" (1993)	"Sail Away" (1994)	"High on a Happy Vibe" (1994)

Music video
- "Sail Away" on YouTube

"Sail Away" is a song by British band Urban Cookie Collective, released in February 1994 by Pulse-8 Records as the third single from their debut album, High on a Happy Vibe (1994). Written by producer Rohan Heath, the vocals were performed by Diane Charlemagne. It was a top-10 hit in Finland (number three) and Switzerland, and a top 20-hit the UK, peaking at number 18. On the Eurochart Hot 100, it reached number 28. Outside Europe, the song was a top-20 hit in Israel and a top-50 hit in Australia. The accompanying music video was directed by British director and assistant director Lindy Heymann, and received A-list rotation on German music television channel VIVA in March 1994.

== Critical reception ==
Tim Jeffery from Music Week's RM Dance Update wrote, "The Cookies strive for a slice of underground credibility by drawing on the remixing talents of Judge Jules to turn what is an irritating song into a more dub-worthy groove—and they've just about pulled it off. The chunky, funky rhythm rolls along nicely with the vocals comfortably sitting astride this bumpy track. Pop DJs will go for the vocal version but the dubs are credible enough for the rest of us." James Hamilton noted in his weekly RM dance column, "...chugging digi-funk 123bpm J Jules & M Skins Mixes with Johnny Jay's more typical cheesily synthed galloping 132bpm Maximum Development Mix, pattering 127bpm Overworld Dub..."

Tony Cross from Smash Hits gave "Sail Away" a score of four out of five, writing, "Obviously totally together, the Collective have left the key under the mat, got more funky for their latest chart assault — and hit the spot again. The combined skills of Judge Jules and Michael Skins have produced a wickedly slick mix of pure dance perfection. And Diane Charlemagne's vocals must be some of the best around. Another top 10 hit should be plain sailing."

== Track listing ==
- 7-inch single, UK (1994)

A. "Sail Away" (Maximum Development 7-inch) – 3:22
B. "Sail Away" (The Cookied Edit) – 3:38

- 12-inch, UK (1994)

A1. "Sail Away" (Maximum Development Mix) – 6:21
A2. "Sail Away" (Overworld Dub Mix) – 6:36
B1. "Sail Away" (Judge Jules & Michael Skins Pop Funk Mix) – 6:35
B2. "Sail Away" (Judge Jules & Michael Skins Sexy Dub) – 6:35

- CD single, UK (1994)
1. "Sail Away" (Maximum Development 7-inch) – 3:25
2. "Sail Away" (The Cookied Edit) – 3:40
3. "Sail Away" (Maximum Development Mix) – 6:23
4. "Sail Away" (Overworld Dub Mix) – 6:38
5. "Sail Away" (Judge Jules & Michael Skins Pop Funk Mix) – 6:41
6. "Sail Away" (Judge Jules & Michael Skins Sexy Dub) – 6:43
7. "Sail Away" (The Cookied Mix) – 5:42
- Cassette single, UK (1994)
1. "Sail Away" (Maximum Development 7-inch) – 3:22
2. "Sail Away" (The Cookied Edit) – 3:38

== Charts ==
=== Weekly charts ===
Chart (1994)	Peak position
Australia (ARIA)	49
Austria (Ö3 Austria Top 40)	24
Belgium (Ultratop 50 Flanders)	23
Europe (Eurochart Hot 100)	28
Europe (European Dance Radio)	4
Finland (Suomen virallinen lista)	3
Germany (GfK)	25
Israel (Israeli Singles Chart)	11
Netherlands (Dutch Top 40)	23
Netherlands (Single Top 100)	21
Sweden (Sverigetopplistan)	35
Switzerland (Schweizer Hitparade)	21
UK Singles (OCC)	18
UK Dance (Music Week)	9
UK Club Chart (Music Week)	53

=== Year-end charts ===
Chart (1994)	Position
Netherlands (Dutch Top 40)	194

== Release history ==
Region	Date	Format(s)	Label(s)	Ref.
United Kingdom	7 February 1994	7-inch vinyl; 12-inch vinyl; CD; cassette	Pulse-8	
Australia	7 March 1994	CD; cassette	Liberation	
