= Lindy Heymann =

British director and assistant director

- Occupations: Music video director; commercial director; feature film director
- Years active: 1990s-present
- Spouse: Terry Hall

Lindy Heymann is a British director and assistant director, known for Showboy (2002), The Laughing King (2016) and Kicks (2009).

== Career ==
She received a British Independent Film Award (BIFA) for Best Directorial Debut for her feature film debut Showboy (2002). She also directs music videos and commercials and has worked with many acts. Her work includes videos for Chase & Status, Imelda May, Keane and Take That as well as a live concert DVD for the Specials which was nominated for a UK Music Video Award. In August 2019, it was announced that she would be directing a biopic on Richey Edwards from Manic Street Preachers titled 4real.

== Filmography ==
- Kissing Buba (2000)
- Showboy (2002)
- Kicks (2009)
- The Laughing King (2016)

== Videography ==
- Felix - It Will Make Me Crazy (1992)
- Kingmaker - Armchair Anarchist (1992)
- Suede - Metal Mickey (1992)
- Suede - The Drowners (1992)
- The Auteurs - Showgirl (1992)
- David Gray - Wisdom (1993)
- Evolution - Love Thing (1993)
- Judy Cheeks - So In Love (The Real Deal) (1993)
- Leftfield & John Lydon - Open Up (1993)
- Matt Bianco - Our Love (1993)
- Molly Half Head - Barny (1993)
- Rage - House Of The Rising Sun (1993)
- Raw Stylus - Use Me (1993)
- Robin S. - What I Do Best (1993)
- Sister Sledge - Lost In Music (1993)
- Staxx - Joy (1993)
- The Auteurs - How Could I Be Wrong? (1993)
- The Auteurs - Lenny Valentino (1993)
- Urban Cookie Collective - Feels Like Heaven (1993)
- Urban Cookie Collective - The Key, The Secret (1993)
- Cud - Neurotica (1994)
- Cud - Sticks And Stones (1994)
- David McAlmont - Either (1994)
- Echobelly - Close, But... (1994)
- Gloworm - Carry Me Home (1994)
- G.W. McLennan - Fingers (1994)
- Inspiral Carpets - Uniform (1994)
- Kristine W - Feel What You Want (1994)
- Melanie Williams - Everyday Thang (1994)
- Melanie Williams - Not Enough (1994)
- Mr. V - Give Me Life (1994)
- Neil Arthur - I Love I Hate (1994)
- Sister Bliss - Cantgetaman Cantgetajob (Life's A Bitch) (1994)
- The Auteurs - Chinese Bakery (1994)
- The Proclaimers - Let's Get Married (1994)
- The Proclaimers - What Makes You Cry (1994)
- Ultramarine & Robin Wyatt - Happyland (1994)
- Urban Cookie Collective - Sail Away (1994)
- Duffy - London Girls (1995)
- Faithless - Insomnia (1995)
- Faithless - Salva Mea (1995)
- Grant McLennan - Simone & Perry (1995)
- Kristine W - One More Try (1995)
- Melanie Williams & Joe Roberts - You Are Everything (1995)
- Michelle Gayle - Happy Just To Be With You (1995)
- Mister Jones - Out Of My Hair (1995)
- Out of my Hair - In The Groove Again (1995)
- Sister Bliss - Oh What A World (1995)
- Sleeper - What Do I Do Now? (1995)
- Teenage Fanclub - Mellow Doubt (1995)
- Tin Tin Out feat. Espiritu - "Always Something There to Remind Me" (1995)
- The Charlatans - Just Lookin' (1995)
- The Charlatans - Just When You're Thinking Things Over (1995)
- Dugstad - Elevator Song (1996)
- Faithless - Don't Leave (1996)
- Faithless - If Lovin' You Is Wrong (1996)
- Leftfield - Release The Pressure (1996)
- Lisa Moorish - Love For Life (1996)
- Mundy - Life's A Cinch (1996)
- Octopus - Jealousy (1996)
- Pauline Taylor - Constantly Waiting (1996)
- Ricky Ross - Good Evening Philadelphia (1996)
- Ricky Ross - Radio On (1996)
- Sister Bliss - Badman (1996)
- The Brotherhood - One Shot (1996)
- The Bluetones - Slight Return (1996)
- Faithless - Insomnia [USA version] (1997)
- Faithless - Reverence (1997)
- Geneva - Into The Blue (1997)
- Geneva - Tranquillizer (1997)
- Hurricane #1 - Just Another Illusion (1997)
- Hurricane #1 - Step Into My World (1997)
- Michelle Gayle - Sensational (1997)
- Terry Hall - Ballad Of A Landlord (1997)
- Terry Hall - I Saw The Light (1997)
- The Charlatans - How High [UK version] (1997)
- The Charlatans - North Country Boy (1997)
- The Charlatans - One To Another (1997)
- The Lightning Seeds - What You Say (1997)
- Delakota - The Rock (1998)
- Headswim - Tourniquet (1998)
- Linda McCartney - The White Coated Man (1998)
- Montrose Avenue - Shine (1998)
- Six by Seven - For You (1998)
- Skinny - Failure (1998)
- Santessa - Eyes On You (1999)
- Sea Fruit - Hello World (1999)
- Black Box Recorder - The Facts Of Life (2001)
- Ronan Keating - She Believes (In Me) (2003)
- Lil' Love - Little Love (2005)
- Supafly vs Fishbowl - Let's Get Down (2005)
- The Stands - Do It Like You Like (2005)
- One Night Only - Just For Tonight (2007)
- Amy MacDonald - Run (2008)
- One Night Only - It's About Time (2008)
- Sarah Whatmore - Undefined (2008)
- Take That - Said It All (2009)
- Chase & Status - Time (2011)
- Imelda May - Inside Out (2011)
- Keane - Sovereign Light Cafe (2012)
- Imelda May - Wild Woman (2014)
