= Christian Taylor (filmmaker) =

British-Argentine-American filmmaker (born 1968)

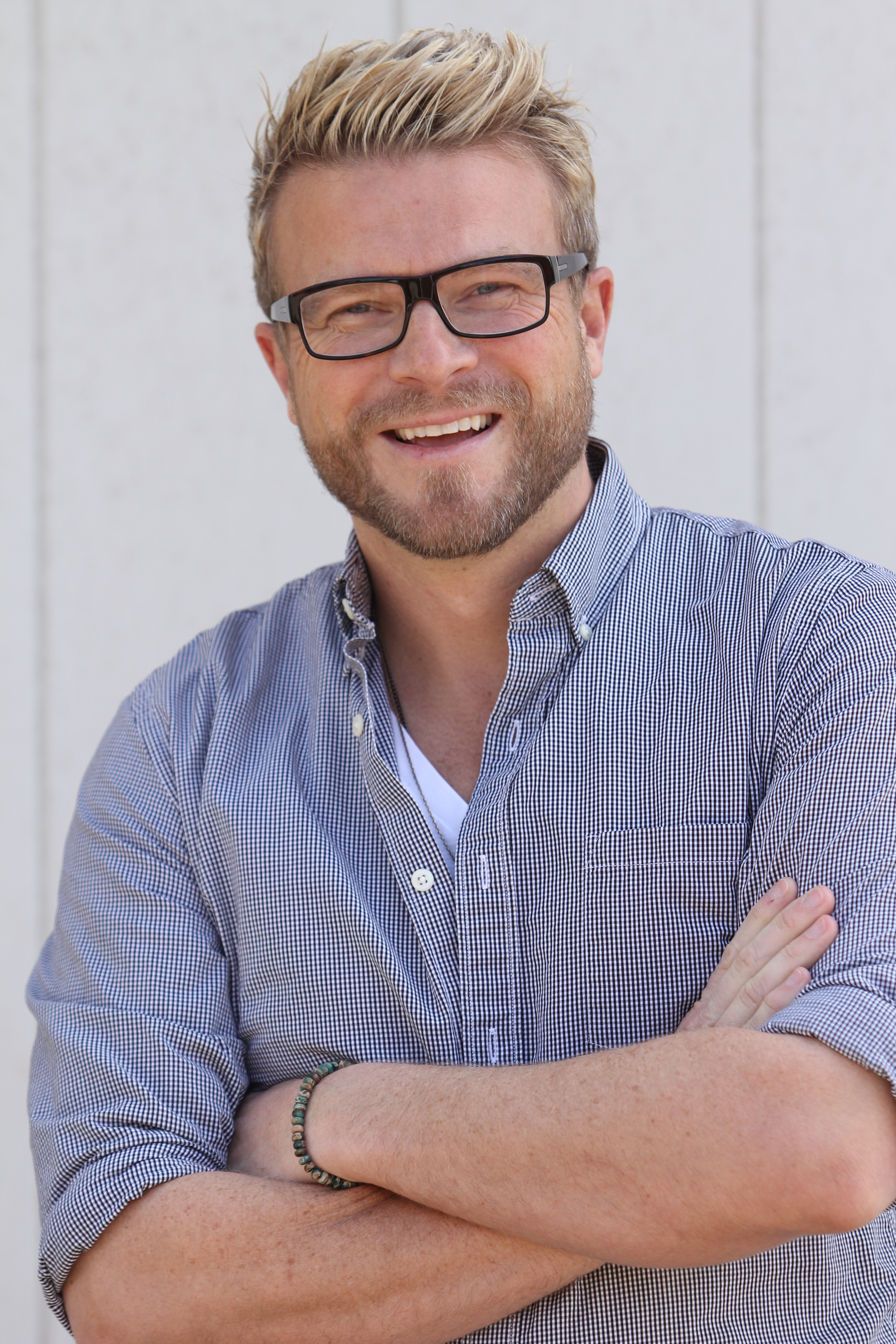
- Born: July 17, 1968 (age 58); London, England, UK
- Education: New York University
- Occupations: Director; Writer; Producer
- Years active: 1990—present

Christian Taylor (born July 17, 1968) is a British-Argentine-American screenwriter, director, and producer known for his work on the American television series Lost, Six Feet Under, Teen Wolf, Clone Wars, Resident Alien, Eye Candy and the award-winning independent film Showboy, which he codirected and starred in. Christian is a proud member of the LGBTQ+ community and actively works to encourage representation across Film and TV storytelling.

== Early life ==
Taylor was born in London, England to an Argentine father and British mother. Soon after his birth, the family moved to Mexico City for three years. On their return to London, they lived in the culturally diverse and artistic community of Notting Hill. As a teenager, he went to Bedales School in Hampshire where both Daniel Day-Lewis and Minnie Driver attended. He did his art foundation course at the Central School of Art and Design and then moved to the United States after being accepted by New York University Tisch School of the Arts.

== Career ==
As a student at New York University, Taylor wrote and directed his thesis film, The Lady in Waiting in 1992, which won the gold medal for Best Dramatic Film at the Student Academy Awards and went on to be nominated for the Academy Award for Best Live-Action Short Film.

Taylor was integral to the development and filming of the pilot of the HBO drama Six Feet Under in 2001, and went on to be a writer-producer on the show and received an Emmy Award nomination for Outstanding Drama Series in 2002. Taylor's script for the season 2 episode, “In Place of Anger,” was nominated for a Writers Guild of America (WGA) Award in 2003.

He co-wrote, co-directed, and starred in the 2002 independent Mockumentary film, Showboy, which won the Douglas Hickox Award for best directorial debut at the British Independent Film Awards and was named Best Picture at the Milan International Film Festival.

In 2003, Taylor became a writer and producer on ABC's dramatic series Miracles, before beginning work on the first season of the network's breakout hit, Lost.

As there was no pilot shot, Taylor was one of only four writers brought on to brainstorm and develop what the show would eventually be. As a writer and supervising producer on Lost, Taylor won the 2006 Writers Guild of America Award for Best Dramatic Series.

In 2008, he co-created Fox's sci-fi crime drama New Amsterdam.

He went on to become the head writer on Lucasfilm’s animated series, Star Wars: The Clone Wars writing episodes for the show’s third, fourth, and fifth seasons and received a 2015 Emmy Award nomination for Outstanding Writing in an Animated Program.

Taylor’s relationship with MTV began with the 2009 release of the horror miniseries, Valemont, which he wrote and co-directed.

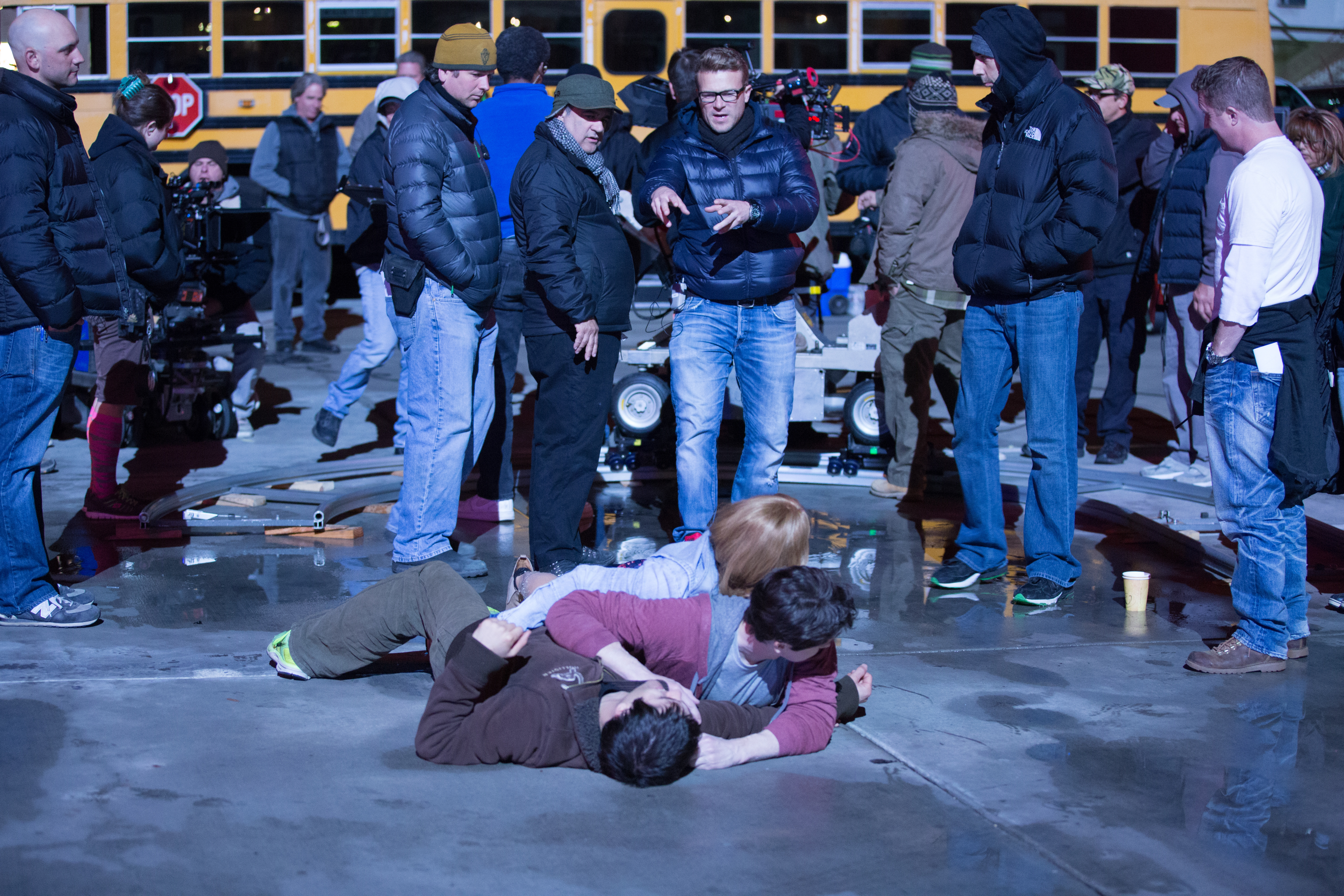
Christian Taylor directs the Teen Wolf episode "Motel California"

He returned to MTV as a writer, director, and co-executive producer on Teen Wolf during the show's second, third, and fourth seasons directing the fan-favorite episode called Motel California.

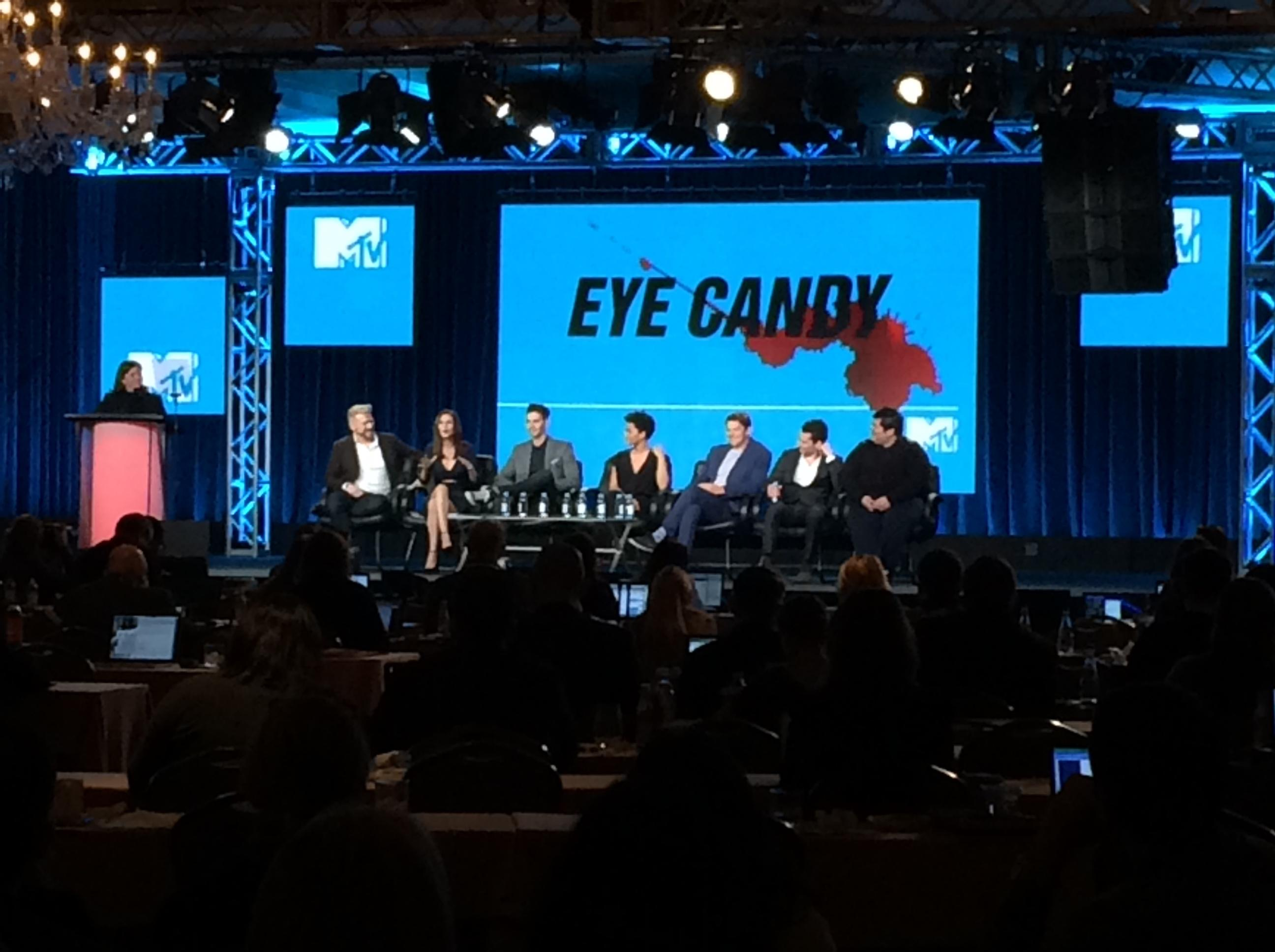
Eye Candy Press Junket Panel

In 2014, Taylor developed and was showrunner and Executive producer of the MTV drama-thriller series Eye Candy, starring Victoria Justice. Production began in New York City in September 2014, with Jax Media and the ten-episode first season was released in January 2015. The hugely popular show was canceled after MTV decided to stop producing or programing live action TV.

He was co-executive producer and writer on the Marvel series Luke Cage, which was released in 2018.

He was asked to return to Lucasfilm and wrote two episodes of The Bad Batch in its first season.

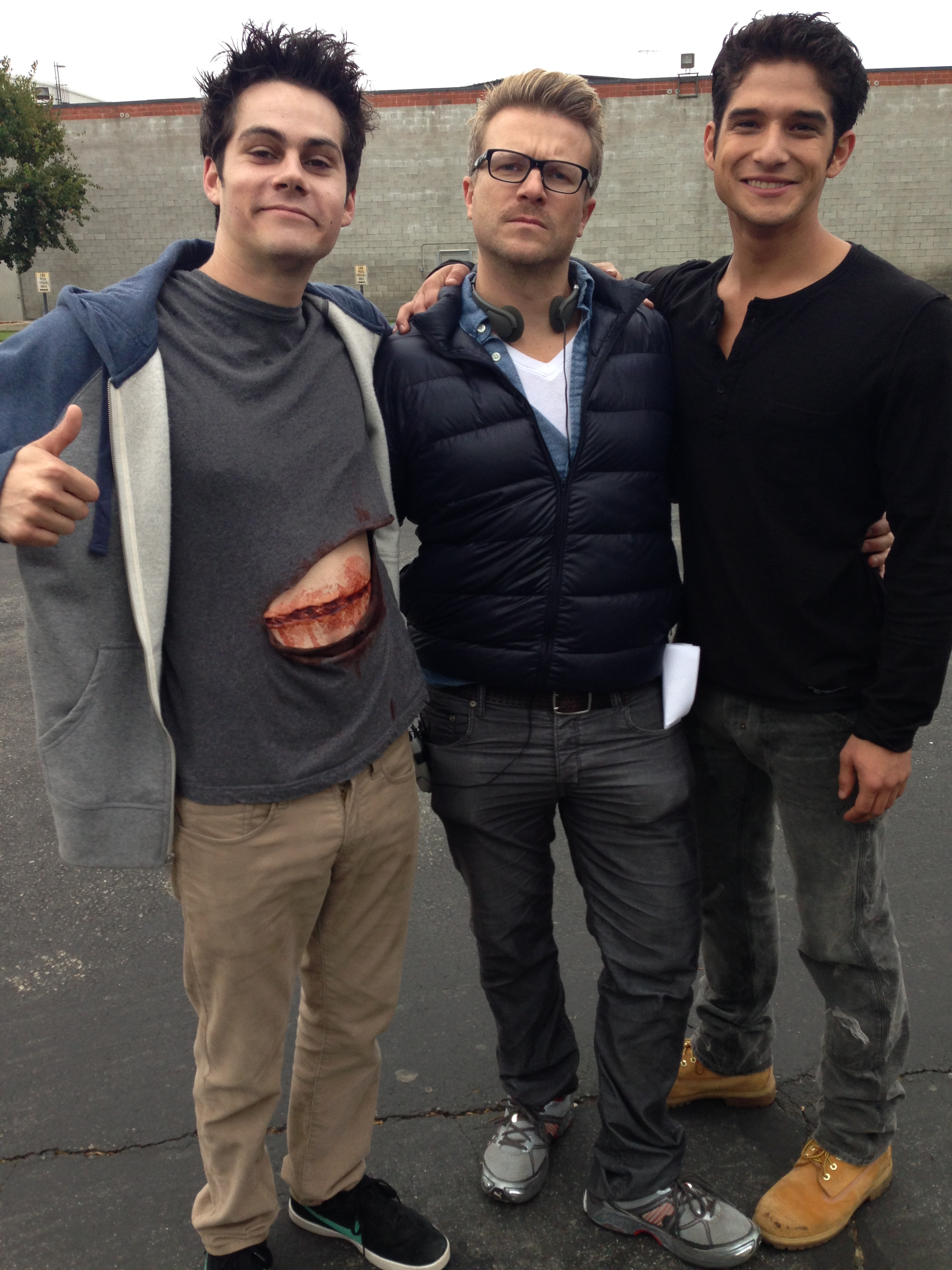
Christian Taylor on Teen Wolf set with Tyler Posey and Dylan O'Brien

Taylor was a co-executive producer for the critically acclaimed SYFY series Resident Alien, which received awards for Best Cable Series and Best Comedy from the Hollywood Critics Association during its first season.

== Filmography ==
=== Films ===
Year	Title	Director	Writer	Producer	Notes
1990	If Only Forever	Yes	Yes	No	Short films / Also editor
1992	The Lady in Waiting	Yes	Yes	No	Short films / Also editor
2002	Showboy	Yes	Yes	Co-Producer	Mockumentary, co-directed with Lindy Heymann / Role: Himself
2013	The Adventurer: The Curse of the Midas Box	No	Yes	No	
TBA	Mariah Mundi and the Tablets of Destiny	No	Yes	No	

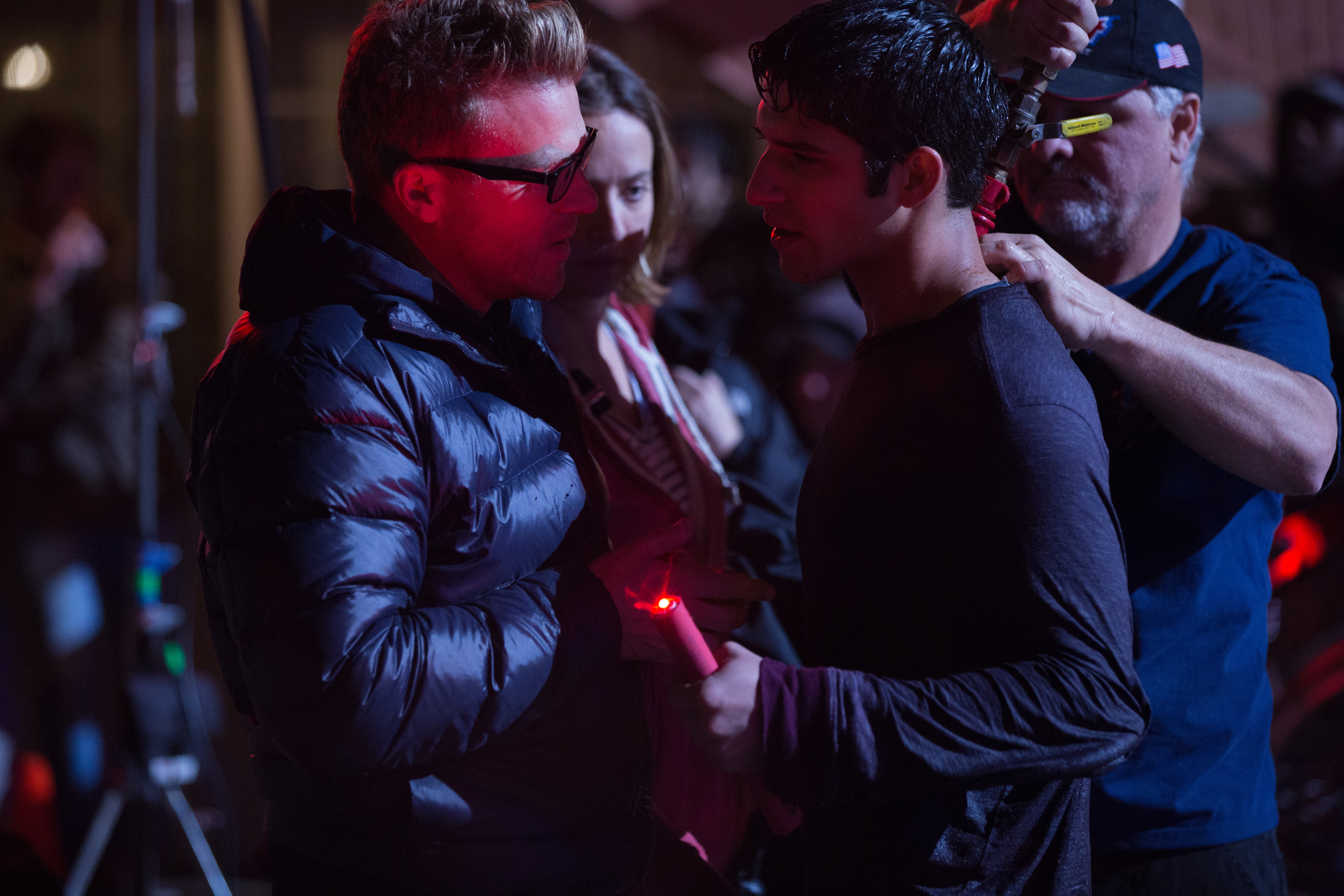
Christian Taylor Directs Tyler Posey on Teen Wolf Episode 306, "Motel California"

=== Television ===
Year	Title	Director	Writer	Producer	Notes
2001-2002	Six Feet Under	No	Yes	Yes	Writer (3 episodes) / Producer (10 episodes)
2003	Miracles	No	Yes	Yes	Writer (2 episodes) / Producer (12 episodes)
2004-2005	Lost	No	Yes	Supervising	Writer (episode "White Rabbit") / Producer (11 episodes)
2008	New Amsterdam	No	Yes	No	Creator (8 episodes)/ Writer (episode: "Pilot')
2009	Valemont	No	Yes	No	4 episodes
2011-2014	Star Wars: The Clone Wars	No	Yes	No	15 episodes
2012	Teen Wolf Revelations	No	No	Consulting	Episode: "Origins"
2012-2014	Teen Wolf	Yes	Yes	Consulting & Co-Executive	Director (3 episodes) / Writer (3 episodes) / Producer (25 episodes) / Role: Thomas (2 episodes)
2015	Eye Candy	No	Yes	Executive	Developer & producer (10 episodes) / Writer (3 episodes)
2016	Luke Cage	No	Yes	Co-Executive	Writer ( 2 episodes) / Producer (13 episodes)
2019	Treadstone	No	No	Co-Executive	3 episodes
2021	Resident Alien	No	Yes	Co-Executive	Writer (episode: "End of the World As We Know It") / Producer (10 episodes)
2021	Star Wars: The Bad Batch	No	Yes	No	2 episodes

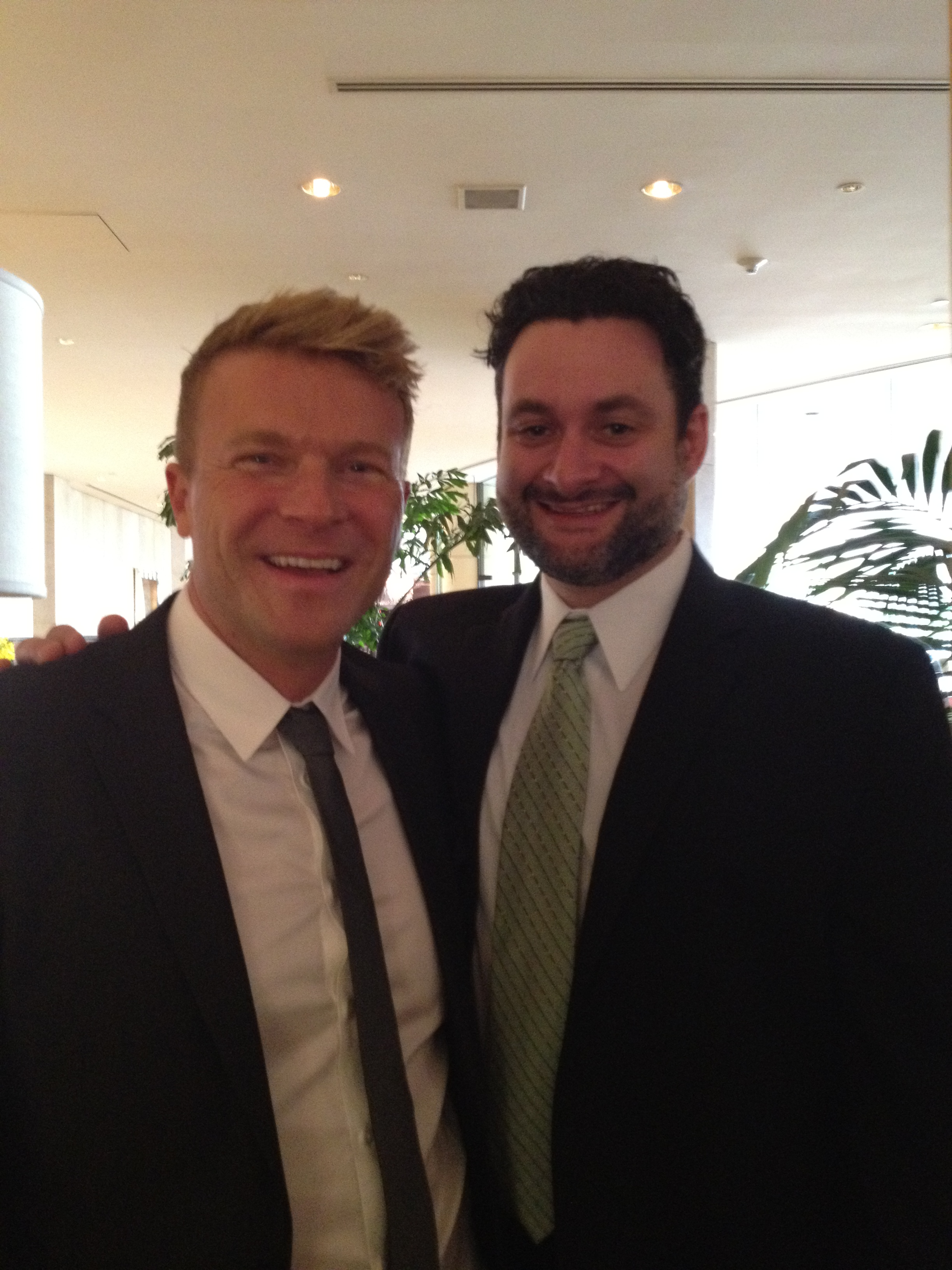
Christian Taylor and Dave Filoni at the Emmys for Clone Wars

== Awards ==
Year	Award	Category	Work	Result
1993	Academy Awards	Best Short Film, Live Action	The Lady in Waiting	Nominee
2002	Primetime Emmy Awards	Outstanding Drama Series	Six Feet Under	Nominee
2002	Online Film & Television Association	Best Writing in a Drama Series	Six Feet Under	Nominee
2002	British Independent Film Awards	The Douglas Hickox Award	Showboy	Winner
2002	Milano International Film Festival Awards	Best Film	Showboy	Winner
2003	Writers Guild of America Awards	Episodic Drama	Six Feet Under: "In Place of Anger"	Nominee
2006	Writers Guild of America Awards	Dramatic Series	Lost	Winner
2010	Streamy Awards	Best Interactive Experience in a Web Series	Valemont	Winner
2010	Streamy Awards	Best Writing for a Drama Web Series	Valemont	Nominee
2015	Daytime Emmy Awards	Outstanding Writing in an Animated Program	Star Wars: The Clone Wars	Nominee

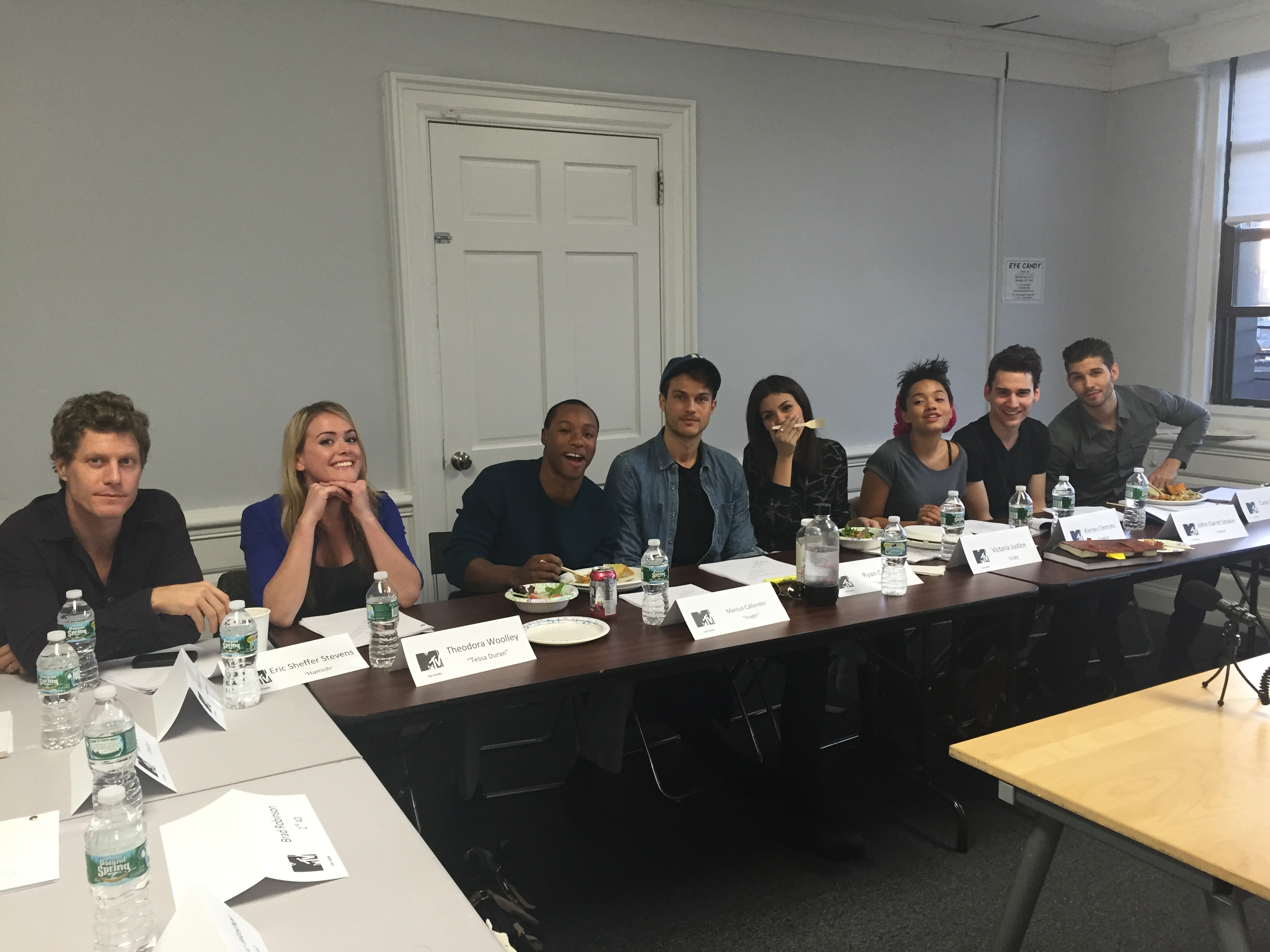
Eye Candy Table Read
