= High on a Happy Vibe =

1994 studio album by Urban Cookie Collective

Studio album by Urban Cookie Collective
- Released: February 8, 1994
- Recorded: 1993
- Studio: Moonraker Studios, Manchester; Peermusic
- Label: Pulse-8
- Producer: Rohan Heath

Urban Cookie Collective chronology
| High on a Happy Vibe (1994) | Tales from the Magic Fountain (1995) |

High on a Happy Vibe is the debut album by British Eurodance band Urban Cookie Collective, released in 1994. The album includes the singles "The Key, the Secret" (UK No. 2), "Feels Like Heaven" (UK No. 5), "Sail Away" (UK No. 18), "High on a Happy Vibe" (UK No. 31) and "Bring It on Home (Family)" (UK No. 56).

== Critical reception ==
Professional ratings
Review scores
| Source | Rating |
|---|---|
| Music Week | 3/5 stars |
| Smash Hits | 2/5 stars |

David Bennun from Melody Maker wrote, "Remember "The Key, the Secret", that mellifluous delight? Envision an album of sweet little dance songs, none of them quite so mellifluous or delightful, but each clutched just as surely in the iron grip of ruthless optimism." Alan Jones from Music Week named the album Pick of the Week, saying, "With a trio of hits under their collective belt, UCC's debut is a Teutonically up beat affair in common with German bands such as Culture Beat and Captain Hollywood Project. Their basic style is a mutant form of hi-NRG, a form which they explore with melodic ease."

== Track listing ==
All tracks written by Rohan Heath, except where noted.

| No. | Title | Writer(s) | Length |
|---|---|---|---|
| 1. | "The Key, the Secret" | Elvio Moratto | 3:41 |
| 2. | "Feels Like Heaven" | | 3:29 |
| 3. | "Walk Right On" | | 4:54 |
| 4. | "Yours Is the Love" | | 4:41 |
| 5. | "Dreaming in Colours" | | 4:04 |
| 6. | "Sail Away" | | 3:22 |
| 7. | "World Wide Reunion" | | 4:32 |
| 8. | "Bring It on Home (Family)" | | 4:42 |
| 9. | "Hidden Land" | | 4:13 |
| 10. | "High on a Happy Vibe" | | 5:15 |
| 11. | "The Key, the Secret" (Kamoflage Club Mix) | Moratto | 6:40 |
| 12. | "Sail Away" (Judge Jules & Michael Skins Vocal Pop Funk Mix) | | 6:38 |

Note

- Tracks 11 and 12 available on CD only.

== Personnel ==
Adapted from AllMusic.

- Charlemagne – vocals
- Andrew Greasly – engineer
- Rohan Heath – producer
- Judge Jules – producer, remixing
- Lee Monteverde – engineer
- Michael Skins – producer, remixing
- Urban Cookie Collective – primary artist

== Charts ==
Chart performance for High on a Happy Vibe
| Chart (1994) | Peak position |
|---|---|
| Australian Albums Chart | 34 |
| Austrian Albums Chart | 31 |
| Dutch Albums Chart | 55 |
| Hungarian Albums (MAHASZ) | 25 |
| Swedish Albums Chart | 50 |
| UK Albums Chart | 28 |
