= I Love I Hate =

Single by Neil Arthur

from the album Suitcase
- Released: 24 January 1994
- Studio: Livingston Recording Studios (London)
- Length: 4:16 (single version); 4:30 (album version)
- Label: Chrysalis
- Songwriter: Neil Arthur
- Producer: Marius de Vries

Neil Arthur singles chronology
"One Day, One Time" (1992)	"I Love I Hate" (1994)

"I Love I Hate" is a song by the English singer and musician Neil Arthur, released on 24 January 1994 by Chrysalis Records as the lead single from his debut solo studio album, Suitcase (1994). It was written by Arthur and produced by Marius de Vries. It reached No. 50 on the UK singles chart and remained on the charts for two weeks.

For the single's 12" format releases, remixes were created by the English electronic dance group the Grid, with others by Dom T. and Marius de Vries. A music video was filmed in Coney Island and New York City to promote the single. It was directed by Lindy Heymann.

== Critical reception ==
Upon its release, Music & Media wrote, "The ex-frontman of Blancmange returns at almost the same point where he left seven years ago. His synth-flavoured new wave of the early '80s is spiced up with dance beats." Alan Jones of Music Week considered it to be "pleasant commercial fare from Arthur, albeit not as startlingly innovative as some of his work with Blancmange or the West India Company". He felt the song was a "likely Top 40 contender" which "should find favour with radio in its regular mix, while The Grid's deeper dance interpretations tie up the club end of things". Jim Lawn of The Lennox Herald remarked that Arthur "delivers a reasonable single with a nice hook and some radical dance remixes by The Grid".

Penny Kiley of the Liverpool Echo described it as a "pleasant electro-pop song that is less quirky than his previous work". She felt the inclusion of "Living on the Ceiling" as a bonus track on the CD issues of the single "suggests Neil may not be so confident in his new stuff". Terry Staunton of NME was critical of the song, stating it "has 'ordinary' tattooed right across its forehead" and calling Arthur "a poor man's Pet Shop Boy if ever there was one" who "made a couple of decent records as half of Blancmange". He added, "A plain, tinny, synthetic backing track with the dullest of vocals across the top. Not in the least bit good in any way at all."

In an article on 1980s New Wave band comebacks, Keith Creighton of Popdose described the song as "positively epic". Barry Page of The Electricity Club, in a feature titled "30 Lost Songs of the CD Era", considered the song to be "rather pedestrian" in comparison to Arthur's "engaging" debut single "One Day, One Time".

== Formats ==
CD single (UK CD #1)
No.	Title	Written by	Length
1.	"I Love I Hate"	Neil Arthur	4:14
2.	"Festival"	Arthur	4:09
3.	"Living on the Ceiling performed by Blancmange"	Arthur; Stephen Luscombe	4:02

CD single (UK CD #2)
No.	Title	Written by	Length
1.	"I Love I Hate (Extended Mix)"		4:30
2.	"Wendy You're a Bore"	Arthur	3:35
3.	"Oh No Not Yet"	Arthur	5:55
4.	"Feel Me (12" Mix) performed by Blancmange"	Arthur; Luscombe	7:03

CD single (European release)
No.	Title	Length
1.	"I Love I Hate"	4:16
2.	"Festival"	4:10
3.	"I Love I Hate (Vocal Mix)"	7:35
4.	"Living on the Ceiling performed by Blancmange"	4:01

12" single
No.	Title	Remixers	Length
1.	"I Love I Hate (Excalibur Mix)"	The Grid	7:27
2.	"I Love I Hate (Lakeside Mix)"	The Grid	4:58
3.	"I Love I Hate (2.45... Nuttall Street Mix)"	Dom T.; Marius de Vries	7:13
4.	"I Love I Hate (7" Edit)"	Dom T.; De Vries	4:14

== Personnel ==
- Neil Arthur – vocals
- Sylvia Mason-James, Mary Cassidy – backing vocals
- Mark Bandola – guitar

Production

- Marius de Vries – producer of "I Love I Hate"
- John Mallinson, Ben Jones – engineers on "I Love I Hate"
- James Thompson – assistant engineer on "I Love I Hate"
- Phil Bodger – mix engineer on "I Love I Hate"
- Neil Arthur – producer of "Festival", "Wendy You're a Bore" and "Oh No Not Yet"

== Charts ==
Chart (1994)	Peak position
UK Singles Chart	50
