= 1 (Felix album) =

#1

Studio album by Felix
- Released: 29 March 1993
- Genres: Dance; house
- Label: Deconstruction
- Producer: Felix

Professional ratings
Review scores
Source	Rating
Melody Maker	(favorable)
Music Week	4/5 stars
NME	6/10

#1 is the debut album by British DJ and producer Francis Wright, known under the pseudonym of Felix. It was released in March 1993 by Deconstruction and is his only album to date. It features the hit singles "Don't You Want Me", "It Will Make Me Crazy" and "Stars". The album peaked at No. 26 on the UK Official Charts.

== Track listing ==
1. "Fastslow" – 7:52
2. "Fools in Love" – 5:26
3. "You Gotta Work" – 8:40
4. "Stars" – 7:07
5. "It's Me" – 6:00
6. "Don't You Want Me" – 4:04
7. "It Will Make Me Crazy (Mmmm Mix)" – 5:41

== Charts ==
Chart (1993)	Peak position
Australia (ARIA)	124
Austria (Ö3 Austria Top 40)	24
Germany (GfK)	76
Netherlands (Dutch Album Top 100)	86
Sweden (Sverigetopplistan)	45
Switzerland (Swiss Hitparade)	29
UK Albums Chart (OCC)	26
