= High on a Happy Vibe (song) =

1994 single by Urban Cookie Collective

Single by Urban Cookie Collective

from the album High on a Happy Vibe
- Released: 11 April 1994
- Recorded: Moonraker (Manchester, England)
- Genre: Eurodance
- Length: 3:35
- Label: Pulse-8
- Songwriter: Rohan Heath
- Producer: Rohan Heath

Urban Cookie Collective singles chronology
"Sail Away" (1994)	"High on a Happy Vibe" (1994)	"Bring It On Home (Family)" (1994)

Music video
- "High on a Happy Vibe" on YouTube

"High on a Happy Vibe" is a song by British band Urban Cookie Collective, released in April 1994 by Pulse-8 Records as the fourth single from the band's debut album by the same name (1994). Written and composed by Rohan Heath, the vocals were by Diane Charlemagne, who also provided the vocal for the band's three previous hit singles. The song was a top-10 hit in Finland and a top-30 hit in Belgium, Ireland and the Netherlands. In the United Kingdom, "High on a Happy Vibe" peaked at number 31 on the UK Singles Chart. The accompanying music video for the song was directed by David Betteridge, featuring the band performing on a flying carpet.

== Critical reception ==
Pan-European magazine Music & Media wrote, "The dance craze started in the UK. Then the continentals took over with "Euro Dance". The Cookies are the British answer to the phenomenon, and taste like Swedish "kecks" and German "Kuchen"." James Hamilton from Music Week's RM Dance Update described the song as a "quovery chugging cheesy chanter" in his weekly dance column.

== Track listings ==
- 12-inch single, UK (1994)
1. "High on a Happy Vibe" (original 12-inch mix) — 5:52
2. "High on a Happy Vibe" (Johnny L Sinus mix) — 6:23
3. "High on a Happy Vibe" (Development Corporation mix) — 5:54
4. "High on a Happy Vibe" (Overworld mix) — 6:38
- CD single, Europe (1994)
1. "High on a Happy Vibe" (original 7-inch edit) — 3:35
2. "High on a Happy Vibe" (original 12-inch mix) — 5:52
- CD maxi, Germany (1994)
1. "High on a Happy Vibe" (original 7-inch edit) — 3:35
2. "High on a Happy Vibe" (original 12-inch mix) — 5:52
3. "High on a Happy Vibe" (Johnny L Sinus mix) — 6:23
4. "High on a Happy Vibe" (Development Corporation mix) — 5:54
5. "High on a Happy Vibe" (Overworld mix) — 6:38
6. "High on a Happy Vibe" (Johnny L Learner mix) — 5:36

== Charts ==
Weekly chart performance for "High on a Happy Vibe"
Chart (1994)	Peak position
Australia (ARIA)	71
Belgium (Ultratop 50 Flanders)	24
Europe (Eurochart Hot 100)	89
Europe (European Dance Radio)	7
Finland (IFPI)	8
Ireland (IRMA)	30
Israel (Israeli Singles Chart)	11
Netherlands (Dutch Top 40)	27
Netherlands (Single Top 100)	37
New Zealand (Recorded Music NZ)	48
Scotland (OCC)	18
Switzerland (Schweizer Hitparade)	49
UK Singles (Official Charts)	31
UK Airplay (Music Week)	29
UK Dance (Music Week)	12
UK Club Chart (Music Week)	25

== Release history ==
Release dates and formats for "High on a Happy Vibe"
Region	Date	Format(s)	Label(s)	Ref.
United Kingdom	11 April 1994	7-inch vinyl; 12-inch vinyl; CD; cassette	Pulse-8	
Australia	9 May 1994	CD; cassette	Pulse-8; Liberation	
