= Showboy =

- Directed by: Lindy Heymann; Christian Taylor
- Produced by: Jason Buchtel
- Starring: Christian Taylor; Lindy Heymann; Joe Daly; Erich Miller; Jason Buchtel
- Distributed by: Regent Releasing
- Release date: June 22, 2002
- Running time: 93 minutes
- Countries: United States; United Kingdom
- Language: English
- Budget: $300,000

Showboy is a 2002 mockumentary film that was produced by Jason Buchtel, directed by Christian Taylor and Lindy Heymann, and written by and starring the three. It has cameos by Whoopi Goldberg, Siegfried & Roy, Alan Ball and the cast of the television series Six Feet Under.

== Plot ==
The film, a mockumentary that viewers are meant to believe is real, features around real-life screenwriter Taylor. Taylor is solicited by director Heymann to be the subject in a British television documentary series about British writers working in Hollywood. On the first day of filming this documentary, Taylor is fired from his real-life job as a screenwriter on the dramatic television series Six Feet Under. He is unaware that the documentary crew knows this has occurred.

He then relocates to Las Vegas to pursue a dream of becoming a professional showboy (a chorus line dancer). He lies to the documentary crew, purporting to be doing research for a film project. It slowly becomes evident that he is desperate to find a new career, and at the same time he slowly begins to come out of the closet and pursue romance.

== Credits ==
(Note: cast is playing fictional versions of themselves)

- Christian Taylor as himself
- Lindy Heymann as herself
- Marilyn Milgrom as a producer in London
- Joe Daly as himself
- Erich Miller as himself
- Jason Buchtel as himself
- Aaron Porter as a dance instructor
- Adrian Armas as himself
- Billy Sameth as Billy

== Reception ==
Showboy won The Douglas Hickox Award for Best Directorial Debut at the British Independent Film Awards and Best Film at the Milan Film Festival.
