= Suitcase (Neil Arthur album) =

Studio album by Neil Arthur
- Released: 1994
- Genre: Synth-pop
- Length: 40:57
- Label: Chrysalis
- Producer: Adam Fuest; Marius de Vries; Neil Arthur; John Williams; Phil Bodger

Professional ratings
Review scores
Source	Rating
Music Week	2/5 stars

Suitcase is the debut solo studio album by Neil Arthur, released in 1994 by Chrysalis Records.

Before the release of the album in 1994, the song "One Day, One Time" had been released as Arthur's debut solo single in 1992, but failed to chart. However it was a radio hit. When the album surfaced, it failed to chart within the UK Top 100. Despite the lack of commercial success from the album, the second and final single "I Love I Hate" peaked at #50 in the UK in 1994, and lasted within the Top 100 for two weeks.

In January 2013, Arthur was interviewed for the StevoMusicMan wordpress website, and was asked about the Suitcase album. The interviewer asked if Arthur felt strange working on an album without his Blancmange partner Stephen Luscombe, and what he learnt from the project. Arthur revealed: "No, it didn't feel strange at all. I enjoyed making it. I'm still learning! I'll do another one day one time!"

== Critical reception ==
Upon release, Neil McKay of Sunday Life wrote: "Suitcase shows Arthur hasn't lost his knack for the nifty pop song" and highlighted the title track, "Breaking My Heart" and "I Know These Things About You".

== Track listing ==
=== UK CD: CDCHR 6065 ===
All songs written by Neil Arthur, except where noted.

1. "Breaking My Heart" – 4:17
2. "I Love I Hate" – 4:29
3. "Suitcase" – 4:02
4. "Jumping Like A Kangaroo" – 3:49
5. "I Know These Things About You" – 4:05
6. "Heaven" – 4:06
7. "That's What Love Is Like" – 3:07
8. "One Day, One Time" – 3:32 (Arthur, Kenton)
9. "Jukebox Theory" – 4:01
10. "The Beach" – 5:29 (Arthur, Henderson)

== Personnel ==
=== Production ===
- Adam Fuest - producer, engineer (1, 4, 7)
- Marius De Vries - producer (2, 6)
- Neil Arthur - producer (3)
- John Williams and Neil Arthur (5, 9)
- Phil Bodger - additional production, mix (3) - remix (4) - producer, mix (8)
- Fortran 5 and Neil Arthur - producer (10)
