= Got a Love for You =

Single by Jomanda

from the album Someone to Love Me
- Released: June 17, 1991 (U.K)
- Genre: Dance-pop; house
- Length: 5:09 (Album version)
- Label: Big Beat (U.S.A); Giant; Warner Bros.
- Songwriters: Cheri Williams; Joel Washington; Dwayne "Spen" Richardson; Derek A. Jenkins; Cassio Ware
- Producers: Derek A. Jenkins; Dwayne "Spen" Richardson; Cassio Ware

Jomanda singles chronology
"Don't You Want My Love" (1989)	"Got a Love for You" (1991)	"I Like It" (1993)

Music video
- "Got a Love for You" on YouTube

"Got a Love for You" is a song recorded by American vocal trio Jomanda for their debut studio album, Someone to Love Me (1990). It was released as a single in 1991 by Big Beat, Giant and Warner Bros., and hit number one on the US Billboard Dance Club Songs chart for one week. The single also crossed over to the pop charts, becoming their only top 40 hit on the Billboard Hot 100. The single release included remixes from Eric Miller and Steve "Silk" Hurley.

"Got a Love for You" was sampled by South African singer Brenda Fassie on her song "Ngiyakusaba". A cover version was released in the summer of 2017 by Canadian-Armenian producer DerHova featuring vocals by Asmik Shiroyan.

== Critical reception ==
Larry Flick from Billboard magazine wrote, "This delicious jam takes the femme trio back to its deep house roots after a brief flirtation with urban radio. Of the six remixes, be sure to check out Steve "Silk" Hurley's and Eric Miller's versions, both of which emphasize rich harmonizing and spine-stirring percussion." Alan Jones from Music Week constated that produced by Hurley, "the glamorous trio from New Jersey will undoubtedly have a pop smash too with this irrestistible house groove." In 1997, he named it "one of the best dance records of the Nineties" and a "all-time anthem".

== Impact ==
"Got a Love for You" was ranked number 78 in Slant Magazine's list of the 100 Greatest Dance Songs of All Time in 2020.

== Track listing and formats ==
- US 12-inch vinyl single
1. Got a Love for You (Hurley's House Mix) – 7:34
2. Got a Love for You (Hurley's Dub) – 5:22
3. Got a Love for You (Hurley's Radio) – 5:24
4. Got a Love for You (Love Mix) – 6:02
5. Got a Love for You (Smoove Underground Mix) – 5:27
6. Got a Love for You (Extended Version) – 5:41
- European CD and UK 12-inch vinyl single
1. Got a Love for You (Edit) – 4:24
2. Got a Love for You (Hurley's House Mix) – 7:34
3. Got a Love for You (Smoove Underground Mix) – 5:27

== Charts ==
=== Weekly charts ===
Chart (1991)	Peak position
UK Singles (OCC)	43
UK Airplay (Music Week)	55
UK Dance (Music Week)	5
UK Club Chart (Record Mirror)	1
US Billboard Hot 100	40
US Dance Club Songs (Billboard)	1
US Hot R&B/Hip-Hop Songs (Billboard)	66
US Cash Box Top 100	54

=== Year-end charts ===
Chart (1991)	Position
UK Club Chart (Record Mirror)	25
