= Feels Like Heaven (Urban Cookie Collective song) =

1993 single by Urban Cookie Collective

Single by Urban Cookie Collective

from the album High on a Happy Vibe
- Released: 1 November 1993
- Genre: Eurodance
- Length: 3:29
- Label: Pulse-8
- Songwriter: Rohan Heath
- Producer: Rohan Heath

Urban Cookie Collective singles chronology
"The Key the Secret" (1993)	"Feels Like Heaven" (1993)	"Sail Away" (1994)

Music video
- "Feels Like Heaven" on YouTube

"Feels Like Heaven" is a song by British dance music band Urban Cookie Collective, released on 1 November 1993 by Pulse-8 Records as the second single from their debut album, High on a Happy Vibe (1994). As the follow-up to "The Key the Secret", it was both written and produced by Rohan Heath, and peaked at number five on the UK Singles Chart, staying in the chart for nine consecutive weeks. The vocals were by Diane Charlemagne, who had provided the vocal for the band's previous hit and their subsequent singles. Its accompanying music video was directed by Lindy Heymann.

== Critical reception ==
Upon the release, Andy Beevers from Music Week gave "Feels Like Heaven" a full score of five out of five, writing, "The follow-up to 'The Key the Secret' unsurprisingly sticks to pretty much the same infectious upbeat house formula. It should not have much trouble following its predecessor into the Top 40, although it may not reach the same dizzy heights." The Record Mirror Dance Update named it a "bright and catchy sequel". Alex Kadis from Smash Hits gave the song two out of five, viewing it as "a sure-fire hit to follow their No 2 triumph". She also noted its "uplifting vocals and prerequisite soaring backbeat". Another Smash Hits editor, Mark Frith, complimented it as a "corking" single.

== Chart performance ==
In Europe, "Feels Like Heaven" entered the top 10 in Belgium, Ireland, the Netherlands, and Switzerland, peaking at number nine in all four countries. The song was also a top-10 hit in the United Kingdom, where it peaked at number five during its second week on the UK Singles Chart, on 14 November 1993. It spent a total of nine weeks within the UK top 100. On the Music Week Dance Singles chart, it reached number three, while peaking at number 22 on the Record Mirror Club Chart.

Additionally, "Feels Like Heaven" was a top-20 hit in Austria, Denmark, Finland, Germany and Sweden. In Germany, the single debuted at number 50 before peaking six weeks later and spending 16 weeks inside the Media Control chart. On the Eurochart Hot 100, "Feels Like Heaven" peaked at number 17 on 15 January 1994, after debuting at number 37 in November 1993 from its UK sales alone. On the European Dance Radio Chart, it rose to number one for three weeks. In North America, "Feels Like Heaven" peaked at numbers four and 19 on Canada's RPM Dance chart and The Record Retail Singles chart, respectively. In Oceania, it peaked at number 10 in Australia and number 47 in New Zealand. In West Asia, the song became a top-10 hit in Israel, peaking at number nine on 30 November 1993.

== Music video ==
The music video for "Feels Like Heaven" was directed by British director Lindy Heymann, featuring the band performing on the beach. It received active rotation on MTV Europe in January 1994. One month later, it was B-listed on German music television channel VIVA.

== Track listings ==
- 7-inch single, UK (1993)
1. "Feels Like Heaven" (Maximum Edit) – 3:29
2. "Feels Like Heaven" (Maximum Mix) – 3:47
- 12-inch single, UK (1993)
1. "Feels Like Heaven" (Extended to the Max Mix) – 5:56
2. "Feels Like Heaven" (A Maximum Dub Development) – 5:58
3. "Feels Like Heaven" (Kamoflage Club Mix) – 5:58
4. "Feels Like Heaven" (Kamoflage Dub) – 6:34
- CD single, UK (1993)
1. "Feels Like Heaven" (Maximum Edit) – 3:29
2. "Feels Like Heaven" (Maximum Mix) – 3:47
3. "Feels Like Heaven" (Swing That Bass Mix) – 5:12
4. "Feels Like Heaven" (Extended to the Max Mix) – 5:56
5. "Feels Like Heaven" (A Maximum Dub Development) – 5:58
6. "Feels Like Heaven" (Kamoflage Club Mix) – 5:58
7. "Feels Like Heaven" (Kamoflage Dub) – 6:34

== Charts ==
=== Weekly charts ===
Chart (1993–1994)	Peak position
Australia (ARIA)	10
Austria (Ö3 Austria Top 40)	11
Belgium (Ultratop 50 Flanders)	9
Canada Retail Singles (The Record)	19
Canada Dance/Urban (RPM)	4
Europe (Eurochart Hot 100)	17
Europe (European Dance Radio)	1
Europe (European Hit Radio)	26
Finland (IFPI)	13
Germany (GfK)	12
Ireland (IRMA)	9
Israel (Israeli Singles Chart)	9
Italy (Musica e dischi)	24
Netherlands (Dutch Top 40)	9
Netherlands (Single Top 100)	12
New Zealand (Recorded Music NZ)	47
Sweden (Sverigetopplistan)	17
Switzerland (Schweizer Hitparade)	9
UK Singles (Official Charts)	5
UK Airplay (Music Week)	7
UK Dance (Music Week)	3
UK Club Chart (Music Week)	22
UK Indie (Music Week)	1

=== Year-end charts ===
Chart (1993)	Position
Netherlands (Dutch Top 40)	164
UK Singles (OCC)	80

Chart (1994)	Position
Australia (ARIA)	75
Belgium (Ultratop 50 Flanders)	95
Canada Dance/Urban (RPM)	47
Europe (Eurochart Hot 100)	90
Germany (Media Control)	89
Netherlands (Dutch Top 40)	141

== Certifications ==
Region	Certification	Certified units/sales
Australia (ARIA)	Gold	35,000^{^}
^{^} Shipments figures based on certification alone.

== Release history ==
Region	Date	Format(s)	Label(s)	Ref.
United Kingdom	1 November 1993	7-inch vinyl; 12-inch vinyl; CD; cassette	Pulse-8	
Australia	6 December 1993	CD; cassette	Liberation; Pulse-8	
Australia	10 January 1994	12-inch vinyl	Liberation; Pulse-8	
