= It Will Make Me Crazy =

1992 single by Felix

Single by Felix

from the album #1
- Released: 12 October 1992
- Genre: Progressive house; hardcore techno
- Length: 3:50
- Label: Deconstruction
- Songwriter: Felix
- Producer: Felix

Felix singles chronology
"Don't You Want Me" (1992)	"It Will Make Me Crazy" (1992)	"Stars" (1993)

Music video
- "It Will Make Me Crazy" on YouTube

"It Will Make Me Crazy" is a song by British DJ and producer Francis Wright, known under the pseudonym of Felix. It was released in October 1992 by Deconstruction Records, as the second single from his debut album, #1 (1993), and features vocalist Steele, also known as Sam Brown. The song, both written and produced by Felix, topped the chart in Finland and reached the top-5 in Switzerland, Ireland and Germany. Additionally, it was also a top-10 hit in Austria, Belgium, Denmark, the Netherlands, Sweden and Switzerland. In the UK, it peaked at number 11 and on the Eurochart Hot 100, it reached number seven. Outside Europe, the single peaked at number 14 in Israel and number 55 in Australia. Its accompanying music video was directed by Lindy Heymann.

== Critical reception ==
Ben Turner from Melody Maker complimented the song's "delicious, disco frenzy mix", adding, "Anyone who heard this in Club For Life for the first time will remember the mayhem that followed." Tim Southwell from Smash Hits commented, "Not quite as catchy as previous smash 'Don't You Want Me', but play it extremely loud and you won't be able to hold yourself back. It's ravey, it's manic and it's getting people dancing like mad things from Putney to Prestwick."

== Music video ==
A partially black-and-white music video was produced to promote the single, directed by British director Lindy Heymann. It features singer Steele and dancers performing in a basement. The video received heavy rotation on MTV Europe in January 1993 and was later made available on Felix' official YouTube channel in 2012. It had generated more than 1.5 million views as of October 2025.

== Track listings ==
- 7-inch single, Europe (1992)
1. "It Will Make Me Crazy" (edit) – 3:50
2. "It Will Make Me Crazy" (Red Jelly edit) – 3:30
- 12-inch, UK (1992)
1. "It Will Make Me Crazy" (Big mix)
2. "It Will Make Me Crazy" (Felix's piano mix)
3. "It Will Make Me Crazy" (Red Jelly mix)
4. "It Will Make Me Crazy" (Mmmm mix)
- CD single, Europe (1992)
1. "It Will Make Me Crazy" (edit) – 3:52
2. "It Will Make Me Crazy" (Big mix) – 5:55
3. "It Will Make Me Crazy" (Felix's piano mix) – 4:51
4. "It Will Make Me Crazy" (Red Jelly mix) – 6:05
5. "It Will Make Me Crazy" (Mmmm mix) – 5:41
- CD maxi, Europe (1992)
1. "It Will Make Me Crazy" (edit) – 3:50
2. "It Will Make Me Crazy" (Big mix) – 5:54
3. "It Will Make Me Crazy" (Felix's piano mix) – 4:49
4. "It Will Make Me Crazy" (Red Jelly mix) – 6:02

== Charts ==
=== Weekly charts ===
Chart (1992–1993)	Peak position
Australia (ARIA)	55
Austria (Ö3 Austria Top 40)	8
Belgium (Ultratop Flanders)	6
Denmark (IFPI)	9
Europe (Eurochart Hot 100)	7
Europe (European Dance Radio)	11
Finland (Suomen virallinen lista)	1
Germany (Media Control)	5
Ireland (IRMA)	4
Israel (Israeli Singles Chart)	14
Italy (Musica e dischi)	18
Netherlands (Dutch Top 40)	8
Netherlands (Single Top 100)	9
Sweden (Topplistan)	6
Switzerland (Schweizer Hitparade)	3
UK Singles (OCC)	11
UK Dance (Music Week)	3
UK Club Chart (Music Week)	4

=== Year-end charts ===
Chart (1992)	Position
Netherlands (Dutch Top 40)	81

Chart (1993)	Position
Europe (Eurochart Hot 100)	79
Germany (Media Control)	64
Sweden (Topplistan)	64
Switzerland (Schweizer Hitparade)	38
