= One Day, One Time =

Single by Neil Arthur

from the album Suitcase
- B-side: "Going Round in Triangles"
- Released: 5 October 1992
- Length: 3:33
- Label: Chrysalis
- Songwriters: Neil Arthur; Rick Kenton
- Producer: Phil Bodger

Neil Arthur singles chronology
"One Day, One Time" (1992)	"I Love I Hate" (1994)

"One Day, One Time" is a song by the English singer and musician Neil Arthur, released by Chrysalis as his debut solo single on 5 October 1992 and included on Arthur's debut solo studio album Suitcase in 1994. The song was written by Arthur and Rick Kenton, and produced by Phil Bodger. It reached number 80 in the UK Singles Chart.

== Background ==
"One Day, One Time" was Neil Arthur's debut solo single and his first release of new pop material since the split of Blancmange, the synth-pop duo he formed with Stephen Luscombe. After the duo's split in 1986, Arthur stepped away from the pop music scene and concentrated on writing music for film, TV and radio. Speaking of his return to pop music, he told Simon Mayo in 1992, "It's six years, but it seems like two minutes to me."

"One Day, One Time" failed to enter the top 75 of the UK Singles Chart, stalling at number 80, but it was a radio hit. It was chosen as Chris Evans' single of the week on BBC Radio 1 and peaked at number 40 on the Music Week Top 50 Airplay Chart in October 1992. In a 2022 interview with Electronic Sound, Arthur stated that the single was not properly distributed to retailers. He recalled, "I think the radio interest in the record must have taken the label slightly by surprise. They didn't have the stock in the shops to take advantage of it and that was that. Your moment's gone and it was back to the film music for me, but I didn't mind."

== Promotion ==
A music video was filmed to promote the single and was featured on ITV's The Chart Show.

== Critical reception ==
Upon its release, Alan Jones of Music Week described "One Day, One Time" was "a slightly deranged track that recalls, both vocally and in worldly influences, Talking Heads' David Byrne, as well as the Thompson Twins". He believed it "could be a surprise hit". Jim Lawn of The Lennox Herald considered it to be a "breezy pop song" and also believed it would be a hit. The Accrington Observer was negative in their review, awarding the single a one out of five star rating. The reviewer felt that the "only saving grace" of the song is the "instrumental opening which could pass for the beginning of a Big Country track". They added, "It sadly lacks originality, is totally unmemorable and becomes aggravating towards the end. Ex-Blancmange man Arthur's day and time is a long way off." In 2012, the song was included in a feature by The Electricity Club covering "30 lost songs of the CD era". Writer Barry Page described it as "engaging" and noted that it was "not a radical departure from Blancmange's musical template".

== Formats ==
7-inch and cassette single

1. "One Day, One Time" – 3:33
2. "Going Round in Triangles" – 3:30

12-inch single

1. "One Day, One Time" (Bone O' Fido Mix) – 5:09
2. "One Day, One Time" (Nil By Mouth Mix) – 4:34
3. "One Day, One Time" (Rome Wasn't Built...Mix) – 7:06
4. "One Day, One Time" (7" Mix) – 3:33

CD single

1. "One Day, One Time" (7" Mix) – 3:33
2. "One Day, One Time" (Bone O' Fido Mix) – 5:09
3. "Going Round in Triangles" – 3:30
4. "Laughing in the Rain" – 4:00

== Personnel ==
"One Day, One Time"

- Neil Arthur – vocals
- Tracy Ackerman – backing vocals
- Graham Henderson – keyboards
- David Rhodes – guitar
- Pascal Benadjaoud – congas

"Going Round in Triangles" and "Laughing in the Rain"

- Neil Arthur – vocals
- Mike Cozzi – guitar

Production

- Phil Bodger – production, engineering and mixing ("One Day, One Time")
- Marius de Vries – programming ("One Day, One Time")
- Neil Arthur – production and engineering ("Going Round in Triangles", "Laughing in the Rain")

Other

- Richard V. Smith – photography

== Charts ==
Chart (1992)	Peak position
UK Singles Chart (OCC)	80
UK Music Week Top 50 Airplay Chart	40
