= The Lady in Waiting =

1992 American short film

- Directed by: Christian M. Taylor
- Written by: Christian M. Taylor
- Produced by: Jim Frohna; Jane Miller
- Starring: Virginia McKenna; Rodney Hudson
- Cinematography: Joaquín Baca-Asay
- Edited by: Christian M. Taylor
- Music by: Rosalie Coopman
- Release date: January 1992
- Running time: 28 minutes
- Country: United States
- Language: English

The Lady in Waiting is a 1992 short film written and directed by Christian M. Taylor and starring Virginia McKenna as Miss Peach, an elderly woman living alongside her drag queen neighbor Scarlet in a New York apartment, played by Rodney Hudson, who unexpectedly bond during a blackout.

== Cast ==
- Virginia McKenna as Miss Peach
- Rodney Hudson as Scarlet, a drag queen
- Beth McGee-Russell as Sarah
- Emma Wilson as Chambermaid

== Reception ==
The Lady in Waiting, which was Taylor’s thesis film for New York University, won the Student Academy Award Gold Medal for a Narrative, and was nominated for the Academy Award for Best Live Action Short Film at the 65th Academy Awards ceremony.

Director Christian Taylor had been hoping to turn this short into a feature film, with a full synopsis and even a cast listing found on Sundance Film Festival’s website. Priscilla Pointer and Courtney B. Vance had been eyed to play Ms. Peach and Scarlet, respectively. The feature film never got made.

In a retrospective 2023 review on PinkNews by Aysia Iftikhar, the film is praised for its progressive themes and depiction of two unlikely foes forming a unique friendship, with Iftikhar writing: "It made history as one of a handful of LGBTQ+ themed films to ever be nominated in the best live-action short category at the Academy Awards; and despite being largely forgotten in pop culture, it’s undoubtedly a hidden gem."
