= Don't You Want Me (Felix song) =

1992 single by Felix

Single by Felix

from the album #1
- B-side: "Don't You Want Me" (original mix)
- Released: 27 July 1992
- Genre: Hardbag, techno (Hooj mix); house (original mix)
- Length: 3:10 (single version); 4:01 (album version)
- Label: Deconstruction; RCA
- Songwriters: Francis Wright; Cheri Renee Williams; Joanne Yvonne Thomas; Renee Washington; Cassio Ware; Derek A. Jenkins; Dwayne "Spen" Richardson; Paul Scott
- Producers: Felix; Rollo and Red Jerry (remix)

Felix singles chronology
"Don't You Want Me" (1992)	"It Will Make Me Crazy" (1992)

Music video
- "Don't You Want Me" on YouTube

"Don't You Want Me" is a song recorded by British DJ and producer Francis Wright, known under the pseudonym of Felix, released in July 1992 as his debut single from his album, #1 (1993). Musically, it samples Jomanda's "Don't You Want My Love" and credited as Felix featuring Jomanda (remixed by Rollo and Red Jerry). Released on 27 July 1992 by various labels, the song reached number six on the UK Singles Chart reached number one in Finland, Spain, and Switzerland. It also went to number one on the US Billboard Hot Dance Club Play chart. In 1995 and 1996, the song charted in the UK again, but in remixed form. British clubbing magazine Mixmag ranked the song number 98 in its "100 Greatest Dance Singles of All Time" list in 1996.

== Background and release ==
Felix was born in Chelmsford, Essex and at the age of 15 he decided to create his own music. He began getting involved with DJing, and after a handful of releases, his track "Don't You Want Me" was released in 1992. It sampled Jomanda's "Don't You Want My Love", which was remixed by Rollo and Red Jerry. The production process with the track was very quick. Felix had done a demo version, which was like a piano based kind of thing. It was structured like music by Steve "Silk" Hurley and the house sound at that time. He sent it to independent label Hooj Choons, which asked him to come up with an alternative version. That was when he came up with the version which had the organ sound. Felix recorded it in a studio in Essex Road in London, and the whole thing was done within a day and a night.

After the release, it did well in the clubs and some of the underground clubs. Pet Shop Boys did a hosting session on Radio One, got hold of the record and played it all the time. Deconstruction heard it and they decided to sign it to the label. They promoted the track and made the single big. It is now largely considered to be the track that launched the hardbag explosion. "Don't You Want Me" appears on the compilation The Best Dance Album in the World... Ever! in remixed form, and was used in the episode "New Girl" of the TV series The Office. It was also famously featured in St George, a 1996 Tango Blackcurrant advertisement for television. On the single re-release, which features the version from the advert which also samples dialogue from the advert, the Tango Blackcurrant logo even appears several times on the artwork.

== Critical reception ==
Upon the release of the 1992 version, Larry Flick from Billboard magazine found that "requisite harsh synths are tempered with a retro, Giorgio Moroder-esque electro-beat". A reviewer from Music & Media wrote about the 1995 remix, "In the Deconstruction Classic series, here's Patrick Prins' remix interpretation of Felix's 1992 dance hit. It's much heavier now with souped up sequencers and percussion." British magazine Music Week described the first version as a "hand-waving progressive house anthem". Kris Needs from NME remarked its "nuclear-fuelled muscle riff", commenting, "Described as 'the keyboard riff from hell, once heard it can't be dislodged', I swear the middle breakdown where the girl comes back with that 'don'tyawantmalove?' was going to spark mass levitation at Nottingham Venus! James Hamilton from the Record Mirror Dance Update declared it as a "distinctive organ/synth driven" track.

== Impact and legacy ==
"Don't You Want Me" won the 1992 DMC/Mixmag Awards in the category of Best House Record at the Royal Albert Hall.

British hardhouse and trance music record producer Jon the Dentist named it one of his favourites in 1995, adding, "When this came out we finally got some technoey sounds back after two years of drongo discoey sounds. It was how I got into hardcore. Felix was a groundbreaker, he finally got the house back on its track."

Clubbing magazine Mixmag ranked the song number 98 in its "100 Greatest Dance Singles Of All Time" list in 1996 and included it in their "The Biggest Drops in Dance Music" in 2020. They wrote, "Its neon stabs perfect for cutting shapes to in a field or warehouse wherever dance music was taking hold and kicking off. It soups up Jomanda's vocal and launches into a universe of smiley faces, baggy fits and getting home at breakfast time."

== Track listings ==
- 12-inch maxi
1. "Don't You Want Me" (Hooj Mix) – 5:58
2. "Don't You Want Me" (Red Jerry's Holiday Mix) – 4:39
3. "Don't You Want Me" (Fierce Mix) – 5:07
- 12-inch maxi
1. "Don't You Want Me" (Hooj Mix) – 5:58
2. "Don't You Want Me" (Original) – 4:43
3. "Yes You Do" – 4:47
- 7-inch and CD single
1. "Don't You Want Me" (Hooj Mix Edit) – 3:11
2. "Don't You Want Me" (Original Mix) – 4:53
- CD maxi
1. "Don't You Want Me" (Hooj Mix Edit) – 3:11
2. "Don't You Want Me" (Hooj Mix) – 5:58
3. "Don't You Want Me" (Red Jerry's Holiday Mix) – 4:39
4. "Don't You Want Me" (Fierce Mix) – 5:07
- CD maxi
1. "Don't You Want Me" (Hooj Mix Edit) – 3:11
2. "Don't You Want Me" (Hooj Mix) – 5:58
3. "Don't You Want Me" (Original Mix) – 4:53
4. "Don't You Want Me" (Red Jerry's Holiday Mix) – 4:40
5. "Don't You Want Me" (Fierce Mix) – 5:06
- Cassette
1. "Don't You Want Me" (Hooj Mix Edit)
2. "Don't You Want Me" (Original Mix)
3. "Don't You Want Me" (Hooj Mix Edit)
4. "Don't You Want Me" (Original Mix)
- CD maxi – 1995 remixes
1. "Don't You Want Me (Patrick Prins Remix Edit) – 3:23
2. "Don't You Want Me (Hooj Mix Edit) – 3:11
3. "Don't You Want Me (Patrick Prins Remix) – 6:17
4. "Don't You Want Me (Hooj Mix) – 5:53
5. "Don't You Want Me (DJ Professor Mix) – 7:54
6. "Don't You Want Me (Candy Girls Remix) – 7:30
- 12-inch maxi – 1995 remixes
1. "Don't You Want Me" (Patrick Prins Remix) – 6:17
2. "Don't You Want Me" (Candy Girls Remix) – 7:30
3. "Don't You Want Me" (Hooj Mix) – 5:53
4. "Don't You Want Me" (DJ Professor Mix) – 7:54
- CD maxi – 1996 remixes
1. "Don't You Want Me" (Remix '96 Pugilist Mix) – 3:40
2. "Stars" (Felix Mix Edit) – 3:37
3. "It Will Make Me Crazy" (Big Mix Edit) – 3:52
4. "Don't You Want Me" (Hooj Mix) – 5:58
- Digital download – 2015 remixes
1. "Don't You Want Me" (Dimitri Vegas & Like Mike remix) – 5:07
2. "Don't You Want Me" (Atjazz remix) – 6:35
3. "Don't You Want Me" (Brodanse Bass Hall remix) – 6:35
- Digital download – Timmy Trumpet remix
1. "Don't You Want Me" (Timmy Trumpet x Felix) – 4:21
- Digital download – KI/KI remix
1. "Don't You Want Me" (KI/KI Remix) – 5:25

== Charts ==
=== Weekly charts ===
Chart (1992–1993)	Peak position
Australia (ARIA)	17
Austria (Ö3 Austria Top 40)	3
Belgium (Ultratop 50 Flanders)	3
Denmark (IFPI)	10
Europe (Eurochart Hot 100)	2
Europe (European Dance Radio)	2
Finland (Suomen virallinen lista)	1
France (SNEP)	4
Germany (GfK)	2
Greece (Pop + Rock)	2
Ireland (IRMA)	7
Israel (Israeli Singles Chart)	11
Italy (Musica e dischi)	2
Netherlands (Dutch Top 40)	3
Netherlands (Single Top 100)	3
Norway (VG-lista)	5
Portugal (AFP)	2
Spain (AFYVE)	1
Sweden (Sverigetopplistan)	4
Switzerland (Schweizer Hitparade)	1
UK Singles (Official Charts)	6
UK Airplay (Music Week)	29
UK Dance (Music Week)	1
UK Club Chart (Music Week)	11
US Bubbling Under Hot 100 (Billboard)	10
US Dance Club Songs (Billboard)	1
US Dance Singles Sales (Billboard)	13

Chart (1995)	Peak position
Finland (Suomen virallinen lista)	16
Ireland (IRMA) 1995 remixes	19
Scottish Singles Sales (Official Charts) 1995 remixes	15
UK Singles (Official Charts) 1995 remixes	10
UK Dance (Official Charts) 1995 remixes	2
UK Pop Tip Club Chart (Music Week)	24

Chart (1996)	Peak position
Europe (Eurochart Hot 100)	71
Scottish Singles Sales (Official Charts) 1996 remixes	14
UK Singles (Official Charts) 1996 remixes	17

=== Year-end charts ===
Chart (1992)	Position
Australia (ARIA)	90
Belgium (Ultratop)	29
Europe (Eurochart Hot 100)	22
Europe (European Dance Radio)	6
Germany (Media Control)	23
Netherlands (Dutch Top 40)	27
Netherlands (Single Top 100)	23
Sweden (Topplistan)	19
UK Singles (OCC)	33
UK Club Chart (Music Week)	36

Chart (1993)	Position
Europe (Eurochart Hot 100)	53
Germany (Media Control)	91
Switzerland (Schweizer Hitparade)	34
US Dance Club Play (Billboard)	6

== Certifications ==
Region	Certification	Certified units/sales
France (SNEP)	Silver	125,000^{*}
Germany (BVMI)	Gold	250,000^{^}
United Kingdom (BPI)	Silver	200,000^{‡}
^{*} Sales figures based on certification alone.^{^} Shipments figures based on certification alone.^{‡} Sales+streaming figures based on certification alone.

== Release history ==
Region	Version	Date	Format(s)	Label(s)	Ref.
United Kingdom	Hooj mix	27 July 1992	7-inch vinyl; 12-inch vinyl; CD; cassette	Deconstruction; RCA	
Australia	Hooj mix	24 August 1992	12-inch vinyl; CD; cassette	Deconstruction; RCA	
United Kingdom	Patrick Prins remix	31 July 1995	12-inch vinyl; CD; cassette	Deconstruction	
United Kingdom	'96 Pugilist mix	7 October 1996	CD; cassette	Deconstruction	
