= Jomanda (group) =

US girl group

- Origin: New Jersey, United States
- Genres: House
- Years active: 1988–1994
- Label: Big Beat/Atlantic
- Past members: Cheri Williams; Joanne Thomas (deceased); Renee Washington

Jomanda was an American female house music vocal trio from New Jersey. Members included Joanne Thomas, Cheri Williams, and Renee Washington.

== Biography ==
The group name Jomanda was created by combining the names of the two original members, Joanne Thomas and Amanda Askins. After the group was formed, Cheri Williams joined the group. Later, when Amanda chose not to sign the contract, she was replaced by Renee Washington.

Jomanda had several hits on the US Billboard Hot Dance Club Play chart during the first half of the 1990s, including "Got a Love for You," which reached No. 1 in 1991. The song also crossed over to the mainstream, going top 40 (peaking at No. 40) on the US Billboard Hot 100.

In 1993, the trio returned to No. 1 on the dance chart with "Don't You Want My Love", a track credited to Felix featuring Jomanda.

The song "Make My Body Rock" appeared in Dance! Online, a multiplayer online casual rhythm game, and in Grand Theft Auto: San Andreas.

=== Joanne Thomas' death ===
Group member Joanne Thomas died in October 2003, after a three-year battle with colon cancer.

== Discography ==
=== Albums ===
- 1986: On Top (of The Groove) (ACE BEAT Records); (First release)
- 1990: Someone to Love Me (Big Beat/Atlantic Records)
- 1993: Nubia Soul (Big Beat/Atlantic Records)

=== Singles ===
As lead artist

Year	Single	Peak chart positions				Album
Year	Single	US	US Dance	US R&B	UK	Album
1988	"Make My Body Rock (Feel It)"	—	6	—	44	Someone to Love Me
1989	"Don't You Want My Love"	—	10	—	79	Someone to Love Me
1991	"Got a Love for You"	40	1	66	43	Someone to Love Me
1992	"The True Meaning of Love"	—	7	—	—	Someone to Love Me
1993	"I Like It"	83	29	43	67	Nubia Soul
1993	"Back to You"	—	—	96	—	Nubia Soul
1993	"Never"	—	—	—	40	Nubia Soul
1994	"I Cried the Tears"	—	15	—	—	Nubia Soul

As featured artist

Year	Single	Peak chart positions											Certifications (sales thresholds)	Album
Year	Single	UK	AUS	AUT	BEL (FLA)	FIN	GER	IRE	NED	NOR	SWE	SWI	Certifications (sales thresholds)	Album
1992	"Don't You Want Me" (Felix feat. Jomanda)	6	17	3	3	1	2	7	3	5	4	1	FRA: Silver; GER: Gold	#1

== See also ==
- List of number-one dance hits (United States)
- List of artists who reached number one on the US Dance chart
