= Molly Half Head =

- Origin: Manchester, England
- Genres: Alternative rock
- Years active: 1992–1996, 2021
- Labels: Playtime, Columbia
- Past members: Paul Bardsley; Phil Murphy; Neil Daly; Andy Pickering; Graham Atkinson

Molly Half Head were an alternative rock band from Manchester formed in 1992. They had a minor UK hit single in 1995 with "Shine".

== History ==
The band's line-up, after an early experimental version of the band that included a saxophonist, comprised Paul Bardsley (vocals), Phil Murphy (guitar), Neil Daly (bass guitar), and Andy Pickering (drums). They were compared to bands such as Magazine, with Bardsley often likened to Mark E. Smith. They signed for Manchester independent label Playtime Records, and released their debut single, "Taste of You", in March 1993;. Two more singles followed before the release of the album Sulk in November 1993. The album was issued in the United States in February 1994 by Columbia Records. Daly left the band and was replaced by Graham Atkinson, and the band left Playtime to sign for Columbia in the UK. The band's second single for Columbia, "Shine", reached number 73 in the UK Singles Chart. A second album, Dunce, produced by Craig Leon and released in July 1995, failed to achieve commercial success saw the band dropped by Columbia and they subsequently split up.

Bardsley and Murphy later formed Wireless (not to be confused with the Canadian band of the same name), releasing a self-titled album in 1998.

There were rumours of a comeback in 2021 with an appearance at the Shiiine on Weekender being announced However Molly Halfhead didn't play at the festival.

== Discography ==
=== Albums ===
- Sulk (1993), Playtime/Columbia
- Dunce (1995), Columbia

=== Singles ===
- "Taste of You" (1993), Playtime
- "Just" (1993), Playtime
- "Barny" (1993), Playtime
- "Breaking the Ice" (1995), Columbia - UK No. 80
- "Shine" (1995), Columbia - UK No. 73
