= Felix (music producer) =

British producer and DJ

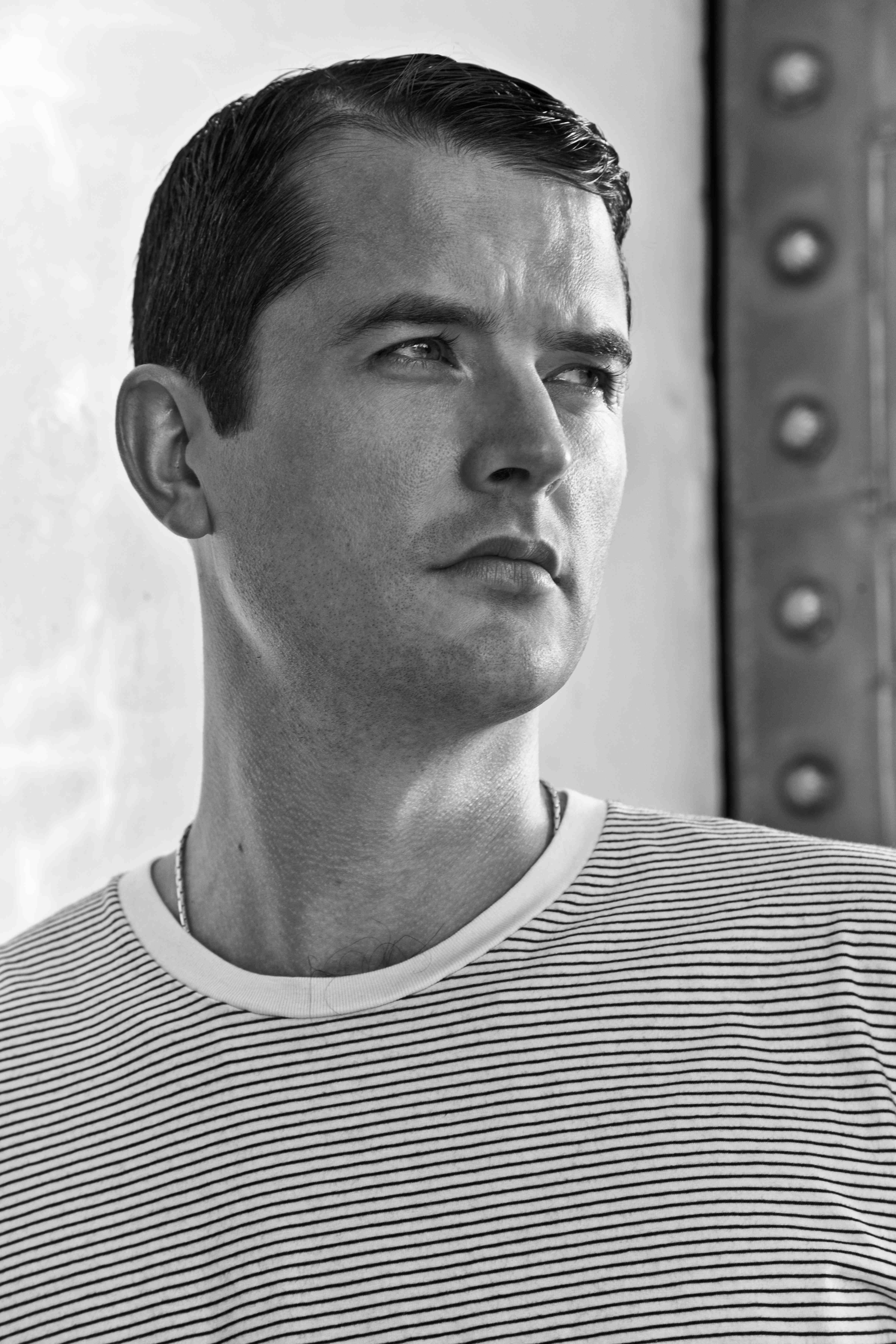
- FELIX in Los Angeles 2012

Background information
- Born: Francis Reuben Wright
- Origin: Chelmsford, Essex, England
- Genres: House, dance
- Occupations: Producer, DJ
- Years active: 1992–present

Francis Reuben Wright, known professionally as Felix, is a British producer and DJ. He is known for his hit singles "Don't You Want Me" and "It Will Make Me Crazy", which was featured on his only album, #1 (1993), and his underground house project "The Party Crashers".

== Life and career ==
Felix was born in Chelmsford, Essex. His passion for music began early with a love of Soul & Funk from the "Street Sounds" compilations and the House Sound of Chicago. At the age of 15, after exploring a brief interest in Hip Hop, he decided to create his own music and began getting involved with DJing.

After a handful of releases, Felix's 1992 track "Don't You Want Me" changed his career. In an interview with AXS celebrating the track's 23 year release, Felix said he "was working a 9-to-5 job when the song first came out. It was just such a massive, massive hit. It caught a lot of people off guard and it changed [his] life completely because [he] jumped into it full-time... making music, then touring, DJing, and producing." The track, which sampled Jomanda's "Don't You Want My Love" (remixed by Rollo and Red Jerry), went to number one on the Billboard European Hot 100 Singles and Hot Dance Music/Club Play charts. It also reached number 6 in the UK Singles Chart in 1992. A remix of the song,"Don't You Want Me: Pugilist Mix", formed the soundtrack to the 1996 TV commercial for Blackcurrant Tango. "Don't You Want Me" was also sampled by David Guetta and Snoop Dogg on their collaboration "Wet" in 2011.

Writing in 2000, music historian Colin Larkin commented that Felix "represented something of an enigma – never talking to the press or appearing in his videos. He even took the stage at the DMC awards sporting a lion suit. However, his anonymity was not helped by the massive success of singles like 'Don't You Want Me' and 'It Will Make Me Crazy', which sold nearly two million copies between them worldwide. Both predicted the rise of trance and hard house."

"Don't You Want Me" was sampled by Meck in 2007, to provide the majority of the music for his single, "Feels Like Home". In 2008, Madonna used elements of Meck's version during "Like a Prayer" on the Sticky & Sweet Tour.

Other UK charting singles for Felix included "It Will Make Me Crazy" and "Stars".

"Don't You Want Me 2015" was released on Armada Music on 13 April 2015 and included five new mixes: "Classic", "Turbo", "Dimitri Vegas & Like Mike", "Atjazz Club" and "Brodanse Bass Hall".

In 2015, Felix launched his new label "DANCE FX" and all sales from his release of "Reaching for the top" were donated to the David Lynch Foundation.

== Discography ==
=== Albums ===
- 1993: #1 – UK #26, AUS #124, AUT #24, GER #76, NED #86, SWE #45, SWI #29

=== Singles ===
Year	Single	Peak chart positions												Certifications (sales thresholds)	Album
Year	Single	UK	AUS	AUT	BEL (FLA)	EUR	FIN	GER	IRE	NED	NOR	SWE	SWI	Certifications (sales thresholds)	Album
1992	"Don't You Want Me"	6	17	3	3	1	1	2	7	3	5	4	1	FRA: Silver; GER: Gold	#1
1992	"It Will Make Me Crazy"	11	55	8	6	7	1	5	4	9	—	6	3		#1
1993	"Stars"	29	100	—	31	63	—	—	16	—	—	—	—		#1
1993	"Fastslow/It's Me" (promotional only)	—	—	—	—	—	—	—	—	—	—	—	—		#1
1994	"Get Down" (promotional only)	—	—	—	—	—	—	—	—	—	—	—	—		Singles only
1995	"Don't You Want Me" (Patrick Prins remix)	10	—	—	—	—	16	—	19	—	—	—	—		Singles only
1996	"Don't You Want Me" ('96 Pugilist mix)	17	—	—	—	—	—	—	—	—	—	—	—		Singles only
2015	"Reaching for the Top"	—	—	—	—	—	—	—	—	—	—	—	—		Singles only
2016	"Give You My Heart"	—	—	—	—	—	—	—	—	—	—	—	—		Singles only
2016	"Golden" feat. SJae	—	—	—	—	—	—	—	—	—	—	—	—		Singles only
2017	"Nothin More I Need" feat. Brendan Reilly	—	—	—	—	—	—	—	—	—	—	—	—		Singles only
2017	"Boom, Boom, Boom" (with Rrotik)	—	—	—	—	—	—	—	—	—	—	—	—		Singles only
2016	"F*ck That (Keep It Real)"	—	—	—	—	—	—	—	—	—	—	—	—		
2017	"Fuego Hot"	—	—	—	—	—	—	—	—	—	—	—	—		
2018	"Don't You Want Me" (Robert Feelgood & Luca DeBonaire Remix)	—	—	—	—	—	—	—	—	—	—	—	—		
2019	"Panic Mode" (with Salvador Santana)	—	—	—	—	—	—	—	—	—	—	—	—		
"—" denotes releases that did not chart

== See also ==
- List of number-one dance hits (United States)
- List of artists who reached number one on the US Dance chart
- List of notable house music artists and releases
