= The Key the Secret =

1993 single by Urban Cookie Collective

- Standard artwork for original 1993 release

Single by Urban Cookie Collective

from the album High on a Happy Vibe
- Released: 28 June 1993
- Genre: Eurodance
- Length: 3:40
- Label: Pulse 8
- Songwriter: Rohan Heath
- Producer: Chapter

Urban Cookie Collective singles chronology
"Lucky Stars" (1992)	"The Key the Secret" (1993)	"Feels Like Heaven" (1993)

Music video
- "The Key the Secret" on YouTube

"The Key the Secret" is a song by British group Urban Cookie Collective, released in June 1993 by Pulse 8 from the group's debut album, High on a Happy Vibe (1994). The song features vocals by British singer Diane Charlemagne and peaked at number one in the Netherlands. It was a top-5 hit also in Australia, Belgium, Germany, Ireland, and the UK, where it reached number two. Its music video was directed by Lindy Heymann, featuring the group in an indoor botanical garden. The song has been remixed several times.

== Background and release ==
"The Key the Secret" was originally a track written at home by group member Rohan Heath in a soul and hip hop vein. It was released on the tiny Unheard Records label. After a subsequent re-mix provoked a massive club response it was picked up by the Pulse 8 record label and released on 28 June 1993.

Italian Bologna-based Expanded Records gets credit for the hook on the track as they discovered that one of their own tracks had the same riff. MD Giovanni Natale of Expanded Records told Billboard magazine in October 1994, "When we pointed out to their U.K. record label, Pulse-8, that the Urban Cookie Collective's riff was the same as the one from out project Glam's release 'House Party', we came to an amicable agreement on rights with their publisher, peermusic, who behaved like gentlemen over the matter."

== Critical reception ==
"It pretty much came off the top of my head. I've always had a real interest in songwriting and it just happened to be at the better end of a million ideas I had. I tend to put one hand on my keyboard, play a chord and see what comes out of my mouth. 'The Key The Secret' was actually about taking magic mushrooms, which a lot of people never really realised at the time."

— Rohan Heath talking about how the song was made.

British DJ Graham Gold named "The Key the Secret" one of his favourites in 1995, saying, "I don't care who dissed it – or if it crossed over into the charts. The vocal was so up and positive it made me feel how music should make you feel – good." In his weekly UK chart commentary, James Masterton viewed it as "a rather weak-kneed piece of girlie dance". David Bennun from Melody Maker complimented it as a "mellifluous delight". Andy Beevers from Music Week rated it three out of five, describing it as a "poppy house tune with catchy female vocals".

Upon the release of the 1996 remix, a reviewer of the magazine gave it a score of four out of five, commenting, "A seemingly superfluous reissue remix of the 1993 number two hit. Nevertheless, the song maintains its effervescent hook of housey piano and celebratory vocal, and could well be a hit again." James Hamilton from the Record Mirror Dance Update declared it as a "Charlemagne cooed raving galloper" in his weekly dance column. Mark Frith from Smash Hits complimented it as a "corking" single in his review of the High on a Happy Vibe album. In 2012, Australian music channel Max included "The Key the Secret" in their list of "1000 Greatest Songs of All Time".

== Chart performance ==
In Europe, "The Key the Secret" peaked at number one in the Netherlands for a week. It entered the top 10 in Austria, Belgium, Germany, Ireland, Switzerland, and the United Kingdom, as well as on the Eurochart Hot 100 and European Dance Radio Chart. On the Eurochart Hot 100, "The Key the Secret" debuted at number 100 on 24 July, after charting in the UK. It peaked at number 10 six weeks later. In the UK, "The Key the Secret" peaked at number two during its sixth week on the UK Singles Chart; it spent two weeks as number two and 16 consecutive weeks inside the UK top 75. The song also peaked at numbers one and 11 on Music Week's Dance Singles and Airplay charts, respectively, as well as number five on the Record Mirror Club Chart. Additionally, it was a top-20 hit in Finland, Italy, and Spain while peaking within the top 30 in Sweden.

Outside Europe, the single reached number three on Canada's RPM Dance chart, number four in Australia, number six in Israel, number 10 in Zimbabwe, number 26 on the US Billboard Hot Dance Club Play chart, and number 31 in New Zealand. In 1996, the track was remixed and again entered the UK Singles Chart, peaking at number 52. It was remixed again in 2004, this time peaking at number 31.

== Music video ==
The accompanying music video of "The Key the Secret" was directed by British director and assistant director Lindy Heymann. It features the band performing the song in what appears to be an indoor botanical garden. Singer Diane Charlemagne sings between the plants. Several dancers also appear in the video, with body painting in gold. The colours of the video repeatedly fade out into black-and-white or the opposite. Some scenes also show the dancers looking into or they are seen through a glass sphere. "The Key the Secret" received heavy rotation on MTV Europe in November 1993.

== Track listing ==
"We picked up the remix of this single which we thought had enormous crossover potential. The Key: The Secret was a great success initially in the clubs and when a chart position followed, the popularity spread to younger record buyers. We ended up with a very wide spectrum of record buyers from very young kids to people in their late '20s and this is now being reflected in Europe. (...) Because the first single is very much a one liner, there was a lot of resistance from radio at first. We had to get a Top 40 position to get airplay. We only made a video for the single when we achieved a Top 20 position-we turned it over in five days and got a terrific reaction from TV, which made the single shoot up the charts."

— Pulse-8 MD Frank Sansom talking to Music & Media about the song.
- 7-inch single, Belgium (1993)
1. "The Key the Secret" (Glamourously Developed Edit) – 3:41
2. "The Key the Secret" (Kamoflage Club Edit) – 4:24
- 12-inch single, UK (1993)
1. "The Key the Secret" (Glamourously Developed Mix) – 6:16
2. "The Key the Secret" (Regressive Mix) – 6:01
3. "The Key the Secret" (Kamoflage Club Mix) – 6:40
4. "The Key the Secret" (Kamoflage Dub) – 7:30
- CD single, UK (1993)
1. "The Key the Secret" (Glamourously Developed Edit) – 3:40
2. "The Key the Secret" (Glamourously Developed Mix) – 6:16
3. "The Key the Secret" (Regressive Mix) – 6:01
4. "The Key the Secret" (Kamoflage Club Mix) – 6:40
5. "The Key the Secret" (Hungarian Deli Mix) – 5:16
6. "The Key the Secret" (Shute The Flute Mix) – 5:45
- CD single, Scandinavia (1993)
1. "The Key the Secret" (Glamourously Developed Edit) – 3:42
2. "The Key the Secret" (Glamorously Developed Mix) – 6:16

== Charts ==
=== Weekly charts ===
==== Original version ====
Chart (1993–1994)	Peak position
Australia (ARIA)	4
Austria (Ö3 Austria Top 40)	7
Belgium (Ultratop 50 Flanders)	5
Canada Dance/Urban (RPM)	3
Europe (Eurochart Hot 100)	10
Europe (European Dance Radio)	8
Europe (European Hit Radio)	24
Finland (IFPI)	11
Germany (GfK)	5
Ireland (IRMA)	4
Israel (Israeli Singles Chart)	6
Italy (Musica e dischi)	16
Netherlands (Dutch Top 40)	1
Netherlands (Single Top 100)	2
New Zealand (Recorded Music NZ)	31
Spain (AFYVE)	13
Sweden (Sverigetopplistan)	23
Switzerland (Schweizer Hitparade)	4
UK Singles (Official Charts)	2
UK Airplay (Music Week)	11
UK Dance (Music Week)	1
UK Club Chart (Music Week)	5
UK Indie (Music Week)	1
US Hot Dance Club Play (Billboard)	26
Zimbabwe (ZIMA)	10

Chart (1996)	Peak position
Scotland (OCC)	38
UK Singles (OCC)	52
UK Dance (OCC)	23
UK Pop Tip Club Chart (Music Week)	2

==== "The Key the Secret 2004" version ====
Chart (2004)	Peak position
Hungary (Dance Top 40)	40
UK Dance (OCC)	14

Chart (2005)	Peak position
Scotland (OCC)	29
UK Singles (OCC)	31
UK Dance (OCC)	40
UK Independent Singles (OCC)	41

Chart (2006)	Peak position
UK Independent Singles (OCC)	35

=== Year-end charts ===
Chart (1993)	Position
Australia (ARIA)	35
Belgium (Ultratop 50 Flanders)	36
Europe (Eurochart Hot 100)	46
Germany (Media Control)	46
Netherlands (Dutch Top 40)	15
Netherlands (Single Top 100)	33
Sweden (Topplistan)	76
UK Singles (OCC)	22

Chart (1994)	Position
Canada Dance/Urban (RPM)	42

== Certifications ==
Region	Certification	Certified units/sales
Australia (ARIA)	Platinum	70,000^{^}
Germany (BVMI)	Gold	250,000^{^}
United Kingdom (BPI)	Gold	400,000^{‡}
^{^} Shipments figures based on certification alone.^{‡} Sales+streaming figures based on certification alone.

== Release history ==
Region	Date	Format(s)	Label(s)	Ref.
United Kingdom	28 June 1993	7-inch vinyl; 12-inch vinyl; CD; cassette	Pulse 8	
Australia	2 August 1993	CD; cassette	Liberation	
Japan	21 January 1994	Mini-CD	Avex Trax	
Japan	22 June 1994	Mini-CD	Avex Trax	
