= Urban Cookie Collective =

British Eurodance band

- Origin: United Kingdom
- Genres: Eurodance
- Years active: 1987–present
- Members: Rohan Heath; Simon Bentall; Neil Claxton; Peter Samson; Johnny Jay; Lynsey Shaw; Mark Hadfield; Danielle Barnett
- Past members: Diane Charlemagne

Urban Cookie Collective are a British Eurodance group, best known for their 1993 hit single "The Key the Secret". The band was founded by keyboardist/songwriter Rohan Heath.

== History ==
The band was founded by Rohan Heath (born 19 July 1964, the son of Guyanese writer Roy Heath). He learned to play classical piano as a child before switching to the electric piano. He had previous experience with groups such as Yargo and Manchester DJ A Guy Called Gerald. Heath decided on a music career after abandoning a PhD at the University of Vermont. After a tour of Japan supporting the Happy Mondays, he left the band A Guy Called Gerald to work with the rave band Together. Heath went on to work with Jamaican reggae artist Eek-A-Mouse, before concentrating on his new project, Urban Cookie Collective. He was the keyboardist, writer, and producer of their music.

Heath wrote and produced both their hits: "The Key the Secret" and "Feels Like Heaven". He brought in vocalist Diane Charlemagne for many of the group's early tracks. She eventually co-wrote some of the songs and became a major part of the band.

The band caused some controversy in 1996 by recording a cover version of the Oasis song "Champagne Supernova". Noel Gallagher of Oasis, and the writer of the song, claimed that he had not given permission and legal action stopped the track from being given a full release.

In 2014, Charlemagne was diagnosed with kidney cancer. She died of the disease on 28 October 2015, aged 51. The band still remains active, and tours fronted by Lynsey Shaw.

Heath's current band, Kiiōtō, consists of him and Mercury Prize-nominated singer songwriter Lou Rhodes, also singer and co-founder of the band Lamb. Kiiōtō's first album came out on Nude Records in July 2024.

== Discography ==
=== Studio albums ===
Title	Album details	Peak chart positions									
Title	Album details	UK	AUS	AUT	EUR	FIN	GER	NED	SCO	SWE	SWI
High on a Happy Vibe	Released: 12 July 1993; Label: Pulse-8 (PULSE13); Formats: LP, CS, CD	28	34	31	60	19	43	55	33	50	28
Tales from the Magic Fountain	Released: 1 January 1995; Label: Pulse-8 (PULSE21); Formats: CS, CD	—	168	—	—	—	—	—	—	—	—
"—" denotes items that did not chart or were not released in that territory.

=== Compilation albums ===
Title	Album details
The Very Best of UCC	Released: 2000; Label: Eagle (EAG 307–2); Formats: CD
The Very Best Of	Released: 2004; Label: Amazon (AMAZCD2); Formats: CD, DVD
The Key, the Secret – The Very Best Of	Released: 2010; Label: Music Club Deluxe (MCDLX122); Formats: CD

=== Singles ===
Year	Title	Peak chart positions										Certifications	Album
Year	Title	UK	AUS	AUT	EUR	FIN	GER	NED	SCO	SWE	SWI	Certifications	Album
1992	"Pressin' On" (as Urban Cookie)	—	—	—	—	—	—	—	—	—	—		Non-album singles
1992	"Lucky Stars" (as Urban Cookie)	—	—	—	—	—	—	—	—	—	—		Non-album singles
1993	"The Key the Secret"	2	4	7	10	11	5	2	—	23	7	BPI: Silver; ARIA: Platinum; BVMI: Gold	High on a Happy Vibe
1993	"Feels Like Heaven"	5	10	11	17	13	12	12	—	17	9	ARIA: Gold	High on a Happy Vibe
1994	"Sail Away"	18	49	24	28	3	25	21	24	35	21		High on a Happy Vibe
1994	"High on a Happy Vibe"	31	71	—	89	8	—	37	18	—	49		High on a Happy Vibe
1994	"Bring It On Home (Family)"	56	125	—	—	—	—	—	47	—	—		High on a Happy Vibe
1995	"Spend the Day"	59	131	—	—	—	—	—	78	—	—		Tales from the Magic Fountain
1995	"Rest of My Love"	67	—	—	—	—	—	—	70	—	—		Tales from the Magic Fountain
1995	"So Beautiful"	68	—	—	—	—	—	—	72	—	—		Tales from the Magic Fountain
1996	"The Key the Secret" (remix)	52	—	—	—	—	—	—	38	—	—		Non-album single
1996	"Champagne Supernova"	—	—	—	—	—	—	—	—	—	—		The Very Best of UCC
1996	"Witness"	—	—	—	—	—	—	—	—	—	—		The Very Best of UCC
1997	"Ain't it a Shame"	—	—	—	—	—	—	—	—	—	—		Non-album singles
2000	"Mercedes Benz"	—	—	—	—	—	—	—	—	—	—		Non-album singles
2004	"The Key the Secret 2004"	—	—	—	—	—	—	—	—	—	—		Non-album singles
2005	"The Key the Secret 2005"	31	—	—	—	—	—	—	29	—	—		Non-album singles
"—" denotes items that did not chart or were not released in that territory.
