= Diane Charlemagne =

English singer-songwriter (1964–2015)

- Born: 22 February 1964; Manchester, England
- Died: 28 October 2015 (aged 51) London, U.K.
- Genres: Electronic; drum and bass; house; trance; trip hop
- Occupations: Singer; songwriter
- Years active: 1984−2015

Diane Charlemagne (22 February 1964 – 28 October 2015) was a British jazz, soul, funk and electronic dance music singer and songwriter.

== Biography ==
Charlemagne was lead singer with 1980s funk band 52nd Street, having replaced previous lead vocalist Beverley McDonald in 1984. In 1990, 52nd Street re-emerged as Cool Down Zone, with Charlemagne providing vocals as well as having writing credits on all 10 songs on their album New Direction. Later she was lead singer with Urban Cookie Collective, who had two UK top 10 hits in the 1990s.

Charlemagne provided the vocals for Goldie's "Inner City Life". Charlemagne was the primary vocalist for Goldie's Timeless album, and on Internal Affairs, a collaboration between Goldie and 4hero. She performed vocals for Moby for many of his live shows.

In 2006, Charlemagne collaborated with Scape on the house track and dance chart hit "Be My Friend" (as D Empress). 2007, she collaborated with High Contrast on his track "If We Ever" for the album Tough Guys Don't Dance. The following year, she worked with D:Ream, who had recently reformed, and in 2011, she collaborated with Aquasky on their dubstep track "Take Me There". In 2012, she collaborated with Netsky on his track "Wanna Die for You" for the album 2, and worked with S.P.Y on his drum and bass track "Hammer in My Heart" for the album What the Future Holds.

In 2014, she again collaborated with S.P.Y on the tracks "Dusty Fingers" and "Back to Basics" for the album Back to Basics Chapter One and then later on "Lost Orbit" and "Frozen" for the album Back to Basics Chapter Two. She also worked with London Elektricity and S.P.Y on the track "I Am Somebody" for the Street Child World Cup.

Towards the end of 2014, she started collaborating with London disco artists the Memory Notes. She sang on the single "Follow the Sun" and then later on "Say There's a Heaven".

In 2015, she provided the backing vocals for Ricky Valance's single "Welcome Home" in aid to raise money for various RAF charities.

== Death ==
After being diagnosed with kidney cancer the previous year, Charlemagne died of the disease on 28 October 2015, aged 51.

Goldie and Beverley Knight were among those to pay tribute to her.

== Discography ==
=== Albums ===
with 52nd Street

- Children of the Night (1986)
- Something's Going On (1987)

=== Singles and EPs ===
with 52nd Street

- "Can't Afford" (1984)
- "Tell Me How It Feels" (1985)
- "Last Chance" (1985)
- "I Can't Let You Go" (1986)
- "I'll Return" (1987)
- "Are You Receiving Me" (1988)
- "I Will Wait for You" (1988)
- "Superhuman" (2018)

with Cool Down Zone

- "Heaven Knows" (1990)

with Internal Affairs

- "Internal Affairs EP" (1993)

with Urban Cookie Collective

- "The Key the Secret" (1993)
- "Feels Like Heaven" (1993)
- "Sail Away" (1994)
- "High on a Happy Vibe" (1994)

with Goldie

- "Timeless"/"Inner City Life" (1995)

with Satoshi Tomiie

- "Come to Me" (1998)
- "Sincerity (Part 1&2)" (1999)
- "Inspired" (2000)

with Master & Hess (Mobin Master & Hess Barber)

- "Troubled Girl" (2003)

with Calibre

- "Bullets" (2005)

with Cyantific

- "Don't Follow" (2005)

with Scape

- "Be My Friend" (as D Empress) (2006)

with 2020 Soundsystem and Pat Fulgoni

- "Your Love" (2006)

with High Contrast

- "If We Ever" (2007)

with Blame

- "Keep The Sunshine" (2008)

with B-complex

- "Rolling with the Punches" (2010)

with S.P.Y

- "Hammer in my Heart" (2012)

with Netsky

- "Wanna Die for You" (2012) on 2

with Street Child World Cup feat. London Elektricity and S.P.Y

- "I Am Somebody" (2014)

with Taxman

- "Rebirth" (2014)

with the Memory Notes

- "Follow the Sun" (2014)
